= Rufat Safarov =

Azerbaijani human rights defender

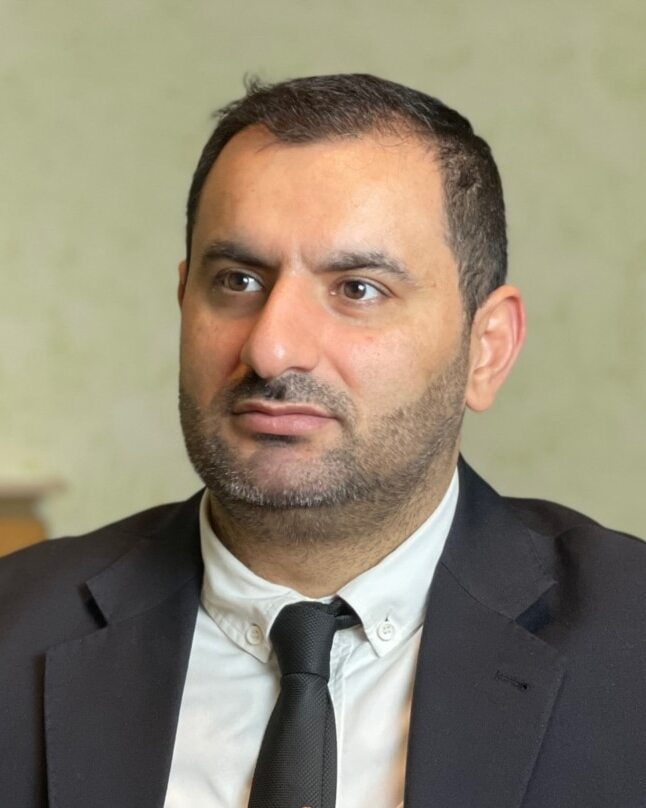
- Rufat Safarov in 2023
- Born: October 11, 1981 (age 44); Zahmat, Zangibasar District, Armenian Soviet Socialist Republic
- Citizenship: Azerbaijan
- Education: Faculty of Law at Baku State University
- Occupations: human rights defender, political prisoner
- Years active: 2020–present
- Organization: executive director of the "Defense Line" human-rights organization
- Father: Eldar Safarov
- Awards: U.S. State Department's Human Rights Award (2024)

Rufat Safarov (full name: Rufat Eldar oglu Safarov, Azerbaijani: Rüfət Eldar oğlu Səfərov, born October 11, 1981, Zahmat, Zangibasar District) is an Azerbaijani human rights defender, political prisoner and former investigator. Safarov worked as an investigator in the Zardab District Prosecutor's Office from 2011 to 2015.

On December 20, 2015, he publicly announced his resignation from his position, stating that he could no longer tolerate the "suppression of people's rights and freedoms." Shortly after this, under the instructions of Kamran Aliyev, head of the Main Directorate for Combating Corruption at the General Prosecutor's Office, a criminal case was initiated against him under Article 311.3.2 of the Criminal Code of Azerbaijan (accepting bribes). On January 15, he was arrested, and a week later, he was placed under house arrest. Even under house arrest, he continued making statements criticizing the government. On September 8, 2016, the Lankaran Court for Serious Crimes sentenced Rufat Safarov to 9 years in prison, and he was taken into custody in the courtroom. After 2 years and 6 months of imprisonment, he was released under a presidential amnesty decree issued on March 16, 2019. After his release, he resumed his work, initially as a public activist and then as a human rights defender.

In July 2020, he founded the human rights organization "Defense Line" (az. Müdafiə Xətti) and served as its executive director. Since then, he has continued his human rights work in Azerbaijan.

In December 2024, he was arrested again on charges under Articles 127.2.3 (intentional infliction of minor bodily harm), 221.1 (hooliganism), and 178.3.2 (fraud with large damage) of the Azerbaijani Criminal Code. This arrest was recognized by both local and international communities as politically motivated. According to Safarov, he was supposed to receive an award from United States Secretary of State Antony Blinken for his human rights work, and his arrest was aimed at preventing this from happening.

He is currently held in the Baku Pre-Trial Detention Center of the Penitentiary Service of the Ministry of Justice.

== Early years ==
Rufat Safarov was born on October 11, 1981, in the village of Zahmat, Zangibasar District, into the family of Eldar Sabiroglu. In early 1988, as a result of the deportation of Azerbaijanis from Armenia, he and his family were forced to leave the Zangibasar District.

From 1988 to 1998, he studied at secondary school No. 135 in the Binagadi District. He later graduated from the Faculty of Law at Baku State University.

Between 2004 and 2011, he worked as a lawyer at the Ministry of Agriculture of Azerbaijan, specializing in agricultural law. During this period, he was also a member of the supervisory board of the Open Joint Stock Company (OJSC) Agrolizing.

In 2011, after successfully passing a three-stage examination, he was accepted to work in the Prosecutor's Office. On October 1, 2011, he was appointed as an investigator for the Zardab District Prosecutor's Office. He holds a Class II legal qualification. In December 2015, he resigned from his position, which subsequently led to his arrest.

== Resignation, arrest, and trial (2015–2016) ==
Since 2011, Rufat Safarov held the position of an investigator at the Zardab District Prosecutor's Office. On December 20, 2015, he announced his resignation from this position and stated that he had sent a letter of resignation to the Prosecutor General, Zakir Garalov. He also made the letter public through the media. Later, Safarov shared on his social media accounts that he would fight against injustice. He mentioned that he resigned because he could not tolerate the "violation of people's rights and freedoms" and emphasized that his views "do not align with the position of the current regime."

On December 21, 2015, the General Prosecutor's Office announced that Rufat Safarov had been dismissed from the prosecutor's office for actions incompatible with the status of a prosecutor or investigator, grossly violating the requirements of Article 34 of the Law of the Republic of Azerbaijan "On Prosecutor’s Office" and Articles 30 and 31 of the Code of Ethical Conduct for Prosecutor's Office Employees of Azerbaijan.

The day after Safarov's resignation, on December 21, 2015, searches were conducted at his office and residence. As a result of these searches, his personal computer, mobile phones, and documents were seized. In protest of these actions, Safarov declared a hunger strike on December 21.

On January 15, 2016, Kamran Aliyev, head of the Main Directorate for Combating Corruption at the General Prosecutor's Office, announced at a press conference that various complaints had been received about Rufat Safarov, and a criminal case had been initiated against him under Article 311.3.2 of the Criminal Code of Azerbaijan (bribery). Commenting on the case, Safarov called the accusations biased and unfounded, adding that he was "not afraid of arrest, torture, or the harshest conditions."

== Preliminary investigation and trial ==
On January 15, by the decision of the Binagadi District Court, chaired by Judge Abbas Rzayev, a preventive measure in the form of arrest was imposed on Rufat Safarov for a period of 3 months and 26 days. According to his lawyer, Bahruz Bayramov, Safarov did not admit to the charges in court, calling them "absurd and ridiculous." On January 22, the Binagadi District Court replaced the arrest with house arrest.

On February 12, Rufat Safarov was summoned for questioning at the Anti-Corruption Directorate of the General Prosecutor's Office. Before the questioning, he told Voice of America: "I hadn’t been invited to the office for a month, despite being the accused, but today, I was invited right after I gave an interview to the Azadliq newspaper yesterday." On March 8, he published an article titled "The Murder of the Law" (az. Hüququn qətli) in Azadliq, where he sharply criticized the country's law enforcement agencies and government.

On May 4, the Binagadi District Court extended Safarov's house arrest for another 3 months. The preliminary investigation of the criminal case, which was led by Rashad Bashirov, an investigator from the Main Directorate for Combating Corruption at the General Prosecutor's Office, was completed on June 27, and the case was forwarded to the Lankaran Court for Serious Crimes for trial.

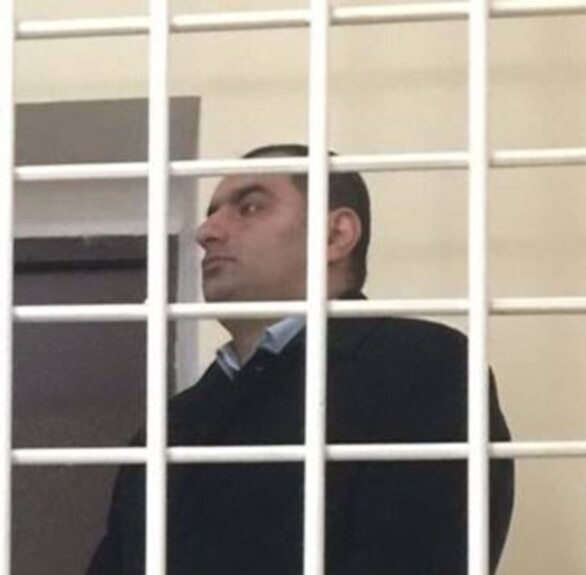
Safarov at the Baku Appeal Court (2017)

On July 25, a preparatory hearing took place at the Lankaran Court for Serious Crimes, chaired by Judge Asim Gadjiev, in the case of Rufat Safarov. Safarov himself denies the charges and considers the criminal case to be fabricated. He stated that the criminal case against him is fictitious and has no valid grounds. During the hearing, Safarov's lawyer, Bahruz Bayramov, filed a motion for the dismissal of the case on grounds of acquittal. However, the motion was not considered. Following this, the state prosecutor, Aydin Aliyev, requested that the criminal case be forwarded to court for trial. As a result, the court decided to transfer the case to trial.

On August 8, during the court hearing, state prosecutor Aydin Aliyev presented the indictment. According to the case materials, in 2014, Rufat Safarov allegedly received bribes from several individuals: 1000 manat from the chairman of the Əlibəyli rural municipality (a village in the Zardab District), Elchin Khalilov; 700 manat from Alamdar Abbasov, an employee of the district's electricity network; 500 manat from Mansur Panahov, an employee of the Zardab Veterinary Department; and 3000 manat from Eldaniz Abdullayev, the head of the culture and tourism department. Safarov rejected the charges, calling them defamation rather than an indictment. He believes the real reason for the criminal case against him is his public criticism of the prosecutor's office. He also noted that he had received personal gratitude from the Prosecutor General, Zakir Garalov, for his good work. "If I were a bribed official, why would they thank me?" Safarov pointed out.

On September 7, witnesses were questioned in court. Some witnesses did not confirm the testimony they had given during the preliminary investigation, while others stated they were unaware of the specific bribe that Safarov allegedly received. Despite these discrepancies, the state prosecutor made a statement and requested the court to sentence Safarov to 10 years of imprisonment.

On September 8, the final court hearing in the case of Rufat Safarov took place. The Lankaran Court for Serious Crimes handed down a sentence of 9 years in prison, and Safarov was arrested in the courtroom. In an interview, his lawyer, Bahruz Bayramov, called the verdict "shameful." "The court’s decision was made without allowing the defendant his final word. This will remain in Azerbaijan’s judicial history as the court that passed a verdict without the defendant’s last statement. It’s a huge disgrace," he remarked. Commenting on the decision to arrest him, Safarov said, "This is repression against me. They are simply trying to crush me under the wheels of the repressive machine."

According to the court's decision, Safarov was transferred to the Baku Investigative Detention Center in the Zabrat settlement. In October, Leyla Yunus, the head of the Institute for Peace and Democracy; Ogtay Gulaliyev, coordinator of the Public Alliance Azerbaijan Without Political Prisoners; and Elshan Gasanov, head of the Center for Monitoring Political Prisoners, considered Safarov's arrest to be politically motivated. They declared him a political prisoner and called for his immediate release.

In October, the Shirvan Appeal Court reviewed the appeal against Safarov's sentence. During the trial, chaired by Judge Alesger Novruzov, several motions submitted by Safarov's lawyer, Bahruz Bayramov, were not accepted. Safarov, in his speech, stated that this was an unjust court and that they were ultimately carrying out a political order. According to the final decision made on December 22, Rufat Safarov's appeal was rejected, and the 9-year prison sentence was upheld.

In July 2017, Rufat Safarov's cassation appeal was considered. Lawyers Bahruz Bayramov, Yalchin Imanov, and Fariz Namazli argued that Safarov was innocent, that the charges had not been proven during the investigation and trial, and that both the investigation and trials had been conducted in violation of the law. The lawyers requested the court to terminate the criminal case and acquit Rufat Safarov. During the trial, chaired by Judge Gulzar Rzayeva, the Supreme Court did not accept Safarov's appeal. In the hearing, Safarov declared, "The court will follow the instructions of Ilham Aliyev’s regime, regardless of its composition."

== Cruel treatment and torture in Correctional Facility No. 9 ==
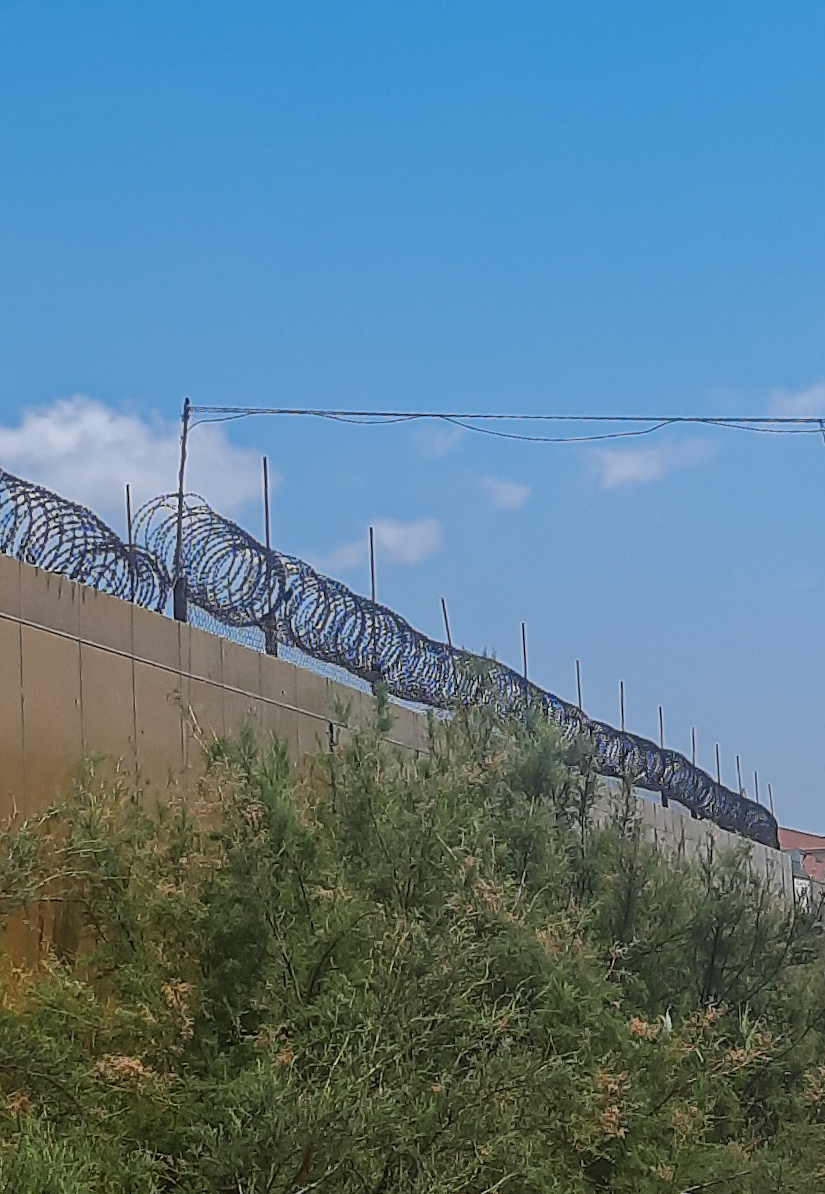
The walls of the Baku Pre-Trial Detention Center, where Rufat Safarov was held for 4 months in 2016–2017 and 11 months in 2024–2025. It is known in Azerbaijani society as "Kürdəxanı Prison", and numerous political prisoners have served their sentences here over the years.

On January 6, 2017, Rufat Safarov was transferred from the pre-trial detention center to correctional facility (colony) No. 9.

After the transfer, Rufat began to face pressure. According to his father, one of the facility's staff members took actions that humiliated Rufat. Despite his complaint about this, Rufat was found guilty of violating the internal rules of the institution and was reprimanded.

A week later, on January 17, Rufat was placed in a punishment cell for 7 days for disciplinary violations. According to his lawyer, Bahruz Bayramov, after Rufat's transfer to colony No. 9, a mentally ill person was placed next to him, who prevented Rufat from sleeping. When Rufat told the correctional facility guards about this, they insulted him. Afterward, Rufat filed a complaint with the head of the colony. As a result, Rufat was placed in the punishment cell for 7 days for violating discipline.

On March 7, his lawyer, Bahruz Bayramov, reported that Rufat Safarov had been placed in a punishment cell again for 3 days. According to the lawyer, placing Safarov in the punishment cell twice in two months under different pretexts is a mobilization of all administrative levers aimed at breaking his will and moral resistance. According to Bayramov, during a walk in the colony, a certain convict made serious and unfounded accusations against Safarov, such as calling him a "traitor to the people," a "traitor to the homeland," and someone who "does not have the right to live." Safarov filed a complaint about this to the head of the colony. As a result, the head of the colony considered both parties to be "sides in the dispute" and sentenced the man to 5 days in the punishment cell and Safarov to 3 days. Bayramov also stated that Safarov had asked for medication, but the guards refused to give him any because the "medicine limit" had been exhausted. Safarov's mother, Tahira Safarova, declared a hunger strike in protest of the pressure being exerted on her son.

The Committee for the Protection of Rufat Safarov's Rights believes that Azerbaijani society, international organizations, embassies, and diplomatic missions of foreign countries in our country should not remain indifferent to the moral terror being inflicted upon Rufat Safarov, and should take serious and effective steps to prevent provocations against him.

On September 21, Rufat Safarov declared a hunger strike in protest against the lawlessness occurring in Correctional Facility No. 9, the inhumane treatment of prisoners, torture, unjustified placement in "punishment cells," the division of prisoners into privileged and non-privileged classes, and the transformation of the correctional facility into a corrupt closed joint-stock company. The following day, on September 22, his lawyer, Bakhruz Bayramov, attempted to meet with him, but the head of the colony refused to allow it. Bayramov then stated that he was concerned about Safarov's fate and that he might be subjected to torture. It was later reported that Safarov had been placed in a punishment cell for the third time, this time for 10 days. On October 4, after ten days of uncertainty, his family was able to meet with him, and they discovered that Safarov had been subjected to brutal torture. According to his father, Eldar Sabiroglu, who spoke to "Voice of America", "On September 22, after submitting a petition to the prison chief to start the hunger strike, a group of staff members, including the deputy head of the prison, Azer Gurbanzadeh, attacked him as he was going out to the yard, threw him to the ground, kicked him in the head, beat him with a baton, and shouted insults and obscenities." The Penitentiary Service, in turn, denied Eldar Sabiroglu's statements. Spokesperson Mehman Sadigov declared that "it is impossible to torture Rufat Safarov or any other person." Lawyer Bayramov filed a complaint with the prosecutor's office regarding the incident. As a result, the prosecutor's office conducted an investigation based on the appeal to the prosecutor's office of the Khazar district and decided not to initiate a criminal case.

By the order of the President of the Republic of Azerbaijan, Ilham Aliyev, dated March 16, 2019, No. 1049, the citizen of the Republic of Azerbaijan, Rufat Eldar oglu Safarov, born in 1981, who was sentenced by the Lankaran Court for Serious Crimes on September 8, 2016, was released from the remaining part of his sentence.

== Arrest (2019) ==
Rufat Safarov was detained by the police during a protest organized by the National Council of Democratic Forces on October 19, 2019, in Baku. By court decision, he was sentenced to 30 days of imprisonment. During his detention at the Center for Administrative Detention (İHOSM) in the Binagadi district, officers from the Main Directorate for Combating Organized Crime of the Ministry of Internal Affairs came to him and threatened to initiate a criminal case against him. He was released on November 18, 2019, after serving his sentence.

== Human Rights activism ==
After his release in March 2019, Rufat Safarov began engaging in public activities. He criticized the Azerbaijani authorities, their policies, and the activities of law enforcement agencies on social media.

On July 20, 2020, at the initiative of Rufat Safarov and a group of lawyers and public activists, a new human rights organization, "Line of Defense," was created. During the founding meeting, Rufat Safarov was elected as the executive director of the organization.

On October 5, 2021, Rufat Safarov was detained while monitoring a protest by the Azerbaijani Popular Front Party of the Specialized Medical Facility of the Penitentiary Service. He was released after several hours of detention at the 3rd Police Station of the Khazar District Police Department.

On December 23, 2022, he was detained by the police while monitoring a protest organized by a group of activists at Fountain Square, demanding the release of Bakhtiyar Hajiyev. After several hours in the police station, Safarov was released.

In 2024, he completed an internship in the United States through the International Visitor Leadership Program (IVLP).

== Arrest and trial (2024–2026) ==
Rufat Safarov was detained on December 3, 2024, around 5:00 pm by individuals in plain clothes while on his way home. According to Safarov's father, his son was arrested to prevent him from receiving a human rights award in the United States, which was scheduled to be presented by U.S. Secretary of State Antony Blinken. However, according to the Ministry of Internal Affairs' press service, Safarov was arrested following a dispute with an individual over a land transaction, and an investigation was underway. After his detention, Safarov was taken to the Binagadi District Police Department. He faced charges under Articles 221.1 (hooliganism) and 178.3.2 (fraud with significant damage) of the Azerbaijani Criminal Code.

Following a meeting with Safarov, his lawyer, Elchin Sadigov, stated that Rufat Safarov was scheduled to receive a human rights award from the U.S. Department of State. "He said that in two days, Antony Blinken was supposed to present him with the award. Upon learning this, the Azerbaijani authorities fabricated this case," the lawyer claimed. On December 4, another charge was added against Safarov under Article 127.2.3 (intentional infliction of minor harm to health under aggravating circumstances).

On December 4, at the Binagadi District Court, presided over by Judge Aytakin Ibrahimova, the decision was made to apply a measure of pretrial detention, setting the duration at 4 months. According to Safarov's lawyer, Elchin Sadigov, no evidence was presented to the court supporting the accusations against Safarov. "Only a request for pretrial detention was submitted. The defense's request for house arrest was rejected. Safarov stated in court that his arrest was an act of retaliation for his human rights activities. He also noted that he expected the same fate as Elmar Huseynov (journalist Elmar Huseynov was murdered in March 2005 in front of his home, and the perpetrators and masterminds have never been arrested), so he considers his arrest to be a lighter punishment," the lawyer added.

Rufat Safarov filed an appeal against the Binagadi District Court's decision of December 4, 2024. On December 11, during a hearing at the Baku Appeal Court, chaired by Judge Emin Mehdiyev, the appeal was rejected, and the measure of pretrial detention was upheld.

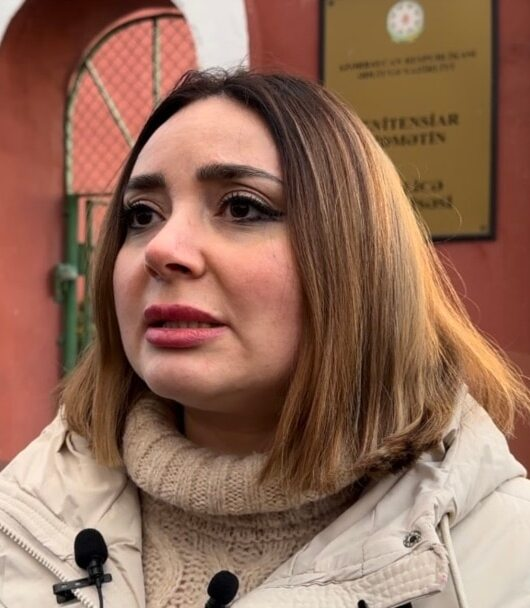
Rovshana Rahimova's lawyer stated that the charges against Rufat Safarov are unfounded

On February 25, 2025, a request was considered at the Binagadi District Court to transfer Safarov to house arrest. The petition was presented by Safarov's defense lawyers, Elchin Sadigov and Javad Javadov. "We justified the request by pointing out that Rufat Safarov has a permanent residence in Baku, known to the investigation. On the other hand, there are no grounds to suspect that Safarov might evade investigation. Furthermore, there is no evidence or material confirming that he committed the alleged crime," said lawyer Sadigov. According to him, Safarov also called the fraud charge against him false. "Rufat Safarov reminded that he resigned from the prosecutor’s office as a protest against the working methods in the system. The accusations of fraud are laughable," the lawyer continued. However, the court rejected the request.

On March 4, the Baku Appeal Court heard the appeal against the refusal to transfer Safarov to house arrest, submitted by his lawyers Javadov and Sadigov. "There is no reason to keep Rufat Safarov in custody. The evidence against him is unfounded, and even if the charges had any basis, there would still be no need for pretrial detention. He is a well-known public figure, with a permanent residence in Baku, and his release does not pose any threat to anyone. He does not consider himself guilty and intends to prove his innocence during the investigation, so he has no intention of evading it," said his lawyer Elchin Sadigov. The appeal court ignored the defense's arguments and left the appeal without satisfaction. The lawyer added that the defense would now approach the European Court of Human Rights (ECHR) to seek a potential recognition of Safarov's detention as unlawful.

On June 30, a session of the judicial panel in the criminal case of Rufat Safarov was held at the Baku Court for Grave Crimes. The session was chaired by Aygun Gurbanova, with Telman Guseynov and Farid Namazov as panel members. During the hearing, Safarov's personal data was clarified. His lawyer, Elchin Sadigov, requested that Safarov be allowed to sit next to him in the courtroom and that his detention be replaced with house arrest. The court granted the request to allow Safarov to sit next to his lawyer but rejected the request for house arrest.

The indictment was announced at the court hearing on July 14. According to the charges, Safarov took 60,000 manats (about 36,000 US dollars) from Natig Imamverdiyev, who was recognized as the victim, allegedly to sell him six sotkas (0.06 hectares) of land in the Novxanı settlement, a suburb of Baku, but "deceived him." Imamverdiyev supposedly demanded that Safarov either provide the property or return the money, and came to meet the accused for this purpose, where a conflict involving physical force took place. However, Safarov rejected the accusations in court, according to the defendant's lawyer, Elchin Sadygov. Safarov stated that he was being persecuted for defending citizens whose rights were violated for political and other reasons. "Rufat Safarov said that as a result, he himself became one of the 400 political prisoners in the country. He recalled that over the past nine years he had been arrested three times and subjected to harassment by government supporters," the lawyer noted. As for the substance of the charges, Sadygov said that the defendant claimed he had never met the victim before the incident and had only spoken to him over the phone. "Safarov pointed out that aside from Imamverdiyev’s testimony, there is no evidence of any transfer of 60,000 manats to my client. Safarov said that Imamverdiyev had repeatedly called him earlier, insisting that the human rights activist sell him his father’s plot of land. Safarov emphasized that Imamverdiyev had been ‘specifically instructed’ to create grounds for a dispute," the lawyer said. According to the defense, about 25 years ago, Safarov's father bought a plot of land in Novkhany with an area of 11 sotkas, and in 2024, due to financial difficulties, the human rights activist's parents decided to sell part of the land. Imamverdiyev purchased this portion under a notarized contract. However, some time later, Imamverdiyev began demanding that the entire plot be sold to him. "According to Safarov, Imamverdiyev was informed that the parents of the human rights activist did not intend to sell the remaining part of the plot. Safarov believes that Imamverdiyev insisted on the meeting in order to fabricate evidence against him," the lawyer said.

On 12 June 2026, Safarov was sentenced to eight years in prison on charges of fraud, hooliganism and intentional infliction of bodily harm.

== International attention ==
The arrest of Rufat Safarov has provoked mixed reactions both inside the country and beyond its borders, drawing sharp criticism. Immediately after his detention, United States Department of State Deputy Press Secretary Vedant Patel, responding to questions from the Turan News Agency, stated that they were deeply concerned by reports about the arrest of human rights defender Rufat Safarov in Azerbaijan. On December 6, during a meeting of the OSCE Council of Foreign Ministers in Malta, U.S. Secretary of State Antony Blinken met with civil society representatives from Azerbaijan, Belarus, Kyrgyzstan, Russia, and Ukraine. During the meeting, human rights activist Emin Huseynov raised the issue of worsening human rights conditions in Azerbaijan, including the recent arrest of human rights defender Rufat Safarov. The Chairman of the U.S. Senate Foreign Relations Committee, Senator Ben Cardin from Maryland, also called on the government of Azerbaijan to immediately release Rufat Safarov.

Amnesty International described the arrest of Rufat Safarov on fabricated charges of "fraud" and "hooliganism" as another striking example of the Azerbaijani authorities' relentless efforts to suppress dissent in the country and called for his immediate release.

The European Union (EU) Ambassador to Azerbaijan, Peter Michalko, reminded that Safarov's arrest, on the eve of an event dedicated to Human Rights Day, occurred under the same circumstances as the arrest of Bakhtiyar Hajiyev two years ago. The British Ambassador to Azerbaijan, Fergus Auld, expressed deep concern over the arrest of Safarov.

Opposition leaders in Azerbaijan also characterized Safarov's arrest as politically motivated and stated that he is a political prisoner. The Chairman of the Azerbaijan Popular Front Party (APFP), Ali Karimli, called Rufat Safarov the country's most courageous and active human rights defender, reminding that Safarov had previously voluntarily left his position in the prosecutor's office and had endured a period of life as a political prisoner. Isa Gambar, the Chairman of the Musavat Party, condemned Safarov's arrest, emphasizing that he is one of the most dedicated and active figures in defending human rights in Azerbaijan and that his arrest has a political background. Natig Jafarli, Chairman of the Political Committee of the Republican Alternative Party (REAL), stated that the detention and arrest of citizens for their political and public activities in Azerbaijan are unacceptable. The Head of the Political Management Institute, Azer Gasimli, noted that only a few human rights defenders remain free in the country, and that Rufat Safarov stands out among them for his courage and commitment to the cause. The Chairman of the National Council of Democratic Forces, professor Jamil Hasanli, expressed the opinion that Safarov's arrest was the result of a pre-planned operation, emphasizing that in recent years, Safarov had persistently and honestly worked to defend the rights of political prisoners.

=== Reaction of the U.S. State Department and the European Parliament ===
On December 11, 2024, United States Secretary of State Antony Blinken issued a special statement regarding the arrests of activists and journalists in Azerbaijan and called on the country's authorities to release them. Baku accused Blinken of bias and rejected the claims of suppressing civil liberties. In his statement titled "Escalation of Repression Against Civil Society and Media in Azerbaijan," Blinken specifically mentioned Rufat Safarov, Sevinj Vagifgizi, Azer Gasimli, Farid Mehralizade, Bakhtiyar Hajiyev, recently detained Meydan TV staff, and many others arrested for their human rights work. The U.S. called on the Azerbaijani government to release them immediately, Blinken stated. "The United States is deeply concerned not only about these detentions but also about the increasing repression of civil society and media in Azerbaijan," the United States Department of State's statement emphasized. The Azerbaijani Ministry of Foreign Affairs responded negatively to Blinken's statement, accusing the U.S. State Department of interfering in the country's internal affairs. According to the ministry, such interference has continued "for the past four years," which has been "lost years for Azerbaijani-American relations."

On December 19, 2024, the European Parliament sharply criticized the recent arrests in Azerbaijan. Members of the European Parliament focused their attention on the fact that, in early December, the Azerbaijani authorities arrested employees of Meydan TV, including Aynur Ganbarova, Aytaj Ahmadova, Khayala Aghayeva, Natig Javadli, and Aysel Umudova, journalists Ramin Jabrailzadeh and Ahmed Mukhtar, as well as the deputy director of the Baku School of Journalism Ulvi Tahirov, political activist Azer Gasimli, and human rights defender Rufat Safarov, all of whom were charged with unfounded, politically motivated accusations. Ultimately, the European Parliament adopted a resolution condemning the arrests. On December 20, the Milli Majlis (National Assembly) of Azerbaijan described the European Parliament's resolution on human rights in the country as "biased" and "anti-Azerbaijani."

== Awards ==
In 2024, Rufat Safarov was awarded the U.S. State Department's Human Rights Award for his work in the field of human rights protection.
