= Criminal case against Meydan TV =

Criminal case against Meydan TV officials

- Date: June 30, 2015 – May 6, 2019
- Venue: Azerbaijan
- Cause: • Illegal entrepreneurship and tax evasion (official version) • Suppression of independent and critical media in Azerbaijan (presumed version)
- Outcome: Meydan TV’s Baku office was closed; its journalists were unlawfully prohibited from crossing the border until May 2019

The criminal case against Meydan TV, officially designated as Criminal Case No. 152006048, is a criminal investigation that has been conducted since 2015 by the Investigation Department for Serious Crimes of the Prosecutor General’s Office against officials of Meydan TV under Articles 192.2.2, 213.2.2 and 308.2 of the Criminal Code. These articles provide for liability for illegal entrepreneurship, tax evasion and abuse of official authority.

The criminal case involved the names of Meydan TV director Emin Abdullayev (Milli), editor-in-chief Aynur Ganbarova (Elgunesh), editor Gunel Imanova (Movlud), journalists Aytan Farhadova, Izolda Aghayeva, Natig Javadli and Orkhan Mammadov; video reporters Aynura Heydarova, Aytaj Ahmadova (Tapdig), Javid Abdullayev, Sevinj Abbasova (Vagifgizi) and Shirin Abbasov (Tire); photographer Elnur Mukhtarov; video reporter intern Salima Jalilova; journalist Guler Mehdizade, whose articles were published by Meydan TV; and writer Rasim Nasirov (Garaja). All of them, with the exception of Emin Milli, who was residing in Germany, were subjected to travel restrictions prohibiting them from leaving the country. The ban remained in force until May 2019.

Subsequently, between 2018 and 2024, the European Court of Human Rights (ECHR) issued five separate judgments finding violations of the right to freedom of movement of 11 individuals (Article 2 of Protocol No. 4 to the Convention) and the right to an effective remedy (Article 13 of the Convention). The Azerbaijani government was ordered to pay a total of €62,000 in compensation.

During the preliminary investigation into the criminal case, dozens of people who had cooperated with Meydan TV were questioned as witnesses by the Investigation Department for Serious Crimes. In the following weeks of the criminal prosecution, law enforcement agencies also became involved in the preliminary investigation. Searches were conducted at the homes of some of these individuals. Young female journalists — 22-year-old Aytaj Ahmadova, 21-year-old Salima Jalilova and 20-year-old Shirin Abbasov — were abducted directly from the street and taken to the Main Department for Combating Organized Crime of the Ministry of Internal Affairs, where they were interrogated and made to give statements. Shirin Tire was detained by this department for one month. On the basis of statements obtained from Shirin Tire under torture at the department, several individuals were subsequently summoned again for questioning by the Investigation Department for Serious Crimes.

Even before the criminal case was opened, Ramiz Mehdiyev, head of the Presidential Administration, described Meydan TV as a “fifth column” and accused it of attempting to “violently overthrow the constitutional order”. Following this, Meydan TV was forced to cease the operation of its Baku office.

During the criminal prosecution, which was based on politically motivated accusations, the brother-in-law of Emin Milli, who was residing in Azerbaijan while Milli himself was abroad, was arrested. The brothers of Meydan TV editor Gunel Movlud, who were also living in Azerbaijan, were arrested as well. Both Emin Milli’s and Gunel Movlud’s family members were forced to disown them.

Although no official information is available, it is believed that proceedings in the criminal case were suspended in 2019.

== Background ==
Meydan TV was founded on 10 March 2013 by human rights activist Emin Abdullayev (Milli), blogger Habib Abdullayev (Muntazir) and rapper Jamal Aliyev (Ali). The channel first went on air via satellite broadcasting on 15 May 2013. However, from that point onwards, measures were taken in Azerbaijan to interfere with Meydan TV’s broadcasts and block them. The channel’s objective was to create a free media platform in Azerbaijan. Meydan TV is considered one of the most independent media outlets in the country.

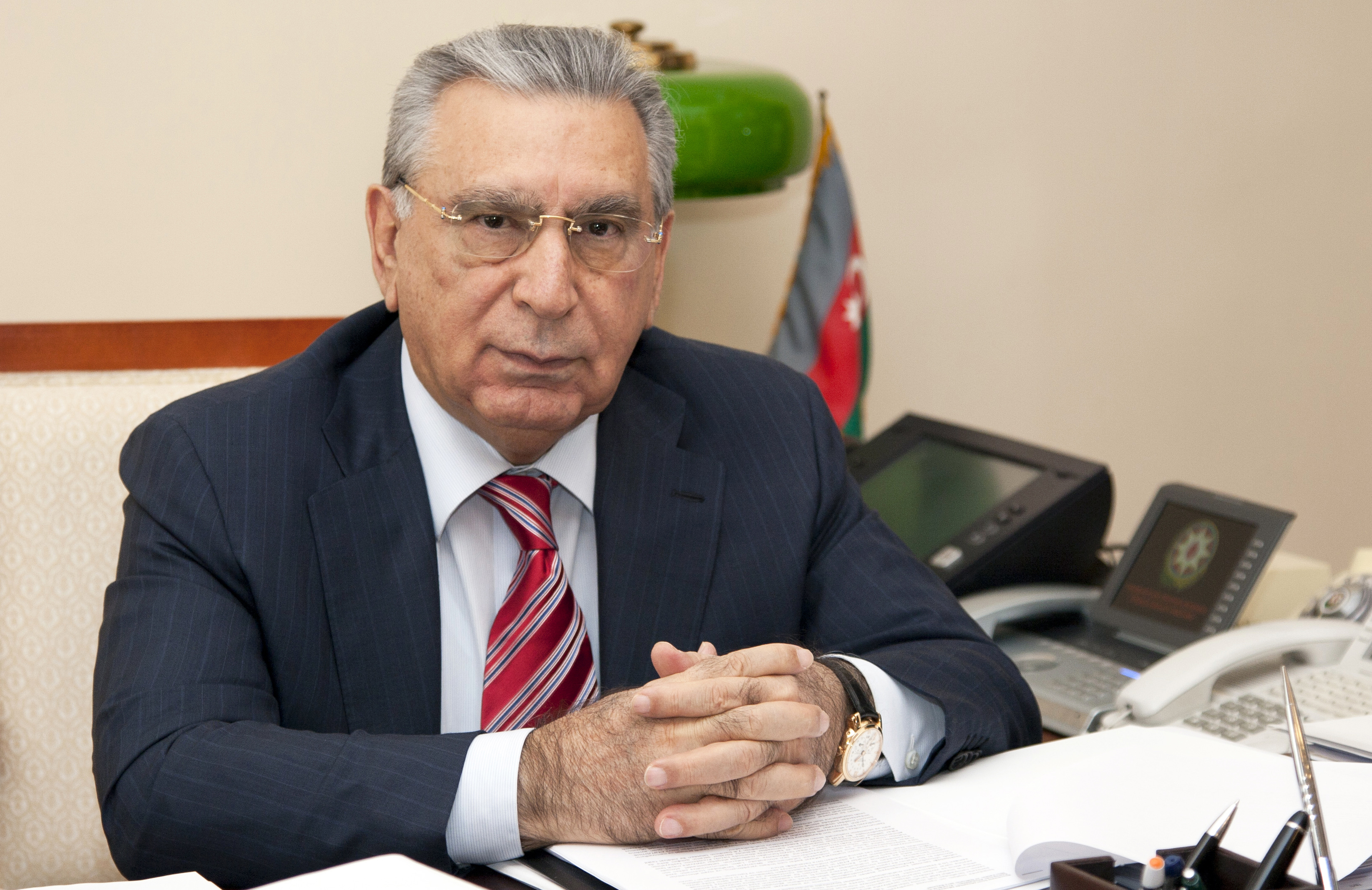
Ramiz Mehdiyev

On 3 December 2014, an article by Ramiz Mehdiyev, head of the Presidential Administration, entitled “The World Order of Double Standards and Modern Azerbaijan” was published on the website of the Azerbaijan State News Agency (AZƏRTAC). In the article, Ramiz Mehdiyev claimed that “grants received by certain NGOs are not directed towards the development of civil society institutions, but rather towards attempts to violently change the constitutional order in the country”. He also stated that “foreign donors, by financing certain organisations, compel them to grossly violate Azerbaijani legislation and undermine stability in the country”. As an example, he cited the fact that “the European Endowment for Democracy allocated a grant of approximately $300,000 to the Meydan TV project, whose sole purpose is to tarnish the image of the Azerbaijani state and undermine Azerbaijan’s authority”. According to him, such activities not only demonstrated political hypocrisy but also undermined the very idea of civil society.

On 9 December 2014, Meydan TV director Emin Milli announced that the channel’s Baku office would cease operations due to the suppression of freedom of speech and expression in Azerbaijan and pressure on independent media. Emin Milli stated that Ramiz Mehdiyev’s accusations that Meydan TV was attempting to “violently overthrow the constitutional order” would have very serious consequences for everyone involved, including Mehdiyev himself. He also added that the decision to close the office had been made primarily for the safety of employees and to protect their lives.

== Timeline of the Criminal Prosecution ==
=== June 2015: Travel Bans ===
On 30 June 2015, Meydan TV journalists Aytan Farhadova, Shirin Abbasov (Tire), Elnur Mukhtarov and Natig Javadli attempted to cross the state border at the Böyük Kəsik border checkpoint in the Aghstafa District in order to travel to Tbilisi, Georgia. They were informed that they had officially been prohibited from leaving the country and that restrictions had been imposed on their crossing of the state border.

In an interview with Radio Free Europe/Radio Liberty, Meydan TV director Emin Milli stated that, under the law, a person could only be subjected to a travel ban if they had been formally involved in criminal proceedings as a suspect or an accused person. “We have received neither official nor unofficial information about any inspections or investigations concerning Meydan TV, or about the opening of a criminal case. Therefore, the travel ban imposed on journalists who provide Meydan TV with materials or articles came as a surprise to us. By preventing Meydan TV journalists from crossing the border, the Azerbaijani government has once again demonstrated its weakness,” he said.

On 1 July, Natig Javadli submitted an inquiry to Minister of Internal Affairs Ramil Usubov regarding the travel restrictions imposed on him. Javadli received a response two weeks later. In the reply, Arziman Aliyev, Head of the Main Department of Passport, Registration and Migration Services of the Ministry of Internal Affairs, stated: “The Ministry of Internal Affairs has not imposed any restrictions on your departure from the country. In connection with your return from the border, we recommend that you contact the State Border Service.”

== July 2015: Arrest of a Relative of Emin Milli ==
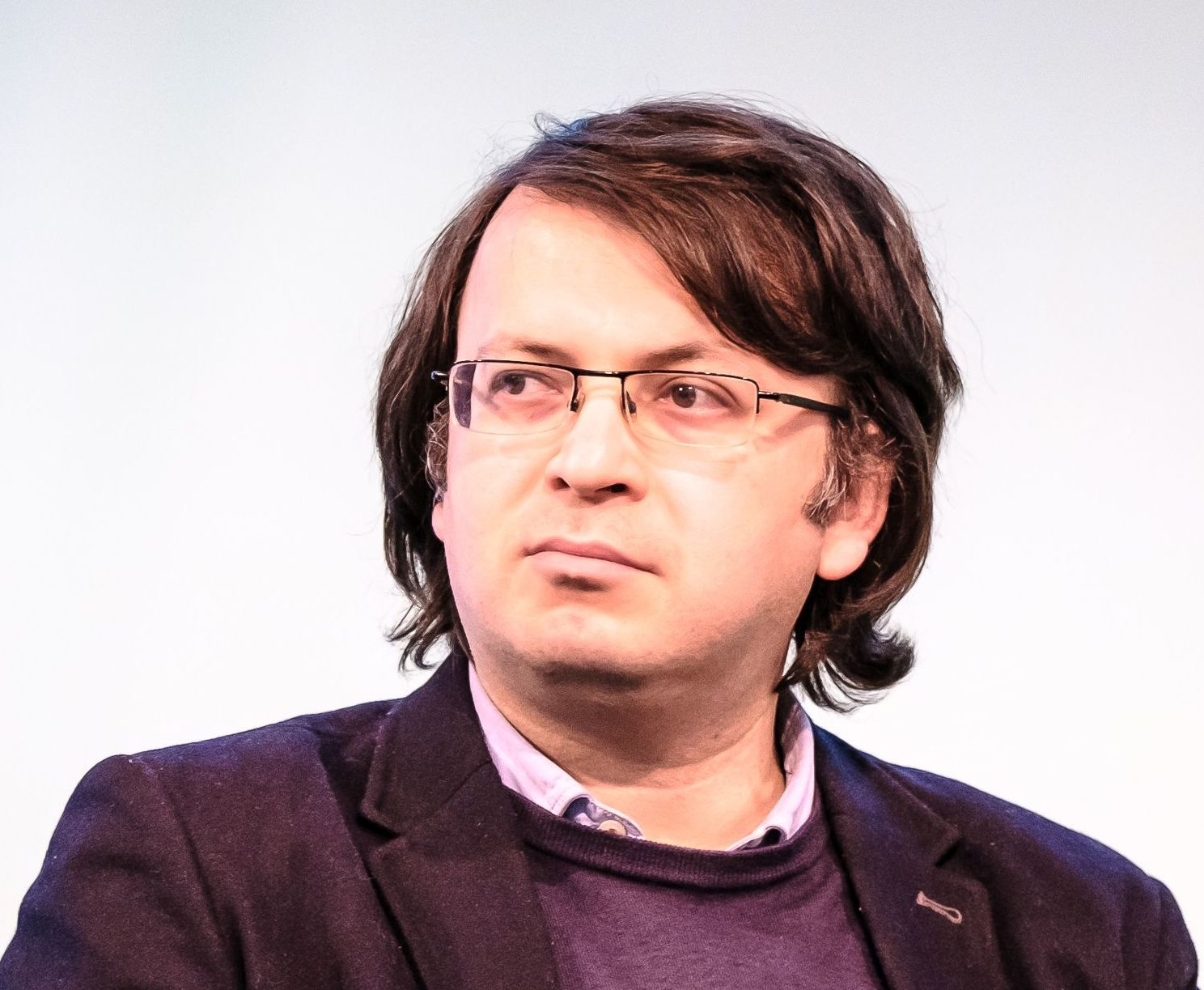
Emin Milli

On 23 July 2015, Nazim Aghabeyov, the brother of Emin Milli’s wife, was arrested. According to Emin Milli, Nazim Aghabeyov, who worked as an IT specialist, was charged under Article 234.4.3 of the Criminal Code. This provision establishes criminal liability for the sale of narcotic drugs in large quantities. According to Aghabeyov's family members, he was accused of allegedly selling heroin and forcibly taken from his workplace to the Main Department for Combating Drug Trafficking of the Ministry of Internal Affairs. Emin Milli described the accusation as “absurd” and emphasised that such actions were a “widespread practice under Ilham Aliyev”. He also stated: “Ilham Aliyev punishes relatives living in Azerbaijan of political activists who are abroad, effectively taking them hostage.” By a decision of Ibrahim Ibrahimli, a judge of the Khatai District Court, Nazim Aghabeyov was remanded in custody for four months.

On 19 April 2016, Mayis Aghabeyov, Emin Milli’s father-in-law and the father of the arrested Nazim Aghabeyov, addressed Azerbaijani President Ilham Aliyev with a statement claiming that “Emin Milli is conducting propaganda against the Azerbaijani state”. In his appeal to the head of state, Aghabeyov emphasised that his son had been arrested solely because of Emin Milli and asked that his son not be punished for Milli’s “unworthy” actions. Three days later, on 22 April 2016, at a hearing of the Baku Court for Serious Crimes presided over by Judge Afgan Hajiyev, Nazim Aghabeyov was sentenced to three years of imprisonment, suspended for a probationary period of two years, and released from custody.

== Individuals Mentioned in the Criminal Prosecution ==
Repressive measures taken against individuals named in Criminal Case No. 152006048.
#	Name	Year of birth	Position	Repressive measures
1	Aynur Ganbarova	1974	Editor-in-chief	Questioned by the Investigation Department; travel restrictions imposed
2	Aynura Heydarova	1981	Video reporter	Travel restrictions imposed
3	Aytaj Ahmadova	1993	Video reporter	Questioned; travel restrictions imposed; abducted by MDCOC officers
4	Aytan Farhadova	1980	Journalist	Questioned by the Investigation Department; travel restrictions imposed
5	Javid Abdullayev	1992	Video reporter	Questioned by the Investigation Department; travel restrictions imposed
6	Elnur Mukhtarov	1989	Photographer	Travel restrictions imposed
7	Guler Mehdizade	1988	Journalist	Travel restrictions imposed
8	Izolda Aghayeva	1988	Video reporter	Questioned by the Investigation Department; travel restrictions imposed
9	Natig Javadli	1971	Journalist	Questioned by the Investigation Department; travel restrictions imposed
10	Orkhan Mammadov		Journalist	Travel restrictions imposed
11	Rasim Nasirov	1960	Writer	Travel restrictions imposed
12	Sevinj Abbasova	1989	Video reporter	Questioned by the Investigation Department; travel restrictions imposed
13	Salima Jalilova	1994	Video reporter	Travel restrictions imposed
14	Shirin Abbasov	1995	Video reporter	Questioned; travel restrictions imposed; arrested by MDCOC officers
15	Tural Asadov	1993	???	Travel restrictions imposed

== Legal Proceedings ==
On 14 January 2016, Aytaj Ahmadova’s lawyer, Zibeyda Sadigova, submitted a complaint to Prosecutor General Zakir Garalov, a first-class state justice counsellor. The complaint reported the detention of Aytaj Ahmadova by officers of the Main Department for Combating Organised Crime (MDCOC) of the Ministry of Internal Affairs, the unlawful search of her apartment and confiscation of her computer, as well as the torture and inhuman and degrading treatment to which she had allegedly been subjected while at the MDCOC. The lawyer requested that criminal proceedings be initiated against the MDCOC officers who had detained Aytaj Ahmadova and subjected her to inhuman treatment at the department. On 16 March 2016, Rustam Usubov, first deputy prosecutor general, issued a decision refusing to initiate criminal proceedings. According to Zibeyda Sadigova, since the decision was unlawful and unfounded, it would be challenged in court.

As part of the preliminary investigation into Criminal Case No. 152006048, Eldar Ahmadov, head of the Investigation Department for Serious Crimes of the Prosecutor General’s Office and a third-class justice counsellor, imposed restrictions on 15 individuals from crossing the state border, acting on a motion submitted by Ali Babayev, head of the investigative team. Independent lawyers considered the restrictions imposed on these individuals unlawful, linked them to their journalistic activities and stated that the restrictions had been applied solely as a form of punishment.

Beginning in April 2016, the Nasimi District Court of Baku examined complaints submitted by individuals who had been subjected to travel bans:

- Aynur Ganbarova (Judge Babek Panahov);
- Guler Mehdizade;
- Izolda Agрayeva (Judge Babek Panahov);
- Aytaj Ahmadova (Judge Elman Isayev);
- Sevinj Abbasova (Judge Shalala Hasanova);
- Natig Javadli (Judge Elman Isayev);
- Aytan Farhadova.

The local courts, including both first-instance and appellate courts, rejected all the complaints submitted. In most cases, the courts refused even to accept the complaints for consideration, citing the fact that “a preliminary investigation is being conducted in connection with the criminal case”.

According to many lawyers, the restrictions imposed on individuals as part of the preliminary investigation into the criminal case were entirely unlawful. Restrictions on citizens’ right to leave the country may only be imposed in accordance with the procedure established by the Migration Code and only where the following grounds exist: the individual has the status of a suspect or accused person, or has been convicted, including receiving a suspended sentence.

As a result, 11 individuals lodged applications with the European Court of Human Rights (ECHR). The applicants relied on Article 2 of Protocol No. 4 to the European Convention on Human Rights (freedom of movement), as well as Article 6 of the Convention (right to a fair trial). They argued that the national judicial system had violated their right of access to a court by refusing to examine their complaints on their merits. The applicants also alleged violations of Article 10 of the Convention (freedom of expression) and Article 18 of the Convention (limitation on the use of restrictions on rights).

Between 2018 and 2024, the ECHR delivered five separate judgments finding violations of the right to freedom of movement of 11 individuals (Article 2 of Protocol No. 4 to the Convention) and the right to an effective remedy (Article 13 of the Convention). The Azerbaijani government was ordered to pay a total of €62,000 in compensation.

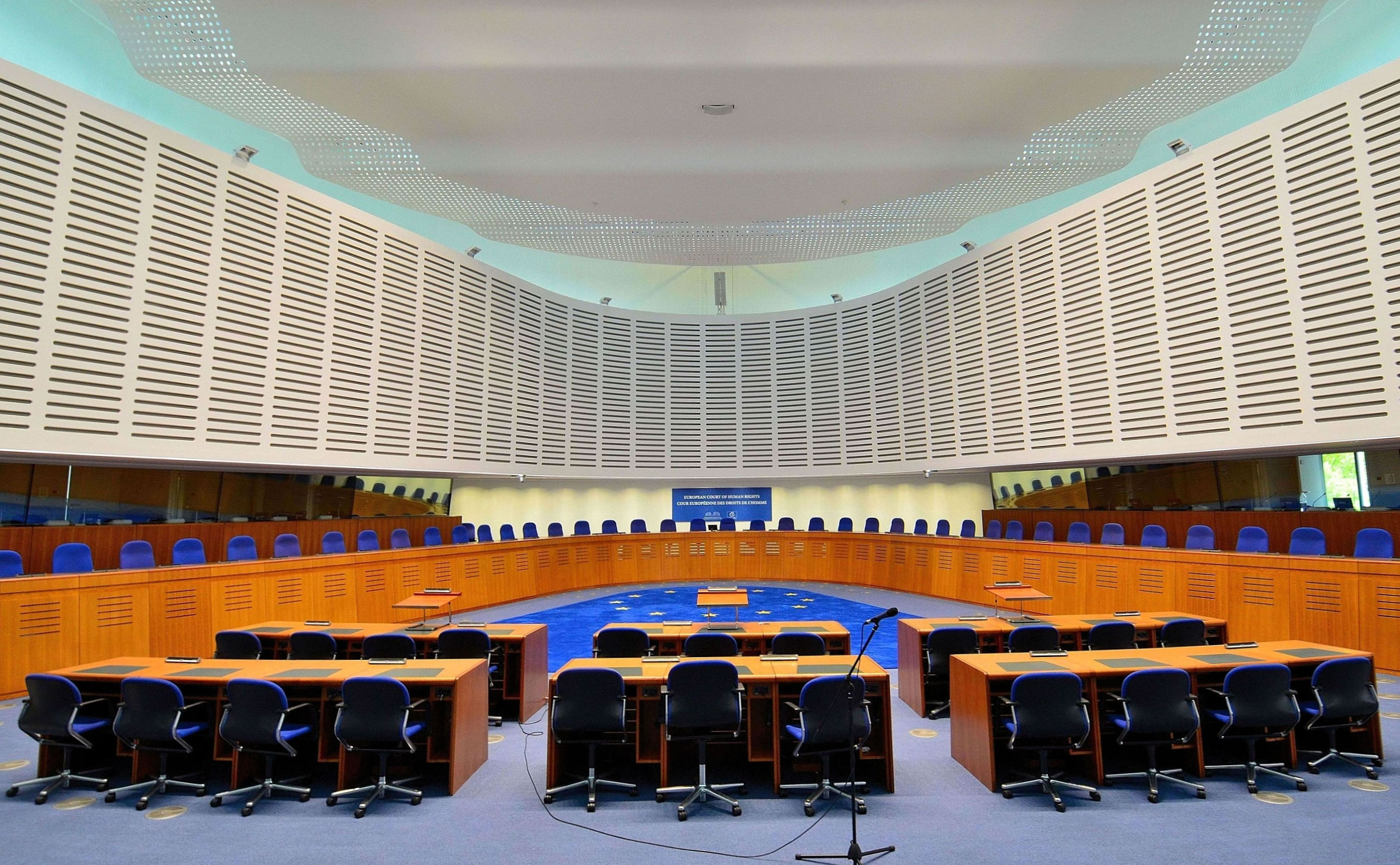
European Court of Human Rights (ECHR)

On 13 December 2018, the European Court of Human Rights delivered judgments in the cases:

- Guler Mehdizade v. Azerbaijan (Application No. 43327/16);
- Izolda Aghayeva v. Azerbaijan (Application No. 8051/17);
- Aynura Heydarova v. Azerbaijan (Application No. 8702/17);
- Aytan Farhadova v. Azerbaijan (Application No. 12870/17).

According to the ECHR judgments, the Azerbaijani government had violated the rights of Guler Mehdizade, Izolda Aghayeva, Aynura Heydarova and Aytan Farhadova to freedom of movement (Article 2 of Protocol No. 4 to the Convention) and to an effective remedy (Article 13 of the Convention). Under the Court’s decision, each applicant was awarded €5,000 in respect of non-pecuniary damage and an additional €500 for legal costs.

On 14 May 2020, the European Court of Human Rights delivered a judgment in the case of Sevinj Abbasova v. Azerbaijan (Application No. 6508/18). During the communication of the application, the Azerbaijani government acknowledged the alleged violations of the right to freedom of movement (Article 2 of Protocol No. 4 to the Convention) and the right to an effective remedy (Article 13 of the Convention), and offered to pay compensation to the applicant. Taking this into account, the Court decided to strike the application out of its list of cases. According to the ECHR decision, the government paid the applicant €5,000 in compensation for non-pecuniary damage.

On 24 September 2020, the European Court of Human Rights delivered judgments in the cases of Rasim Nasirov v. Azerbaijan (Application No. 53173/18) and Tural Asadov v. Azerbaijan (Application No. 72002/17). During the communication of the applications, the Azerbaijani government acknowledged the alleged violations of the right to freedom of movement (Article 2 of Protocol No. 4 to the Convention) and the right to an effective remedy (Article 13 of the Convention), and offered to pay compensation to the applicants. Taking this into account, the Court decided to strike the applications out of its list of cases. According to the ECHR decision, the government paid each applicant €5,000 in compensation for non-pecuniary damage and an additional €1,000 in legal costs.

On 21 September 2023, the European Court of Human Rights delivered a judgment in the case of Aynur Ganbarova and Others v. Azerbaijan (Application No. 1158/17). According to the judgment, the Azerbaijani government had violated the rights of Aynur Ganbarova, Aytaj Ahmadova and Natig Javadli to freedom of movement (Article 2 of Protocol No. 4 to the Convention) and to an effective remedy (Article 13 of the Convention). Under the Court’s decision, each applicant was awarded €5,000 in respect of non-pecuniary damage and an additional €1,000 in legal costs.

On 8 February 2024, the European Court of Human Rights delivered a judgment in the case of Salima Jalilova v. Azerbaijan (Application No. 1395/18). During the communication of the application, the Azerbaijani government acknowledged the alleged violations of the right to freedom of movement (Article 2 of Protocol No. 4 to the Convention) and the right to an effective remedy (Article 13 of the Convention), and offered to pay compensation to the applicant. Taking this into account, the Court decided to strike the application out of its list of cases. According to the ECHR decision, the government paid Salima Jalilova €5,000 in compensation for non-pecuniary damage.

On 11 March 2025, the European Court of Human Rights delivered a judgment in the case of Aytaj Ahmadova v. Azerbaijan (Application No. 30551/18). According to Ahmadova’s application, in September 2015 officers of the Main Department for Combating Organised Crime of the Ministry of Internal Affairs conducted an unlawful search of her apartment without any court order and confiscated her computer. Subsequently, some personal photographs stored on the computer, depicting her with family members at home and at the beach, were published on various Facebook accounts belonging to fake identities. Ahmadova argued that her right to a fair trial (Article 6 of the Convention) and her right to respect for private and family life (Article 8 of the Convention) had been violated. She also maintained that the local law enforcement authorities and judicial system had failed to investigate her complaints in this regard. According to the European Court of Human Rights judgment, the Azerbaijani authorities violated Aytaj Ahmadova’s right to respect for her private and family life. The Court awarded the applicant €4,500 in respect of non-pecuniary damage and an additional €1,000 in legal costs.

== See also ==
- Human rights in Azerbaijan
- Media freedom in Azerbaijan
