= Aynur Elgunesh =

Azerbaijani journalist

Aynur Gambarova
- Aynur Qəmbərova
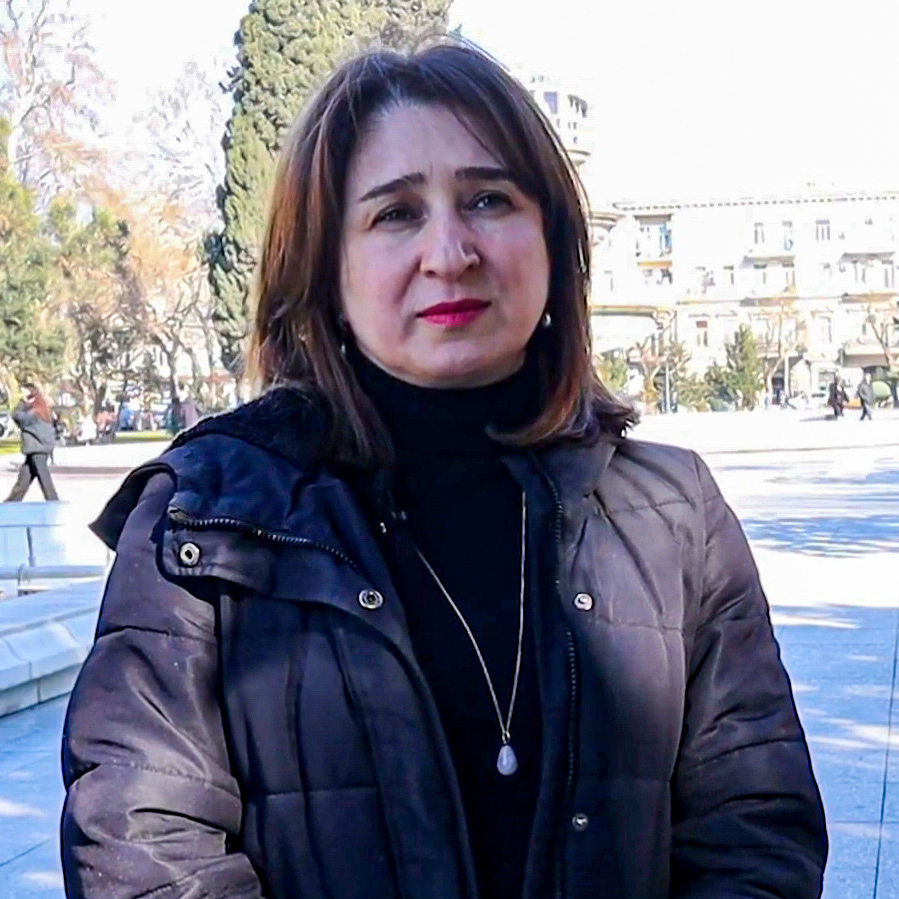
- Aynur Elgunesh in 2023
- Born: May 29, 1975 (age 51); Aghdam District, Azerbaijani SSR, Soviet Union
- Citizenship: Azerbaijan
- Education: Azerbaijan State Pedagogical University
- Occupations: journalist, political prisoner
- Years active: 1996–present
- Awards: Wallis Annenberg Justice for Women Journalists Award (2025)

Aynur Telman gizi Gambarova (Azerbaijani: Aynur Telman qızı Qəmbərova), known professionally as Aynur Elgunesh (born 29 May 1975) is an Azerbaijani journalist and political prisoner. From 2005 to 2014, she worked for the well-known newspapers Gündəlik Azərbaycan ("Daily Azerbaijan"), Yeni Müsavat ("New Musavat"), Azadlıq ("Freedom"), and Bizim Yol ("Our Path"). Since April 2014, she has been working at Meydan TV and currently serves as its editor-in-chief.

On December 6, 2024, she was arrested in connection with a criminal case filed against journalists from Meydan TV. On December 8, the Khatai District Court ordered her detention as a preventive measure. She and other detainees in the case were charged under Article 206.3.2 of the Azerbaijani Criminal Code (smuggling committed by a group of persons by prior conspiracy). Aynur Elgunesh denied the charges and attributed her detention to her professional journalistic activities.

Several local and international human rights organizations condemned the arrest of Aynur Elgunesh, calling it political and urged the Azerbaijani authorities to release her immediately.

She is currently being held at the Baku Pre-Trial Detention Center under the authority of the Ministry of Justice's Penitentiary Service.

== Early life ==
Aynur Telman gizi Gambarova was born on May 29, 1975, in the Aghdam District. While she was in the seventh grade, her articles were published in the district newspaper Lenin Yolu (“The Path of Lenin”). Aynur's childhood coincided with a difficult period – the time of the First Nagorno-Karabakh War. In June–July 1993, the Aghdam district was occupied by Armenian armed forces, and Aynur and her family were forced to leave their home region and live as refugees. She completed her secondary education in the city of Mingachevir (206 kilometers from Aghdam).

In 1994, she was admitted to the Azerbaijan State Pedagogical University named N. Tusi, and in 1998, she graduated with honors from the Faculty of Azerbaijani Language and Literature.

== Journalistic activity ==
Aynur Elgunesh began her journalistic career in 1996. From 1996 to 2005, she worked at the State Radio, and also held various positions in the print media — initially as a correspondent and later as a department head at the newspaper Cümhuriyyət (“Republic”), as deputy editor-in-chief of Yeni Qafqaz (“New Caucasus”), as well as a reporter for the newspapers Xalq Cəbhəsi (“People's Front”), Paritet (“Parity”), and Müstəqil (“Independent”). Her byline gained public recognition in the early 2000s.

In 2002, she completed a training program titled “Fundamentals of Journalism” offered by the BBC. In 2005, she undertook a journalism course at the Dutch School of Journalism.

From 2005 to 2007, she worked as a correspondent for the newspaper Gündəlik Azərbaycan (“Daily Azerbaijan”). She specialized as an investigative journalist, focusing primarily on socio-economic issues. Following the arrest of the newspaper's founder, Eynulla Fatullayev, in April 2007, and the shutdown of the publication in July of the same year, she was interrogated by the Ministry of National Security (MNS). In connection with this case, she was prohibited from leaving the country.

From 2007 to 2014, she worked as an independent journalist. During this period, she mainly collaborated with the newspapers Yeni Müsavat (“New Musavat”), Azadliq (“Freedom”), and Bizim Yol (“Our Path”). For a time, she also served as the editor of the magazine Yeni İqtisadiyyat (“New Economy”).

She served as the press secretary of the Azerbaijani National Committee of the Helsinki Citizens’ Assembly (hCa).

She contributed to the development of young journalists through training sessions and courses at the Baku School of Journalism (BJM) and the Institute for Democratic Initiatives (IDI). During the 2012–2013 academic year, she taught civic journalism at Baku Slavic University.

Since April 2014, she has been working at Meydan TV. She currently serves as the editor-in-chief of Meydan TV. She collaborates with various international media outlets, such as the Institute for War and Peace Reporting (IWPR) and ChaiKhana Media, and produces articles on a wide range of topics, including conflicts, politics, and human rights. Throughout her professional career, she has repeatedly faced detentions, resistance from law enforcement, and instances of mistreatment.

In February 2016, Aynur Elgunesh was summoned to the Investigative Department for Serious Crimes of the General Prosecutor's Office and was questioned as a witness in criminal case No. 142006023, which had been initiated on May 12, 2014, against a number of officials associated with Meydan TV.

On February 11, 2020, while covering a protest rally of parliamentary candidates near the administrative building of the Central Election Commission (CEC), Aynur Elgunesh, along with Meydan TV reporter Aytaj Tapdig, was detained by the police. As a result of the use of force by law enforcement officers, Aynur Elgunesh sustained minor bodily injuries. Reporters Without Borders (RSF) and the OSCE Representative on Freedom of the Media, Harlem Désir, strongly condemned the incident and stated that the Azerbaijani authorities are undermining media pluralism.

In February 2023, she was among 40 journalists who signed a position paper criticizing the Media Law of Azerbaijan—particularly its provisions for a centralized registry—for enabling widespread restrictions on press freedom.

== Criminal prosecution and travel ban (2015–2019) ==
In December 2015, during a trip to Ukraine, she was prohibited from leaving the country without explanation by border control officers of the State Border Service at Heydar Aliyev International Airport.

In February 2016, she was interrogated as a witness at the Investigation Department for Grave Crimes of the General Prosecutor's Office in connection with criminal case No. 142006023, which had been initiated on May 12, 2014, against a number of Meydan TV officials. Additionally, between 2015 and 2019, she was banned from leaving Azerbaijan.

In July 2017, she was again questioned by the Investigation Department for Grave Crimes of the General Prosecutor's Office.

In March 2016, Aynur Elgunesh filed a lawsuit challenging the travel ban. The Nasimi District Court in Baku, presided over by Judge Babek Panahov, reviewed her complaint against the travel restriction. The court rejected Aynur Elgunesh's request to lift the travel ban, citing her status as a witness in the ongoing investigation against Meydan TV officials by the General Prosecutor's Office. Elgunesh argued that, under Azerbaijan's Migration Code, a witness cannot be subjected to a travel ban and appealed the decision. However, in June of the same year, the Baku Court of Appeal upheld the lower court's ruling. Her lawyer, Elchin Sadigov, deemed the appellate decision unlawful and unfounded, stating:

“We will appeal to the European Court of Human Rights, claiming that this decision violates Articles 6 (Right to a fair trial), 10 (Freedom of expression), 13 (Right to an effective remedy), 18 (Limitation on use of restrictions on rights), and Article 2 (Freedom of movement) of Protocol No. 4 to the European Convention on Human Rights.”

— lawyer, Elchin Sadigov

The travel ban was lifted in May 2019 after four years.

On September 22, 2023, the European Court of Human Rights (ECtHR) delivered its judgment in the case of Aynur Gambarova and Others v. Azerbaijan. According to the ECHR's findings, the Azerbaijani authorities violated the journalists’ right to freedom of movement (Article 2 of Protocol No. 4 to the European Convention on Human Rights) and their right to an effective legal remedy (Article 13 of the Convention). The Court ordered the Azerbaijani government to pay each applicant €5,000 in moral damages and an additional €500 for legal expenses.

== Arrest and trial (2024) ==
Aynur Elgunesh and six other journalists—Meydan TV employees Aytaj Tapdig, Khayala Aghayeva, Aysel Umudova, Natig Javadly, freelance journalist Ramin Deko, as well as Deputy Director of the Baku Journalism School (BJM) Ulvi Tahirov—were arrested on December 6, 2024, at the Main Police Department of Baku within the framework of a criminal case initiated against Meydan TV. Each of them was charged under Article 206.3.2 of the Criminal Code of the Azerbaijan Republic (smuggling committed by a group of persons by prior conspiracy). They deny the charges and link the arrests to their professional activities.

On December 8, the investigative authority's motion regarding the choice of preventive measure against Aynur Elgunesh was reviewed. The Khatai District Court, chaired by Judge Sulhana Hajiyeva, examined the motions concerning the preventive measure of arrest. The investigative authority's motions were granted, and a preventive measure of arrest was imposed on each of the detainees, including Aynur Elgunesh, for a period of four months.

Aynur Elgunesh filed an appeal against the decision of the Khatai District Court dated December 8, 2024. On December 13, during a court hearing at the Baku Court of Appeals chaired by Judge Farid Eyubov, Aynur Elgunesh's appeal was dismissed. During the hearing, it became known that Judge Farid Eyubov was reviewing the appeal; however, the criminal case materials related to the matter under consideration were not presented to the court. Despite objections from the defense, he conducted the court session and within a few minutes announced the upholding of the decision to impose a preventive measure of arrest on the journalist for four months. Aynur Elgunesh stated that she had committed no crimes. However, since critical journalism is considered a crime in Azerbaijan and professional journalists are treated as criminals, she is currently imprisoned. Her lawyer, Elchin Sadigov, emphasized that the decision regarding the person whose rights he defends is unjustified.

On January 17, 2025, at the Khatai District Court, chaired by Judge Sulhana Hajiyeva, a petition to replace the preventive measure with house arrest for the employee was considered. During the court proceedings, Aynur Elgunesh emphasized that her arrest was a political decision made at the presidential level and told Judge Sulhana Hajiyeva that she was nobody to make decisions on this case. The court rejected the petition and upheld the detention order.

On March 7, 2025, Aynur Elgunesh's lawyer, Elchin Sadigov, submitted another petition to replace the preventive measure of arrest with house arrest. Although the defense stated that there were no legal grounds for keeping the journalist in custody, the Khatai District Court rejected the petition.

On March 14, 2025, the Khatai District Court reviewed the investigative authority's motion to extend the preventive measure of detention imposed on Aynur Elgunesh. According to the court's decision, Elgunesh's detention period was extended for an additional three months. “An absolutely unfounded decision. The four-month detention term of my client, Aynur Elgunesh, expires on April 6, but since the initial interrogation, no investigative actions have been carried out with her. The investigation has failed to provide compelling reasons to continue Elgunesh's detention. The court also disregarded Elgunesh's limited physical capabilities, as she is disabled—she has leg problems—and there are no special conditions for her in the detention center,” said Sadigov, who is defending Elgunesh's rights.

On June 24, 2025, the Khatai District Court, following a motion by the investigative authorities, extended the preventive measure against Aynur Elgunesh for the third time. Elchin Sadigov opposed the motion, stating that there was no need to prolong the detention period. Sadigov emphasized that the journalists had committed no crime. According to the defense, although the journalists were charged with smuggling, there was no convincing evidence to support this accusation. In her statement to the court, Aynur Elgunesh declared that the court should not act as a notary and simply endorse orders coming from above.

On July 4, 2025, the Baku Court of Appeals reviewed the appeal against the decision to extend the preventive measure of detention (dated June 24). The appeal was dismissed during the court session chaired by Judge Ramin Garagurbanli.

== International attention ==
The arrest of Meydan TV journalists has drawn sharp criticism. Influential international organizations have called on the Azerbaijani authorities to release the journalists. Leaders of opposition parties in Azerbaijan — including the Azerbaijani Popular Front Party (APFP), the Musavat Party, the Republican Alternative Party (REAL), and the National Council of Democratic Forces — issued statements condemning the arrests of Meydan TV journalists.

The international human rights organization Amnesty International condemned the arrests. "We condemn the recent arrests and call on the Azerbaijani authorities to immediately release the journalists and media workers. We feared a crackdown following COP29, and now we urge the participating states of the UN conference to respond to the ongoing persecution in Azerbaijan — a country that still holds the COP29 presidency," the organization stated. Amnesty International emphasized that the recent arrests of independent journalists, including staff from Meydan TV, are part of a broader crackdown that began a year ago, aimed at silencing critical and independent voices.

The press freedom organization Reporters Without Borders (RSF) also condemned the arrests of Meydan TV staff. In a message on the RSF account on the X platform, it said: "Reporters Without Borders condemn these new arrests and call for the immediate release of them and 13 other journalists held in disgraceful conditions on fabricated charges."

The New York-based Committee to Protect Journalists (CPJ) likewise denounced the arrests of Meydan TV staff: "Azerbaijani authorities must immediately release Natig Javadli, Khayala Aghayeva, Aytaj Tapdig, Aynur Elgunesh, Aysel Umudova, and Ramin Deko — along with more than a dozen other leading journalists detained on similar charges in recent months — and put an end to this unprecedented assault on the independent press," CPJ emphasized.

The international media rights organization Article 19 also condemned the arrests: "Just weeks after the climate summit in Baku, at least seven journalists — most of them from Meydan TV — were detained. These repressions are a stark reminder that Azerbaijan does not tolerate criticism or dissent. We must continue resisting the pressure on press freedom," the organization posted on its X (formerly Twitter) account.

The human rights organization Freedom Now also joined calls to end the pressure on the independent press in Azerbaijan: "Azerbaijan continues to harshly persecute independent journalists. The latest act of repression is the detention of five Meydan TV journalists on clearly politically motivated grounds. We call for their immediate release and an end to this persecution," the organization stated on its X account.

Women Press Freedom (WPF) in its statement supported Meydan TV and all journalists in Azerbaijan who continue risking their safety to report the truth: "Silencing the press is an attack on democracy," the WPF statement said.

The UK Ambassador to Azerbaijan, Fergus Auld, also sharply criticised the arrests: “The detention of Meydan TV journalists at the end of the COP29 climate conference is a slap in the face to democratic governments,” he wrote on his official X account.

=== US State Department response ===
On December 11, 2024, United States Secretary of State Antony Blinken issued a special statement regarding the arrests of activists and journalists in Azerbaijan and called on the country's authorities to release them. Baku accused Blinken of bias and rejected the claims of suppressing civil liberties. In his statement titled "Escalation of Repression Against Civil Society and Media in Azerbaijan," Blinken specifically mentioned Rufat Safarov, Sevinj Vagifgizi, Azer Gasimli, Farid Mehralizade, Bakhtiyar Hajiyev, recently detained Meydan TV staff, and many others arrested for their human rights work. The U.S. called on the Azerbaijani government to release them immediately, Blinken stated. "The United States is deeply concerned not only about these detentions but also about the increasing repression of civil society and media in Azerbaijan," the United States Department of State's statement emphasized. The Azerbaijani Ministry of Foreign Affairs responded negatively to Blinken's statement, accusing the U.S. State Department of interfering in the country's internal affairs. According to the ministry, such interference has continued "for the past four years," which has been "lost years for Azerbaijani-American relations."

== Documentary films ==
In 2022, she directed the documentary “Çinar ağacının kölgəsində” (In the Shadow of the Plane Tree). In the film, author Aynur Elgunesh returns to the city of Aghdam—where she had been displaced from as a teenager—28 years later, now as a journalist. Throughout the film, she searches for traces of her childhood in the streets of Aghdam and journeys through memories buried under the ruins.

The 18-minute film was produced by journalist and director Durna Safarova, with Matlab Mukhtarov serving as the cinematographer and editor. The documentary was screened at the Sarajevo Film Festival in August 2022.

In 2023, the film received a Special Jury Prize at the SevilleFest film festival.

== Awards ==
- In 2009, she was honored with the Media Key Award in the category of “Journalist of the Year.”
- In 2014, she received the Hasan bey Zardabi Award from the Azerbaijan Journalists’ Union.
- Also in 2014, she was awarded the OSCE Journalism Prize.
- In 2025, she was honored with the Wallis Annenberg Justice for Women Journalists Award.

== See also ==
- Media freedom in Azerbaijan
