= Aytaj Ahmadova =

Azerbaijani journalist

Aytaj Tapdig
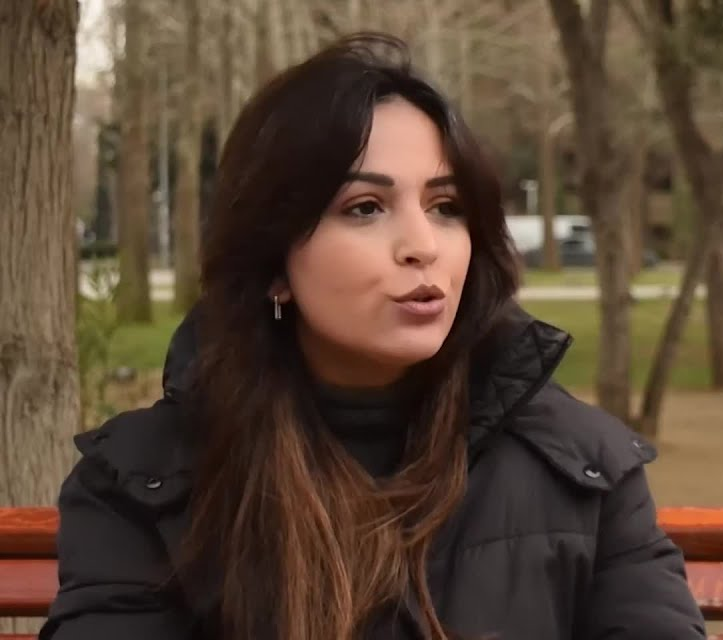
- Aytaj Tapdig in 2024
- Born: July 18, 1993 (age 33); Baku, Azerbaijan
- Citizenship: Azerbaijan
- Education: Azerbaijan State Pedagogical University
- Occupations: journalist, political prisoner
- Years active: 2014–present

Aytaj Soltan gizi Ahmadova (Azerbaijani: Aytac Soltan qızı Əhmədova), known professionally as Aytaj Tapdig (born July 18, 1993) is an Azerbaijani journalist, women's rights activist, and political prisoner. She has been working as a reporter for Meydan TV since 2015.

On December 6, 2024, she was arrested in connection with a criminal case filed against journalists from Meydan TV. On December 8, the Khatai District Court ordered her detention as a preventive measure. She and other detainees in the case were charged under Article 206.3.2 of the Azerbaijani Criminal Code (smuggling committed by a group of persons by prior conspiracy). Aytaj Tapdig denied the charges and attributed her detention to her professional journalistic activities.

Several local and international human rights organizations condemned the arrest of Aytaj Tapdig, calling it political and urged the Azerbaijani authorities to release her immediately.

She is currently (Aug 2026) being held at the Baku Pre-Trial Detention Center under the authority of the Ministry of Justice's Penitentiary Service and she has been denied medical care.

== Early years ==
Aytaj Ahmadova was born on July 18, 1993, in Baku. In 1999, she enrolled in the first grade of secondary school No. 8 in the Nasimi District. In 2010, she graduated from secondary school No. 158 in the Yasamal District.

In 2010, she was admitted to the Azerbaijan State Pedagogical University.

In 2014, she graduated from the Baku School of Journalism (BSJ).

== Journalistic career ==
Since 2015, Aytaj Ahmadova has worked as a reporter for Meydan TV. In 2022, she hosted the program MeyArt, which aired on Meydan TV. Throughout her professional career, she has repeatedly faced detentions, resistance from law enforcement, and instances of mistreatment.

In September 2015, she was abducted on the street by police officers and taken to the Main Department for Combating Organized Crime (MDCOC) of the Ministry of Internal Affairs of Azerbaijan, where she was interrogated about her journalistic activities. Later, in February 2016, she was summoned to the Department of Investigation of Serious Crimes under the General Prosecutor's Office and questioned as a witness in criminal case No. 142006023, initiated on May 12, 2014, against several Meydan TV staff members.

On October 3, 2018, Aytaj Ahmadova was detained while filming in the Zabrat settlement of the Sabunchu District and taken to the 15th Police Station of the Sabunchu District Police Department. The incident occurred around 7:00 PM. Ahmadova, who spent about three hours at the station, stated that she was subjected to physical pressure. Her tripod and camera were also confiscated. According to the journalist, a plainclothes police officer struck her in the face. In response to the incident, Orkhan Mansurzade, Deputy Head of the Press Service of the Ministry of Internal Affairs and Police Colonel, stated that claims about police pressure on Ahmadova were “far from the truth.” Ahmadova filed a complaint with the General Prosecutor's Office regarding the incident.

On May 23, 2019, she was again detained by police outside the Presidential Administration building and held for three hours at the 9th Police Station of the Sabail District Police Department.

On February 11, 2020, while covering a protest rally by parliamentary candidates in front of the Central Election Commission (CEC) building, Ahmadova, along with Aynur Elgunesh, the editor-in-chief of Meydan TV, was detained by the police. During the arrest, Ahmadova sustained minor bodily injuries due to the use of force by officers. Reporters Without Borders (RSF) strongly condemned the incident and accused the Azerbaijani authorities of destroying media pluralism.

On December 14, 2022, Ahmadova and her colleague from Meydan TV, Khayala Aghayeva, were detained while filming a protest on the Shusha-Khankendi road by "men in civilian clothing and black masks." Without providing any explanation, they were forced into a vehicle and sent back. Before being released, their phones were confiscated and all recorded materials were deleted.

In November 2024, Khayala Aghayeva and Aytaj Tapdig were detained by security personnel while covering a protest by animal rights activist K. Mammadli during the 29th session of the Conference of the Parties to the UN Framework Convention on Climate Change (COP29). The guards forcefully took Aghayeva and Ahmadova to a service area and then escorted them out of the event venue.

Aytaj Ahmadova has actively participated in feminist rallies held annually on March 8 from 2019 to 2024, demanding that the Azerbaijani government ratify the Istanbul Convention, aimed at ensuring gender equality in labor and education, and combating violence against women. She played a significant role in organizing the events and voiced the movements’ resolutions. In 2021, she was detained by the police during one such protest and taken to a police station.

== Criminal prosecution and travel ban (2015–2019) ==
On September 16, 2015, Aytaj Ahmadova was detained by the police and taken to the Main Department for Combating Organized Crime (MDCOC) of the Ministry of Internal Affairs of Azerbaijan. Ahmadova was detained together with a journalism intern at around 4:00 PM in the Yasamal District of Baku. At the MDCOC, both were questioned about the activities of Meydan TV, its leadership, journalists' salaries, and specifically about a video that showed the body of Bahruz Hajiyev, who had died while in custody at the Mingachevir City Police Department — a case that had sparked public protests. Authorities sought to determine who had filmed and distributed the video. Ahmadova was released at around 9:00 PM the same day. The Executive Director of Meydan TV, Emin Milli, stated that her detention was a form of pressure on Meydan TV.

Many local and international human rights organizations — including Human Rights Watch, Reporters Without Borders (RSF), and Amnesty International — strongly condemned the abduction of Aytaj Ahmadova on the street and her interrogation at the Main Department for Combating Organized Crime.

Aytaj Ahmadova filed a complaint with the General Prosecutor's Office regarding the incident. According to her lawyer, Zibeyda Sadigova, Ahmadova was detained by officers of the Ministry of Internal Affairs on September 16, 2015, due to her collaboration with Meydan TV. She was illegally searched, her computer was confiscated, and she was subjected to torture as well as inhuman and degrading treatment while in police custody. However, Rustam Usubov, the First Deputy Prosecutor General, issued a decision to refuse to open a criminal case. Sadigova stated that she would pursue justice for Aytaj Ahmadova at the European Court of Human Rights.

On February 5, 2016, Aytaj Ahmadova was interrogated as a witness in a criminal case launched by the Department for Investigation of Serious Crimes under the General Prosecutor's Office, targeting certain senior staff members of Meydan TV. Between 2015 and 2019, she was subjected to a travel ban that prevented her from leaving Azerbaijan. In June 2016, Ahmadova filed a lawsuit challenging the travel restriction. On June 30, the Nasimi District Court of Baku, presided over by Judge Elman Isaev, reviewed her complaint. According to Ahmadova, a representative of the Prosecutor's Office stated in court that the travel ban was related to the ongoing criminal case against Meydan TV personnel. The court ultimately refused to hear the complaint, suggesting she instead appeal to the Administrative-Economic Court, which handles disputes involving government agencies. Ahmadova's lawyer, Zibeyda Sadigova, argued that the travel ban was unjustified: “Aytaj Ahmadova is neither a suspect nor an accused in the case. This ban is illegal because it violates her right to freedom of movement and creates grounds for unjust persecution linked to her professional journalistic activity.” Azerbaijani lawyer Yalchin Imanov also disagreed with the court's position, stating that since the complaint was filed in connection with a criminal investigation, the issue of restricting freedom of movement should fall under the jurisdiction of a general court.

On July 14, the Baku Court of Appeal rejected Aytaj Ahmadova's appeal against the travel ban and upheld the decision of the Nasimi District Court.

On September 5, the Sabail District Court reviewed Aytaj Ahmadova's complaint regarding her unlawful detention by officers of the Main Directorate for Combating Organized Crime of the Ministry of Internal Affairs. Judge Elmar Rahimov declined to review the case. Her lawyer, Zibeyda Sadigova, stated that under Article 451 of the Criminal Procedure Code, the judge was obligated to declare the decision either lawful or unlawful: “In other words, the judge's refusal to rule on the legality of the detention is itself illegal,” Sadigova said.

In July 2017, she was again interrogated by the Department for Investigation of Serious Crimes under the General Prosecutor's Office.

On September 21, 2023, the European Court of Human Rights (ECtHR) delivered its judgment in the case of Aynur Gambarova and others vs. Azerbaijan. According to the ECHR's findings, the Azerbaijani authorities violated the journalists’ right to freedom of movement (Article 2 of the European Convention on Human Rights) as well as their right to an effective remedy (Article 13 of the Convention). The Court ordered the government to pay each applicant 5,000 euros in compensation for moral damages and an additional 500 euros to cover legal costs.

In March 2025, the European Court of Human Rights issued a judgment in the case of Aytaj Ahmadova. Ahmadova claimed that in September 2015, officers from the Organized Crime Department of the Ministry of Internal Affairs conducted a search of her apartment and confiscated her computer without a warrant or court order. Some of her personal photos and videos taken at home and on the beach with her family were subsequently published on various Facebook accounts, likely operated by fake profiles. Ahmadova argued that her right to respect for private life was violated under Articles 6 (right to a fair trial) and 8 (right to respect for private and family life) of the European Convention on Human Rights, and that the authorities failed to investigate her complaints in this regard. The Court found that there was a violation of Article 8 of the Convention in Ahmadova's case. According to the ruling, the government was ordered to pay her 5,500 euros in compensation for moral damages and legal costs.

== Arrest and trial (2024) ==
On December 6, 2024, Aytaj Ahmadova and six other journalists — Aynur Elgunesh (editor-in-chief of Meydan TV), reporters Khayala Aghayeva, Aysel Umudova, Natig Javadly, freelance journalist Ramin Deko, and Ulvi Tahirov (Deputy Director of the Baku School of Journalism) — were arrested at the Baku Main Police Department as part of a criminal case initiated against Meydan TV. All of them were charged under Article 206.3.2 of the Criminal Code of the Republic of Azerbaijan — “smuggling committed by a group of individuals by prior conspiracy.” The journalists deny the charges and link their arrests to their professional activities.

On December 8, the investigative authority filed a motion for pre-trial detention against Aytaj Ahmadova. The Khatai District Court, presided over by Judge Sulhana Hajiyeva, reviewed the motion and ruled in favor of it, ordering four months of pre-trial detention for all the detainees, including Ahmadova.

Ahmadova filed an appeal against the December 8 decision. On December 13, during a hearing at the Baku Court of Appeal chaired by Judge Elbey Allahverdiyev, her appeal was denied. During the trial, Ahmadova pleaded not guilty. Her lawyer, Javad Javadov, argued that issuing arrest warrants for journalists, including Ahmadova, without any evidence of involvement in currency smuggling violated Articles 5 (right to liberty and security) and 18 (prohibition of politically motivated restrictions) of the European Convention on Human Rights.

On January 23, 2025, the Khatai District Court reviewed a motion to replace pre-trial detention with house arrest. During the hearing, lawyer Javad Javadov stated that there was no reasonable basis for keeping Ahmadova in custody and that no preliminary evidence had been presented to support the currency smuggling accusation. Ahmadova herself claimed her arrest was politically motivated. The investigator opposed the release, citing the ongoing investigation and the risk of interference. The court denied the motion for release.

On January 30, 2025, the Baku Court of Appeal reviewed the appeal of the January 23 decision. Javadov once again emphasized that there were no grounds for pre-trial detention. Ahmadova stated:

"I’ve worked for Meydan TV for over 10 years. I’m a journalist, not a smuggler. The real smugglers are those leading this country."

— Aytaj Ahmadova

The investigative body opposed house arrest, arguing that Ahmadova might evade investigation. The court upheld the previous decision and rejected her appeal.

On March 6, 2025, a second motion was filed to replace pre-trial detention with house arrest. The Khatai District Court once again rejected the request, and Ahmadova remained in custody.

On March 12, 2025, the Baku Court of Appeal reviewed her appeal against the March 6 decision. After the hearing, lawyer Javad Javadov stated that despite all evidence presented by the defense, the court upheld the lower court's ruling.

On April 3, 2025, the Khatai District Court reviewed a motion from the investigative authority to extend Ahmadova's detention. The court granted the request and extended her pre-trial detention by another three months.

On June 24, 2025, the Khatai District Court, once again at the request of investigators, extended her detention for a third time.

On July 4, 2025, the Baku Court of Appeal reviewed an appeal against the June 24 extension. The appeal was rejected during a session presided over by Judge Anar Ibrahimov. She was denied access to medical care in August 2026.

== International attention ==
The arrest of Meydan TV journalists has drawn sharp criticism. Influential international organizations have called on the Azerbaijani authorities to release the journalists. Leaders of opposition parties in Azerbaijan — including the Azerbaijani Popular Front Party (APFP), the Musavat Party, the Republican Alternative Party (REAL), and the National Council of Democratic Forces — issued statements condemning the arrests of Meydan TV journalists.

The international human rights organization Amnesty International condemned the arrests. "We condemn the recent arrests and call on the Azerbaijani authorities to immediately release the journalists and media workers. We feared a crackdown following COP29, and now we urge the participating states of the UN conference to respond to the ongoing persecution in Azerbaijan — a country that still holds the COP29 presidency," the organization stated. Amnesty International emphasized that the recent arrests of independent journalists, including staff from Meydan TV, are part of a broader crackdown that began a year ago, aimed at silencing critical and independent voices.

The press freedom organization Reporters Without Borders (RSF) also condemned the arrests of Meydan TV staff. In a message on the RSF account on the X platform, it said: "Reporters Without Borders condemn these new arrests and call for the immediate release of them and 13 other journalists held in disgraceful conditions on fabricated charges."

The New York-based Committee to Protect Journalists (CPJ) likewise denounced the arrests of Meydan TV staff: "Azerbaijani authorities must immediately release Natig Javadli, Khayala Aghayeva, Aytaj Tapdig, Aynur Elgunesh, Aysel Umudova, and Ramin Deko — along with more than a dozen other leading journalists detained on similar charges in recent months — and put an end to this unprecedented assault on the independent press," CPJ emphasized.

The international media rights organization Article 19 also condemned the arrests: "Just weeks after the climate summit in Baku, at least seven journalists — most of them from Meydan TV — were detained. These repressions are a stark reminder that Azerbaijan does not tolerate criticism or dissent. We must continue resisting the pressure on press freedom," the organization posted on its X (formerly Twitter) account.

The human rights organization Freedom Now also joined calls to end the pressure on the independent press in Azerbaijan: "Azerbaijan continues to harshly persecute independent journalists. The latest act of repression is the detention of five Meydan TV journalists on clearly politically motivated grounds. We call for their immediate release and an end to this persecution," the organization stated on its X account.

Women Press Freedom (WPF) in its statement supported Meydan TV and all journalists in Azerbaijan who continue risking their safety to report the truth: "Silencing the press is an attack on democracy," the WPF statement said.

The UK Ambassador to Azerbaijan, Fergus Auld, also sharply criticised the arrests: “The detention of Meydan TV journalists at the end of the COP29 climate conference is a slap in the face to democratic governments,” he wrote on his official X account.

=== US State Department response ===
On December 11, 2024, United States Secretary of State Antony Blinken issued a special statement regarding the arrests of activists and journalists in Azerbaijan and called on the country's authorities to release them. Baku accused Blinken of bias and rejected the claims of suppressing civil liberties. In his statement titled "Escalation of Repression Against Civil Society and Media in Azerbaijan," Blinken specifically mentioned Rufat Safarov, Sevinj Vagifgizi, Azer Gasimli, Farid Mehralizade, Bakhtiyar Hajiyev, recently detained Meydan TV staff, and many others arrested for their human rights work. The U.S. called on the Azerbaijani government to release them immediately, Blinken stated. "The United States is deeply concerned not only about these detentions but also about the increasing repression of civil society and media in Azerbaijan," the United States Department of State's statement emphasized. The Azerbaijani Ministry of Foreign Affairs responded negatively to Blinken's statement, accusing the U.S. State Department of interfering in the country's internal affairs. According to the ministry, such interference has continued "for the past four years," which has been "lost years for Azerbaijani-American relations."

== See also ==
- Media freedom in Azerbaijan
