= Khayala Aghayeva =

Azerbaijani journalist

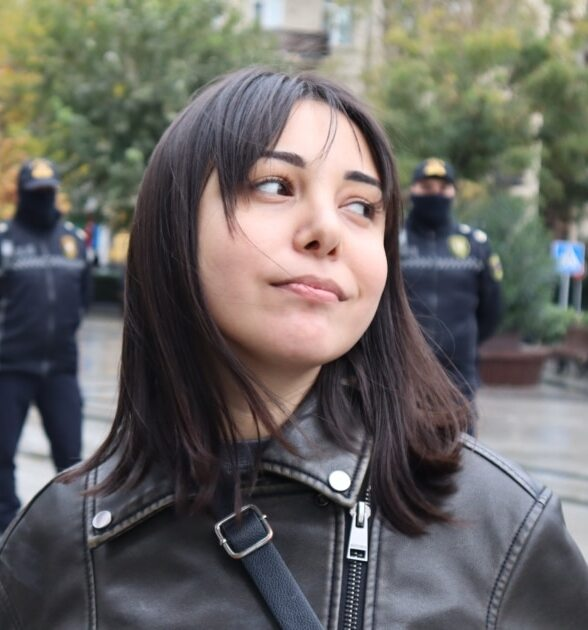
- Khayala Aghayeva in 2023
- Born: January 18, 1997 (age 29); Masallı, Azerbaijan
- Citizenship: Azerbaijan
- Occupations: journalist, political prisoner
- Years active: 2015–

Khayala Aghayeva (full name: Khayala Zakir gizi Aghayeva; (Azerbaijani: Xəyalə Zakir qızı Ağayeva); born January 18, 1997, Masallı) is an Azerbaijani journalist, women's rights activist, and political prisoner. Since 2015, she had been working as a reporter for Meydan TV.

On December 6, 2024, she was arrested as part of a criminal case initiated against Meydan TV journalists. Khayala Aghayeva and six other journalists detained in the case were charged under Article 206.3.2 of the Criminal Code (smuggling committed by a group of persons with prior agreement). Several local and international human rights organizations condemned the arrest of Khayala Aghayeva, calling it political and urged the Azerbaijani authorities to release her immediately.

Aghayeva is currently being held in the Baku Pretrial Detention Center of the Penitentiary Service under the Ministry of Justice.

== Early years and journalistic career ==
Khayala Aghayeva was born on January 18, 1997, in Masallı. She studied at the Baku College of Communication.

Since 2015, she had been working as a reporter for Meydan TV. During her professional career, she has repeatedly faced detentions, police resistance, and ill-treatment.

On May 29, 2019, Aghayeva was detained while covering a protest in front of the Presidential Administration building in the course of her journalistic duties. She was held for over two hours at the 9th police station of the Sabail District Police Department and was later released.

On October 19, 2019, she was detained by police while doing her journalistic work during an opposition rally in Baku. Aghayeva was held for several hours at the Nasimi District Police Department and then released.

On July 14–15, 2020, during a protest in front of the National Assembly, Khayala Aghayeva faced pressure from the police while carrying out her professional duties: her phone and press credentials were confiscated.

On December 14, 2022, Aghayeva, and her Meydan TV colleague Aytaj Tapdig, traveled to film a protest on the Shusha–Khankendi road but were detained by "men in civilian clothes and black masks." Without any explanation, they were forced into a car and sent back. Before being released, their phones were confiscated and their materials deleted.

In November 2024, Aghayeva and Aytaj Tapdig were detained by security personnel while covering a protest by animal rights activist K. Mammadli during the 29th session of the Conference of the Parties to the UN Framework Convention on Climate Change (COP29). The guards forcefully took Aghayeva and Ahmadova to a service area and then escorted them out of the event venue.

== Arrest and trial ==
On December 6, 2024, Aghayeva and six other journalists — Meydan TV editor-in-chief Aynur Elgunesh, reporters Aytaj Tapdig, Aysel Umudova, Natig Javadli, freelance journalist Ramin Deko, and deputy director of the Baku School of Journalism (BJM) Ulvi Tahirov — were arrested at the Baku City Main Police Department as part of a criminal case initiated against Meydan TV. Each of them was charged under Article 206.3.2 of the Criminal Code of Azerbaijan (smuggling committed by a group of persons in prior collusion). According to Khayala Aghayeva's lawyer, Nazim Musayev, she does not admit guilt and believes the charges are directly linked to her journalistic activities. "Aghayeva did not report physical abuse. However, she was subjected to psychological pressure. Specifically, she was forced to testify before her lawyer arrived. After I began representing her, she exercised her right to retract the initial testimony given in the absence of legal counsel," Musayev said.

On December 8, the investigating authority's motion for pretrial detention was reviewed. At the Khatai District Court, presided over by Judge Sulhana Hajiyeva, the motions for arrest were upheld. A pretrial detention measure of four months was imposed on all detainees, including Khayala Aghayeva. She denied the charges and reiterated that her arrest was linked to her professional work. Her lawyer, Nazim Musayev, called the court's decision unfounded: "This is an absolutely groundless decision. My client, Khayala Aghayeva, didn't even understand the basis of the charges. She was simply taken from her home. The arrest petition was written in vague terms, and no concrete evidence was presented. Of course, we will appeal the arrest."

Aghayeva appealed the Khatai District Court's decision from December 8. On December 13, at a hearing in the Baku Court of Appeal, presided over by Judge Zaur Huseynov, her appeal was rejected and the pretrial detention was upheld. Her lawyer, Nazim Musayev, stated that the investigator from the Baku City Main Police Department failed to justify Aghayeva's arrest in court. "I asked whether Khayala Aghayeva had brought money into the country, either openly or secretly, through customs. The investigator said no. I asked, 'Then why did you arrest her?' He replied, 'We will prove that she was involved too,'" Musayev said.

On January 14, 2025, the Khatai District Court, presided over again by Judge Sulhana Hajiyeva, reviewed a motion to replace Aghayeva's pretrial detention with house arrest. During the hearing, lawyer Nazim Musayev argued: "If Khayala Aghayeva worked at customs and had millions, she would be free now. But all her wealth is her freedom of speech, her voice, and the reports she prepared. That is why she is in prison." Investigator Nijat Osmanov from the Baku City Main Police Department also attended the hearing. The court rejected the defense's request.

Aghayeva appealed the Khatai District Court's decision from January 14. On January 17, the Baku Court of Appeal rejected her appeal and upheld the pretrial detention.

On March 14, 2025, the Khatai District Court reviewed a motion from the investigative body to extend Aghayeva's pretrial detention. The court granted the request and extended her detention for another three months.

On June 24, 2025, the Khatai District Court, at the request of the investigative bodies, extended the preventive measure of Ahgayeva for the third time.

On July 2, 2025, the Baku Court of Appeal considered an appeal against the ruling on the extension of the preventive measure in the form of detention (dated June 24). The appeal was rejected during a court hearing chaired by Judge Ibrahim Ibrahimli.

== International attention ==
The arrest of Meydan TV journalists has drawn sharp criticism. Influential international organizations have called on the Azerbaijani authorities to release the journalists. Leaders of opposition parties in Azerbaijan — including the Azerbaijani Popular Front Party (APFP), the Musavat Party, the Republican Alternative Party (REAL), and the National Council of Democratic Forces — issued statements condemning the arrests of Meydan TV journalists.

The international human rights organization Amnesty International condemned the arrests. "We condemn the recent arrests and call on the Azerbaijani authorities to immediately release the journalists and media workers. We feared a crackdown following COP29, and now we urge the participating states of the UN conference to respond to the ongoing persecution in Azerbaijan — a country that still holds the COP29 presidency," the organization stated. Amnesty International emphasized that the recent arrests of independent journalists, including staff from Meydan TV, are part of a broader crackdown that began a year ago, aimed at silencing critical and independent voices.

The press freedom organization Reporters Without Borders (RSF) also condemned the arrests of Meydan TV staff. In a message on the RSF account on the X platform, it said: "Reporters Without Borders condemn these new arrests and call for the immediate release of them and 13 other journalists held in disgraceful conditions on fabricated charges."

The New York-based Committee to Protect Journalists (CPJ) likewise denounced the arrests of Meydan TV staff: "Azerbaijani authorities must immediately release Natig Javadli, Khayala Aghayeva, Aytaj Tapdig, Aynur Elgunesh, Aysel Umudova, and Ramin Deko — along with more than a dozen other leading journalists detained on similar charges in recent months — and put an end to this unprecedented assault on the independent press," CPJ emphasized.

The international media rights organization Article 19 also condemned the arrests: "Just weeks after the climate summit in Baku, at least seven journalists — most of them from Meydan TV — were detained. These repressions are a stark reminder that Azerbaijan does not tolerate criticism or dissent. We must continue resisting the pressure on press freedom," the organization posted on its X (formerly Twitter) account.

The human rights organization Freedom Now also joined calls to end the pressure on the independent press in Azerbaijan: "Azerbaijan continues to harshly persecute independent journalists. The latest act of repression is the detention of five Meydan TV journalists on clearly politically motivated grounds. We call for their immediate release and an end to this persecution," the organization stated on its X account.

Women Press Freedom (WPF) in its statement supported Meydan TV and all journalists in Azerbaijan who continue risking their safety to report the truth: "Silencing the press is an attack on democracy," the WPF statement said.

The UK Ambassador to Azerbaijan, Fergus Auld, also sharply criticised the arrests: "The detention of Meydan TV journalists at the end of the COP29 climate conference is a slap in the face to democratic governments," he wrote on his official X account.

=== US State Department response ===
On December 11, 2024, United States Secretary of State Antony Blinken issued a special statement regarding the arrests of activists and journalists in Azerbaijan and called on the country's authorities to release them. Baku accused Blinken of bias and rejected the claims of suppressing civil liberties. In his statement titled "Escalation of Repression Against Civil Society and Media in Azerbaijan," Blinken specifically mentioned Rufat Safarov, Sevinj Vagifgizi, Azer Gasimli, Farid Mehralizade, Bakhtiyar Hajiyev, recently detained Meydan TV staff, and many others arrested for their human rights work. The U.S. called on the Azerbaijani government to release them immediately, Blinken stated. "The United States is deeply concerned not only about these detentions but also about the increasing repression of civil society and media in Azerbaijan," the United States Department of State's statement emphasized. The Azerbaijani Ministry of Foreign Affairs responded negatively to Blinken's statement, accusing the U.S. State Department of interfering in the country's internal affairs. According to the ministry, such interference has continued "for the past four years," which has been "lost years for Azerbaijani-American relations."

== See also ==
- Media freedom in Azerbaijan
