= Jabbar Guliyev =

Jabbar Guliyev Cabbar Quliyev
- Born: 19 May 1922; Zahmat, Erivan uezd, Armenian SSR, TSFSR
- Died: September 2004 (aged 82); Baku, Azerbaijan
- Occupation: painter
- Awards: Honored Artist of the Armenian SSR

Jabbar Ali oghlu Guliyev (Azerbaijani: Cabbar Əli oğlu Quliyev, 19 May 1922 — September 2004) was the Honored Artist of the Armenian SSR (1967), member of the Union of Artists of Azerbaijan.

== Biography ==
Jabbar Guliyev was born on 19 May 1922 in Zahmat village, Zangibasar District, Armenia. In 1941, he graduated from Yerevan State Pedagogical College. He participated in the World War II and was an active member of the partisan movement in Italy and Yugoslavia.

He graduated from Azerbaijan State Art Institute. From 1961 to 1988, he worked as a teacher at the Yerevan State Pedagogical Institute.

In 1967, he was awarded the honorary title of Honored Artist of the Armenian SSR. During his 50-year career as an artist, he created more than 4,000 works and held 23 solo exhibitions. His works are kept in museums and private collections of more than 20 countries of the world.

In 1988, he moved to Azerbaijan due to the Armenian-Azerbaijani conflict. Here he was accepted as a member of the Union of Artists of Azerbaijan.
