= Rapid Police Unit =

Police tactical unit of Azerbaijan

Rapid Police Unit patch

The Rapid Police Unit (Azerbaijani: Çevik Polis Alayı), formally Separate Rapid Police Unit (Əlahiddə Çevik Polis Alayı), is the tier two police tactical unit within the Ministry of Internal Affairs of Azerbaijan that specialized in quick response to emergencies with SWAT unit tactics. The unit is headquartered in Baku, at 69 Nobel Avenue. As of 2019, the unit commander is Sahlab Bagirov, who succeeded Zaur Abdullayev in that capacity.

Until 2006 the Rapid Police Unit was within the purview of the Baku Police Department. On 31 July 2006 the unit was incorporated into the Ministry of Internal Affairs, becoming able to operate on a country level. Since 30 September 2017 the unit also employs women. The Rapid Police Unit was used to disperse the 2019 Baku protests, among others.

== See also ==
- Special Purpose Police Unit
