= Mayis Aghabeyov =

Azerbaijani artist

- Born: Mayis Əlişir oğlu Ağabəyov; 1 May 1941; Baku, Azerbaijan SSR
- Died: 17 June 2020; Baku, Azerbaijan
- Known for: Artist, cinema production designer
- Awards: People's Artist of Azerbaijan (2020)

Mayis Alishir oghlu Aghabeyov (b.1 May 1941; Baku, Azerbaijan SSR, Soviet Union - d. 17 June 2020; Baku, Azerbaijan) was a Soviet and Azerbaijani artist and cinema production designer, People's Artist of Azerbaijan (2000).

== Life ==
Aghabayov was born on May 1, 1941, in Baku. In 1961 he graduated from the Azerbaijan State Art School. In 1969, after graduating from the All-Union State Institute of Cinematography in Moscow, he started working as a production designer at the Azerbaijanfilm film studio. From 1996 he taught at the Azerbaijan State University of Culture and Arts. He was a professor of the Academic painting department at the Azerbaijan State Academy of Fine Arts. Aghabeyov died on June 17, 2020, at the age of 79 in Baku.

== Awards ==
- Honored Artist of the Republic of Azerbaijan (the first time) - March 4, 1992
- Honored Artist of the Republic of Azerbaijan (the second time) - February 3, 1993
- People's Artist of Azerbaijan - December 18, 2000
