= Zakir Garalov =

Azerbaijani politician (born 1956)

Zakir Bəkir oğlu Qaralov

Prosecutor General of the Republic of Azerbaijan
- In office 26 April 2000 – 1 May 2020

Personal details
- Born: January 13, 1956 (age 70) Dmanisi, Georgian SSR
- Party: New Azerbaijan Party

Zakir Bakir oglu Garalov (Azerbaijani: Zakir Bəkir oğlu Qaralov) (born January 13, 1956), sometimes rendered Zakir Qaralov, is a Georgian-born Azerbaijani politician who served as the Prosecutor General of the Republic of Azerbaijan, an office equivalent to the attorney general in other countries. Garalov is a member of the ruling New Azerbaijan Party and was the prosecutor general for 11 years. He formerly served as the chief prosecutor in Ganja. He is related to influential party official and longtime MP Zahid Garalov.

== Prosecutor General of Azerbaijan ==
In 2005, Garalov raised eyebrows when he accused the parliamentary opposition of collusion with Armenia and warned that Armenian-backed government opponents were plotting a revolution against President Ilham Aliyev's government.

In his capacity as prosecutor general, Garalov defended the arrest of journalist Eynulla Fatullayev in 2007, alleging that his website threatened state-sponsored terrorism by Iran against Azerbaijani government buildings. He claimed that Fatullayev's detention and imprisonment should not be taken as signs that Azerbaijan does not uphold freedom of the press.

Garalov benefited under a 2009 law that lifted restrictions on how many terms a prosecutor general could serve, as he was reappointed and confirmed to his current position in 2010, less than a year later.

In 2011, Garalov said that his office would take action against government officials suspected of corruption and bribery. "In order to require the same attitudes from others and have the moral rights for investigation [of] corrupt officials' activity, we must start fighting against corruption from ourselves," he added, criticizing the "luxurious lifestyle" of some Azerbaijanis as evidence of corruption.

After the outbreak of the 2011 protests against the Azerbaijani government, Garalov vowed to "suppress" the demonstrations and said that the experience of "other countries", presumably a reference to Egypt, Libya, and Tunisia, would not be repeated in Azerbaijan. Ahead of a planned protest in mid-April, Garalov accused opposition leaders Ali Karimli and Isa Gambar with acting on orders from foreign governments and summoned both leaders for interrogation, after which they were released.

On 1 May 2020 Garalov was succeeded by Kamran Aliyev as the Prosecutor General. The decision was approved at the plenary meeting of the National Assembly upon President Ilham Aliyev's proposal.
