= Khachpar =

Khachpar Խաչփառ
- Location within Armenia Location within Ararat
- Coordinates: 40°07′33″N 44°24′11″E
- Country: Armenia
- Province: Ararat
- Municipality: Masis

Population (2011)
  - Total: 2,049
- Time zone: UTC+4
  - Summer (DST): UTC+5

Khachpar (Armenian: Խաչփառ; Azerbaijani: Zəhmət) is a village in the Masis Municipality of the Ararat Province of Armenia. The village was populated by Azerbaijanis before the exodus of Azerbaijanis from Armenia after the outbreak of the Nagorno-Karabakh conflict. In 1988-1989 Armenian refugees from Azerbaijan settled in the village.
