= Azer Gasimli =

- Azər Ağaqasım oğlu Qasımlı
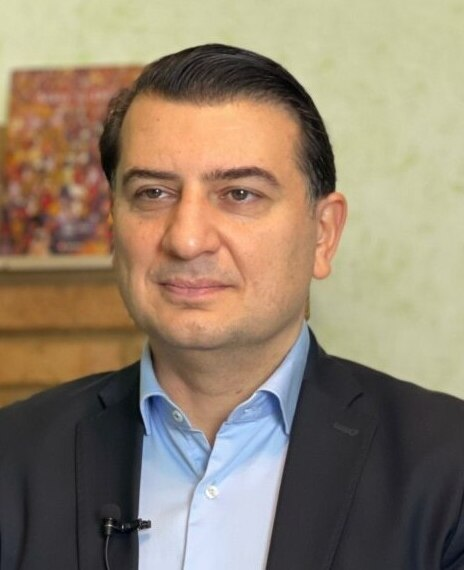
- Azer Gasimli in 2024
- Born: Azer Agagasim oghlu Gasimli; 31 March 1975 (age 51); Baku, Azerbaijan
- Education: State Institute of Social Management and Political Science (B); Azerbaijan State Art Institute (B); Marmara University (M); Moscow State University (PhD)
- Occupation: politician
- Years active: 1994–
- Organization: Republican Alternative Party (2011–2019)
- Political party: Musavat Party (1994–2010); Republican Alternative Party (2018–2019)
- Spouse: Samira Gasimli

Azer Gasimli (Azerbaijani: Azər Ağaqasım oğlu Qasımlı; born 31 March 1975) is an unaffiliated Azerbaijani politician and political scientist who has been leading as the Director of the Institute of Political Management since 2021. He served as a board member of the REAL Movement and Chairperson of the Party Assembly of the Republican Alternative Party during 2011-2019.

== Early life ==
Azer Gasimli was born on March 31, 1975, in Baku. His father, Aghagasim Gasimov, had PhD in geology and was a professor at the Azerbaijan State Oil and Industrial Institute, while his mother, Shafiga Nasrullayeva, was a philologist.

== Education and Academic Career ==
Gasimli attended the Institute of Social Management and Political Sciences from 1994 to 1998, graduating with a Bachelor distinction diploma.

He attended a one-year program at the Turkish Language and Literature Department of Aegean University in Izmir from 1998 to 1999. After graduating from a one-year program in 2000, Gasimli attended the International Relations and Political Sciences Department at Marmara University in Istanbul from 1999 to 2001, graduating with a master's degree. He studied under Ahmet Davutoglu at Marmara University.

In 2009, he defended his thesis on ‘The Formation of the Political Regime in Azerbaijan’ at Moscow State University and received a PhD in Politics.

From 2008 to 2009, Gasimli published a series of articles in the Polish Political Studies Journal (a Moscow-based scientific, cultural, and educational journal in political science and political sociology).

== Civil society contributions ==
While studying for his bachelor's degree, Gasimli undertook a research position with the Far Centre's Political Ideologies in the Azerbaijan project, which Freedom House supported. In 1996, he authored brochures on Liberalism and Nationalism in Azerbaijan. During the 1998 presidential elections, brochures authorised by him on election technologies were published as part of the projects of the Inam Pluralism Center.

== Business career ==
From 2006 to 2010, he served as CEO of the Alliance Group (now defunct company).

== Political career ==
=== Musavat years ===
Gasimli joined the Musavat Party in 1994. He actively participated in the Party's political functioning from 1994 to 1998, rising to the positions of the First Deputy of the Youth Branch from 1995 to 1996 and the Secretary for Political Advocacy of the Yasamal District Branch from 1997 to 1998. He resigned from the Musavat Party in 2010.

=== REAL years ===
On 28 May 2018, Gasimli was the primary organiser of the Republican March commemorating the centennial of the establishment of the Azerbaijan Democratic Republic. The Republican March attracted the participation of various political and civil society groups and is regarded as one of the demonstrations in the modern political landscape of Azerbaijan. On 29 May 2018, Gasimli was apprehended by the OGP and charged with disobeying police orders as a misdemeanour of the offence under the Code of Administrative Offenses. Based on the citations of the OGP, the Yasamal District Court sentenced him to 30 days of administrative imprisonment. He pleaded not guilty at the hearing, stating that accusations against him were politically motivated and bogus; the ulterior motive behind them was retribution for his role in organising the Republican March. Subsequently, the OGP indirectly acknowledged that the real reason for his arrest was his role in the March. Despite his appeal, the Baku Court of Appeal dismissed the appeal. Gasimli lodged a complaint to the ECtHR, raising violations of the rights to liberty and fair trial. The ECtHR instituted proceedings concerning his complaint and communicated the application to the Government of Azerbaijan. Before the ECtHR, the Government of Azerbaijan submitted a unilateral declaration acknowledging the violation of his rights to liberty and fair trial rights regarding administrative imprisonment, and ECtHR confirmed the acknowledgement.

On 26 November 2019, after severe internal disagreements, Gasimli resigned from the REAL Party and his positions, stating his opposition to the REAL's political switching from the principal opposition party and the violation of intra-party democracy for these purposes by them.

In 2016, REAL unsuccessfully tried to form a referendum initiative opposing the referendum on the constitutional amendments establishing an official super-presidential regime in Azerbaijan (because of the harsh pressure from the national authorities, REAL terminated the initiative). Due to this initiative activities, Gasimli was summoned by the Office of General Prosecutor (OGP) and warned. Subsequently, the OGP imposed a travel ban on him. After exhausting national legal remedies, Gasimli lodged a complaint to the ECtHR, stating a violation of his free movement rights. In 2018, the ECtHR found a violation of his free movement rights regarding the complaint. In 2019, the OGP lifted the travel ban as an implementation of the ECtHR's judgment.

After two years of switching process, the REAL Party was established in 2018. Gasimli was elected Chairperson of the Party Assembly and became an ex officio board member with consultative voting rights.

=== Post-REAL unaffiliated period ===
Currently, Gasimli is an unaffiliated politician.

Gasimli ran as a candidate for snap parliamentary elections in 2020 as an influential member of the Action Electoral Bloc (Hərəkət Seçki Bloku). He was again faced with significant electoral falsifications.

In March 2021, he established the Institute for Political Management (IPM), a Baku-based think tank, as co-founder and was elected its Director, which he currently executes.

Due to its activities, the IPM is being pressured by the national authorities. It has been forced out of its official premises, and Emin Ibrahimov, the ex-diplomat and IPM-affiliated staff, has been detained and indicted since July 2024 on politically motivated and bogus assault charges.

Gasimli regularly posts statements on his social media accounts about current affairs and interviews various national and international media outlets, including RLC, Toplum TV, Turan Information Agency, RFE/RL Azerbaijan, Meydan TV, BBC Azerbaijani, and VoA Azerbaijani.

== Political positions ==
Gasimli takes a right-centrist position in the political spectrum.

== Personal life ==
He married Samira Gasimli, a political psychologist and manager of the RLC, a local online media outlet, and has three children.
