= Kamran Aliyev (lawyer) =

Prosecutor General of the Republic of Azerbaijan

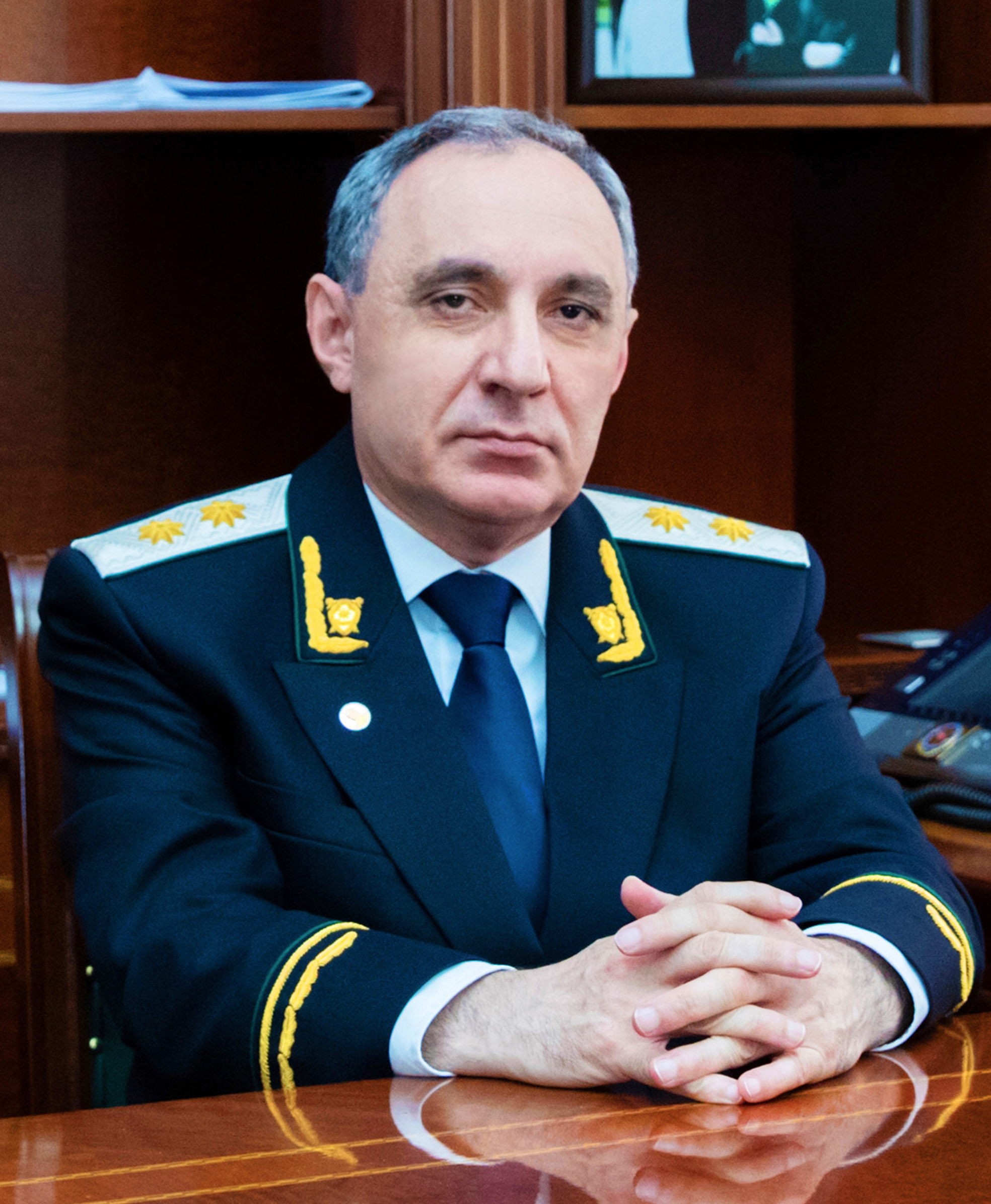

Prosecutor General of the Republic of Azerbaijan
- Incumbent
- Assumed office 1 May 2020

Personal details
- Born: November 18, 1965 (age 60) Balakən, Azerbaijan SSR
- Education: Irkutsk State University
- Occupation: politician, lawyer
- Awards: Azerbaijani Flag Order, For Service to the Fatherland Order

Kamran Bayram oglu Aliyev (Azerbaijani: Kamran Bayram oğlu Əliyev) is a Prosecutor General of the Republic of Azerbaijan (since 2020) and a vice-president of the International Association of Prosecutors, State Judicial Adviser of the first class (2021).

== Biography ==
Kamran Aliyev was born in Balaken on November 18, 1965. In 1987, he graduated from the Faculty of Law of Irkutsk State University. In 1993, he received a PhD in law. Then Kamran Aliyev joined the Prosecutor's Office of the Republic of Azerbaijan. In 2007, he was appointed Director of the Anti-Corruption Department of the Prosecutor General of the Republic of Azerbaijan. On May 1, 2020, he was appointed as the Prosecutor General of the Republic of Azerbaijan. On November 23, 2021, he was appointed as a of State Adviser of Justice of the first degree.

After his first term as Prosecutor General concluded on May 1, 2025, the Milli Majlis approved his reappointment to the post on the recommendation of the President of Azerbaijan.
