= 2019 Baku protests =

Rallies in Azerbaijan

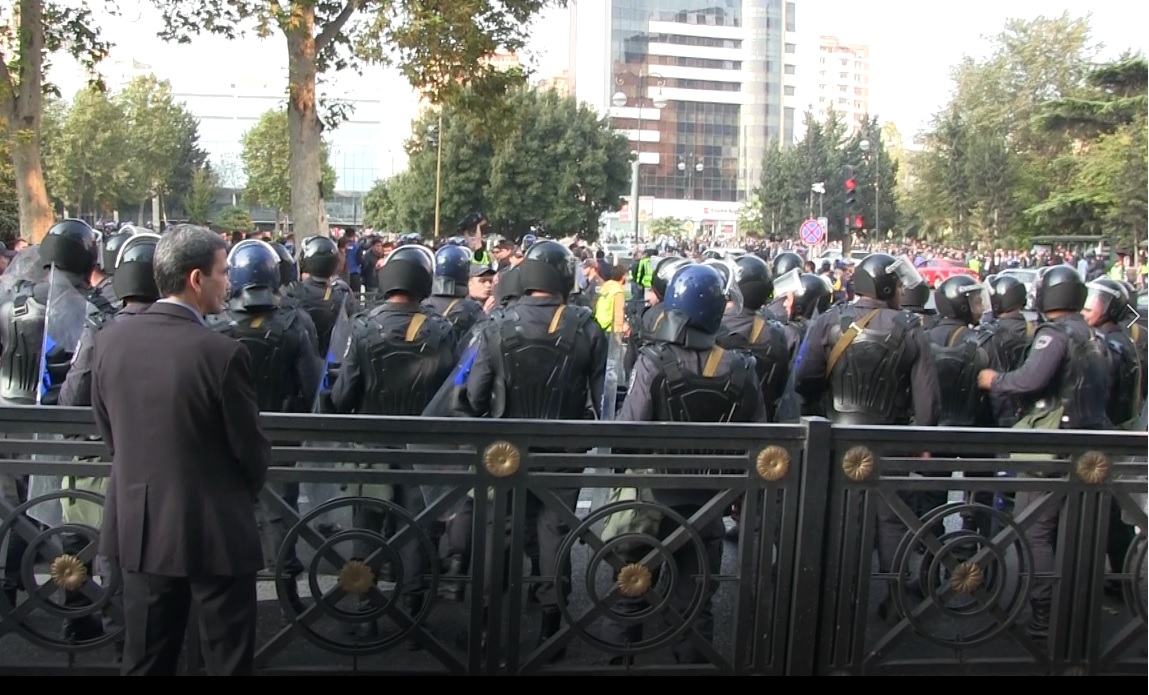
- Police facing off the protesters in 19 October
- Date: 8, 19 and 20 October, 2019
- Location: Baku, Azerbaijan
- Goals: Release of political prisoners, free and fair elections, resignation of president Ilham Aliyev
- Methods: Demonstrations, civil resistance, nonviolent resistance

Parties
| Azerbaijani police Rapid Police Unit | National Council of Democratic Forces; Other protesters |

Number
| Hundreds (on 19 October) | 220 (on 19 October) |

Casualties
- Detained: on 19 October: 60 (police claim) more than 80 (Reuters)

Nonviolent rallies took place in Baku, the capital of Azerbaijan, on 8, 19 and 20 October 2019. The protests on 8 and 19 October were organized by the National Council of Democratic Forces (NCDF), an alliance of opposition parties, and called for the release of political prisoners and for free and fair elections. They were also against growing unemployment and economic inequality. Among those detained on 19 October was the leader of the Azerbaijani Popular Front Party, Ali Karimli.

== Background ==
Although the Constitution of Azerbaijan allows peaceful assembly after notifying the relevant government body in advance, in practice Azerbaijani government requires such assemblies to have a permission from local municipalities. The women's request for a rally was rejected by the authorities on the grounds that the proposed site had many shops and restaurants and was therefore unsuitable.

== Protests ==
On 8 October NCDF organized a protest in support of the freedom of assembly. The participants gathered in front of the Baku mayor's office, protesting against the decision of city officials to deny permission for a rally at the Mahsul Stadium in central Baku. The protesters were instead offered an area in Lokbatan, around 20 km away from Baku. Some fifty demonstrators were allowed to protest at the venue, while several dozen more who were barred from joining the protest tried to break through the police cordon. They were dispersed and some of them were detained. News media were also not allowed to cover the event. According to police, seventeen protesters were reprimanded for violating the "mass demonstrations law," while four received administrative protocols for the same reason.

Before the 19 October protest police cordoned off several streets in central Baku, the operation of three metro stations (28 May, Jafar Jabbarly and Shah Ismail Khatai) was suspended and the internet access was restricted. The Baku Police Department declared the 19 October protest "unlawful". Hundreds of members of the Rapid Police Unit were deployed. On that day Ali Karimli was arrested and detained by police shortly after he began joining the protest in central Baku. He was released late in the evening. According to police, sixty protesters were detained, of them forty-two were released with a "warning".

On 20 October protesting women gathered near a statue of Khurshidbanu Natavan on Baku's Nizami Street and were met with police, who demanded they leave the site. Apart from posters, the protesters also wrote the same slogans on their clothes, fearing that the posters would be torn apart by police. Several protesters wore slogans commemorating Elina Hajiyeva, a teenager who had committed suicide in Baku earlier that year because of school bullying.

== Reactions ==
In a statement on 19 October, the European Union called "on the authorities to release peaceful protesters remaining in detention", noting that "freedom of assembly is a fundamental human right and we expect Azerbaijan to ensure that it can be fully exercised, in line with the country's international obligations". Member of the European Parliament Kati Piri stated that "the violence was accompanied by a state-run smear campaign against the opposition and civil society activists, including an unprecedented attack on the EU diplomats fulfilling their professional tasks". Another Member of the European Parliament Tonino Picula urged Federica Mogherini and the European Commission "to suspend further negotiations on the new agreement between the EU and Azerbaijan until the Azerbaijani government commits itself fully to the respect of fundamental rights".

The US embassy in Baku called on "the government to credibly investigate reports of police violence, hold accountable those responsible, and release expeditiously those who remain in detention". The embassy also noted that "freedom of assembly and freedom of speech are universal human rights guaranteed in Azerbaijan's Constitution".

Former Ambassador of Azerbaijan to Benelux Arif Mammadov staunchly criticized Azerbaijani authorities for violent crackdown of the 19 October protest.

Human Rights Watch criticized the Azerbaijani authorities for refusing to allow the peaceful assembly of opposition.

== See also ==
- 2003 Azerbaijani protests
- 2011 Azerbaijani protests
- 2013 Baku protests
- 2020 Azerbaijani protests
