= Azadliq (newspaper) =

Newspaper in Azerbaijan

- Format: A3
- Editor-in-chief: Ganimat Zahid
- Founded: 24 December 1989; 35 years ago
- Language: Azerbaijani
- Headquarters: Baku, Azerbaijan
- Website: www.azadliq.info

Azadliq (Azerbaijani: Azadlıq; English: 'freedom') a daily political newspaper, is one of the most popular newspapers in Azerbaijan.

Azadliq was founded in 1989 as a weekly newspaper aligned with the Azerbaijani Popular Front Party. The first issue was released on 24 December 1989, with Najaf Najafov as its first editor. In 1991, Ganimat Zahid (born 10 February 1963) took over as editor. Azadliq has been published daily since 1996.
