= National Council of Democratic Forces =

Alliance of opposition parties in Azerbaijan

The National Council of Democratic Forces (NCDF, Azerbaijani: Demokratik Qüvvələrin Milli Şurası, informally the National Council, Milli Şura) is an alliance of opposition parties of Azerbaijan. NCDF includes the Azerbaijani Popular Front Party, Open Society, the Forum of Intellectuals and the El movement. The stated goals of NCDF is the "protection of human rights, achieving the environment of free and fair elections reflecting the opinion of the people, in particular ensuring the right to freedom of assembly, removing pressures on independent media and civil society". The stated final goal of NCDF is the establishment of "a democratic state with rule of law, and to achieve integration of Azerbaijan into the Euro-Atlantic arena".

NCDF was established in 2013, ahead of the 2013 presidential elections in which Ilham Aliyev won a third term. On 7 June 2013, Rustam Ibragimbekov was elected as the group's chairman. NCDF nominated Jamil Hasanli as its joint presidential candidate, he came second in the official voting results. In 2019 NCDF organized a series of protests in Baku, advocating particularly for the release of political prisoners and for free and fair elections.
