= Farid Mehralizade =

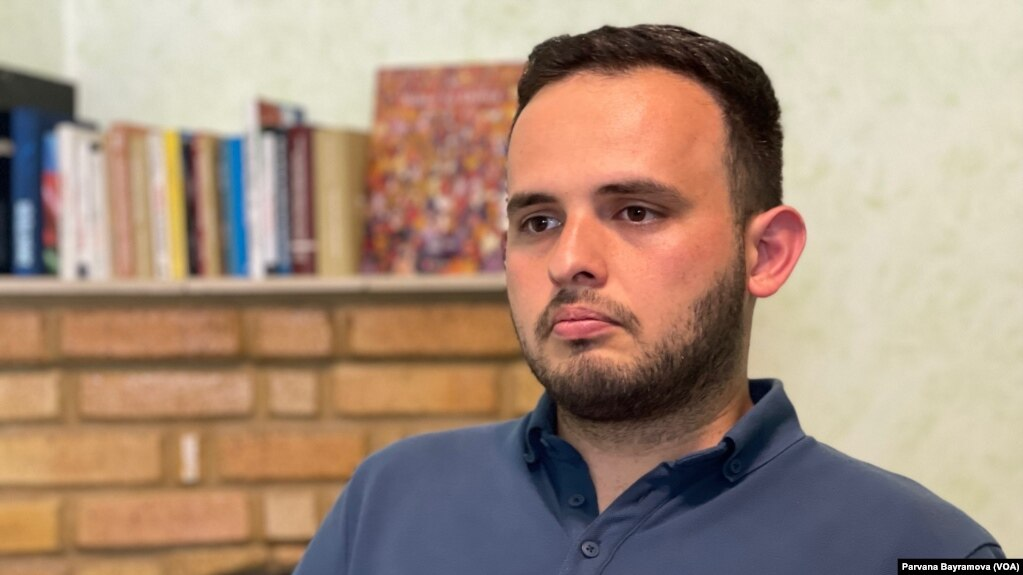
- Born: November 22, 1994 (age 31); Azerbaijan Azerbaijan, Baku
- Education: Azerbaijan State Economic University
- Website: https://freefarid.info/

Farid Mehralizade (born 22 November 1994) is an Azerbaijani economist, civil society representative and political prisoner. His analyses focused on the policy issues related to the economy, welfare, education and climate. He contributed to multiple platforms, including Baku Research Institute and Akinchi. He was arrested on 30 May 2024 amidst an ongoing crackdown on independent media and NGOs in Azerbaijan.

== Early life and education ==
Mehralizade was born on 22 November 1994 in Baku, where he went to school. He got his bachelor's degree in finance from the Azerbaijan State University of Economics in 2016. Mehralizada served in the military in 2017. He completed his master's degree in Economic Policy at Istanbul University in 2019. He participated in the International Visitor Leadership Program of the US Department of State in April 2024.

== Career ==
Alongside his career as a financial analyst in the private sector, since 2019, Farid Mehralizade has emerged as a reputable economist within Azerbaijan's civic sphere. He regularly published analytical articles, policy papers, and opinions, and provided critical insights through interviews for media and TVs. The areas of Mehralizade's analytical work included economic inequality and the gender aspects thereof, social and educational policies, effects of climate change and more.

In his articles and policy briefs published by Baku Research Institute, Mehralizade critically analyzed the topics of financing of higher education, shortcomings of human capital, issues of minimum wage, socio-economic causes of internal migration, the level of societal trust in the government's economic policies and more in the context of Azerbaijan.

Performing as an interviewer at the Akinchi online educational platform, Mehralizade discussed a variety of socio-economic problems, including the dutch disease in Azerbaijan's economy, the country's dependence on fossil fuels, and issues related to public interest representation.

As a renowned economist, Farid Mehralizade regularly touched upon the pressing challenges of climate change and social justice in Azerbaijan. “Despite heated discussions on the development of the non-oil sector of the economy, still 90 percent of exports and 50 percent of budget savings are formed at the expense of the oil and gas sector,” Mehralizade noted. In a commentary to independent media outlet Meydan TV, he spoke about the severity of the water shortage problem facing the country on the one hand and significant levels of water waste resulting from government's reluctance to deal with the problem on the other.

Before his arrest, Farid Mehralizade gave his last interview to Abzas Media where he pointed to the failure of the government to raise the minimum wage to the levels targeted in the country's development policy documents. Abzas Media has been under assault of the Azerbaijani government due to the media outlet's consistent investigations into the grand corruption. Six employees of Abzas Media have been arrested since 2023, and law enforcement also linked Farid Mehralizade's arrest to the Abzas Media case.

== Arrest and detention ==
Farid Mehralizada was kidnapped by people in civilian clothes on his way to work at one of the central streets of Baku on May 30, 2024. It became clear that he was unlawfully detained when he was brought to his apartment for a search in the afternoon. A search was conducted at the address where the economist lived. During the search, Mehralizade requested the presence of his lawyer, but it was not allowed by law enforcement officers, who confiscated all devices, documents and a car that belonged to Farid Mehralizade and his wife, Nargiz Mukhtarova, at their apartment.

According to the information given by his wife Nargiz Mukhtarova to the local media, Mehralizade was beaten and ill-treated when he was detained: "Farid was badly treated, they put a bag on his head when he was kidnapped and taken away." While detaining Mehralizade, law enforcement officers in civilian clothes put a bag on his head and took him by force. Mehralizade was taken to a nearby place, which he could not identify, and detained there for some time with a bag on his head. Only when he was at the Main Police Department of Baku City, a bag was removed from his head and he was able to determine where he was.

Mehralizade's lawyer was not allowed to enter Main Police Department of Baku City until 18:30. On June 1, 2024, criminal proceedings were instituted against the applicant under Article 206.3.2 of the Criminal Code. On June 1, 2024, the Khatai District Court ordered the applicant's pre-trial detention for a period of three months and 20 days on the charge of “smuggling on preliminary arrangement by group of persons” in the Abzas Media case. Neither the court's nor the investigator's decision contained any single evidence confirming Mehralizade's involvement in the so-called Abzas case. Abzas Media also released a statement and declared that it had no cooperation with Mehralizade.

Mehralizada appealed that there was no justification for his detention. On 6 June 2024, the Baku Court of Appeal dismissed the appeal, reiterating the reasons given by the lower instance. His lawyers lodged an application to the Khatai District Court, asking for a release on bail or under house arrest. On 3 July 2024, the Khatai District Court dismissed the application and on 10 July 2024, the Baku Court of Appeal upheld the decision.

== Calls for release ==
Reacting to the arrest of Farid Mehralizade, on 5 July, the United States Department of State Spokesperson Matthew Miller stated: “We are deeply troubled by continued arrests of members of Azerbaijani civil society. Those who exercise their fundamental rights, including freedom of expression, should not face arrest for doing so. And we continue to urge the Azerbaijani government to immediately release all individuals who are unjustly detained and to respect human rights and fundamental freedoms of all.”

On 24 June, a group of senior Azerbaijani economists called on the respective state authorities to release Farid Mehralizade.

On October 24, 2024, the European Parliament adopted a resolution denouncing human rights violations in Azerbaijan and calling for the release of Farid and other political prisoners.

U.S. Secretary of State Antony Blinken also called for the release of Mehralizade and other journalists jailed in Azerbaijan.

25 civil society organizations, including the Committee to Protect Journalists, Human Rights Watch, PEN America, and Reporters Without Borders, issued a statement on September 11, 2024, calling on the Azerbaijani government to release all defendants in the Abzas Media case.
