= Prosecutor General's Office of Azerbaijan =

- Azərbaycan Respublikasının Baş Prokurorluğu
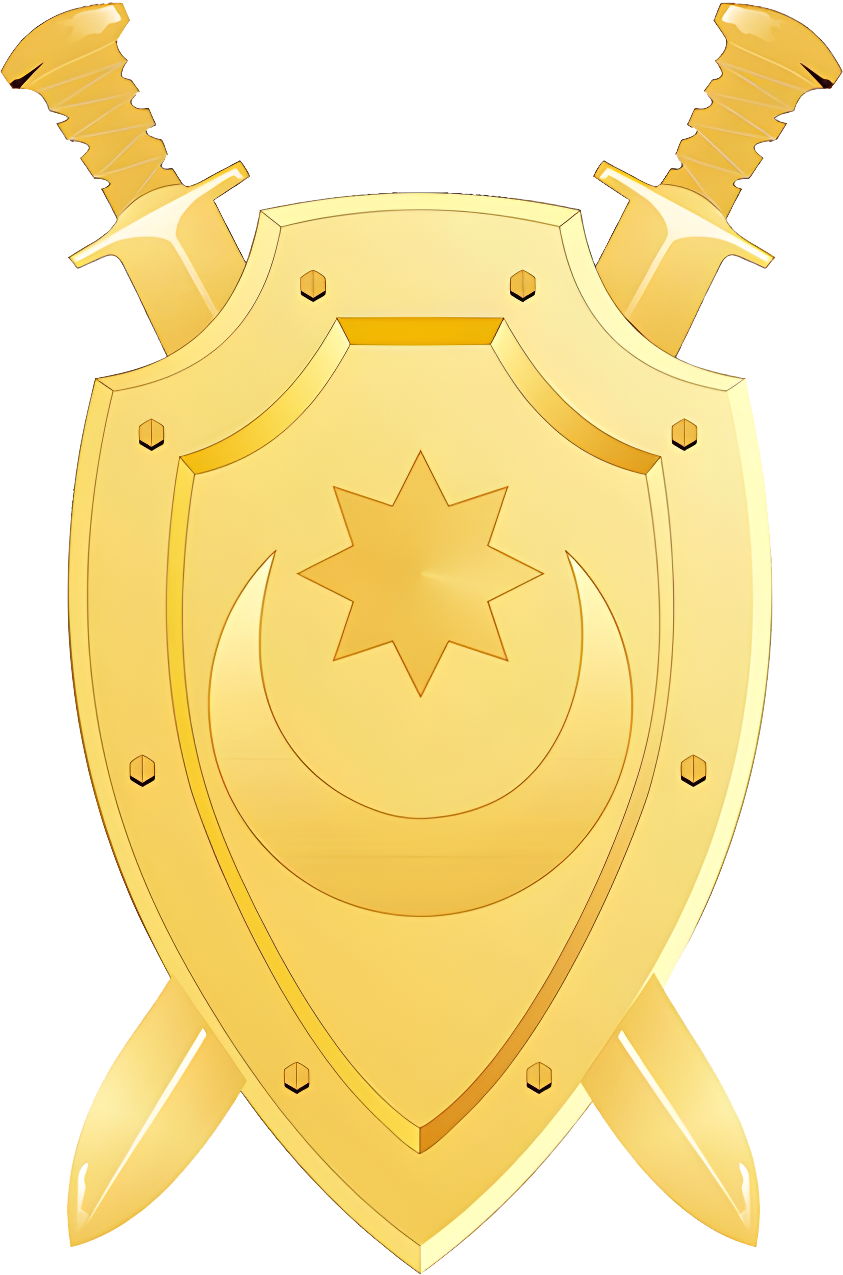

Agency overview
- Formed: 1 October 1918
- Headquarters: Baku
- Minister responsible: Kamran Aliyev
- Website: https://genprosecutor.gov.az/az

The General's Prosecutor Office of the Republic of Azerbaijan (Azerbaijani: Azərbaycan Respublikası Baş Prokurorluğu) is an agency responsible for managing the criminal investigation and public prosecution in the Republic of Azerbaijan. Although the Azerbaijan constitution nominally guarantees judicial independence, the executive firmly controls prosecutors and judges. Judges and prosecutors collaborate in Azerbaijan to repress political opponents.

== Overview ==
The powers of the Prosecutor’s Office of the Republic of Azerbaijan are defined in the Constitution 1995, Criminal Procedure Code 2000 and other laws. According to Article 133 of the Constitution 1995, the Prosecutor's Office:

- exercises control over the execution and application of laws;
- institutes criminal cases and conducts investigations (limited range of offences);
- has exclusive power to prosecute on behalf of the state in all criminal courts;
- institutes lawsuits (in a limited range) and appeals against court judgements.

Unlike many other jurisdictions, the Prosecutor's Office of Azerbaijan belongs to the Judicial Branch of Power. The Prosecutor’s Office operates as a single centralised body based on the subordination of territorial and specialised prosecutors to the Prosecutor General (PG) of the Republic of Azerbaijan. The PG is appointed and dismissed by the President of the Republic of Azerbaijan, with the consent of the Milli Majlis (Parliament) of the Republic of Azerbaijan. Apart from the prosecutors and supporting staff, there are also criminal investigators and detectives within the Prosecutor's Office of Azerbaijan. Criminal investigators of the Prosecutor's Office have exclusive jurisdiction over a limited range of serious offences, including crimes against the person, corruption, money laundering, etc. The Anticorruption Directorate (anti-corruption agency) is the only entity of the Prosecutor's Office that employs detectives.

In addition to its main functions predominantly in the criminal law area, the Prosecutor's Office is entitled to submit drafts of the legislative proposals directly to the Parliament, a function by enjoyed by few agencies. Prosecutors are empowered to initiate administrative (quasi-criminal) and disciplinary proceedings and submit motions for the elimination of conditions and circumstances conducive to criminal offences, which they discover in the course of their activity. These motions are mandatory for consideration by state and private institutions. Finally, prosecutors have limited authority to represent the state institutions and vulnerable citizens in civil court proceedings.

Former President Heydar Aliyev established 1 October as a professional holiday of the Office in July 1998.

== History ==
The history of the prosecuting authorities in the independent Azerbaijan state began after the establishment of the Azerbaijan Democratic Republic. Regulation on the Chamber of the Court of Azerbaijan was approved by the Council of Ministers on November 18, 1918.

Fatali Khan KHOYSKI, Khalil Bay KHASMAMMADOV, A.Safikurdski, T.Makinski were Ministers of Justice and chief prosecutors as well of the Azerbaijan Democratic Republic. Azerbaijan Democratic Republic was collapsed on April 28, 1920, at the invasion of 11th Army (RSFSR). Declaration of the Azerbaijani Soviet Socialist Republic ensued. The prosecution and investigation bodies were also abolished along with the public authorities after the collapse of Independent Azerbaijan Statehood.

Taking into account the need of establishment of a special body to control activities of all authorities in this period, the Soviet Prosecutor's Office was founded in Azerbaijan SSR with the decree of the Central Executive Committee of Azerbaijan ‘On the Public Prosecutor's Office of Azerbaijani SSR’ dated July 11, 1922. After the restoration of independence in 1991, the Prosecutor's Office of Azerbaijan was established according to the Constitutional Provision, Prosecutor's Office Act 1999 and the Prosecutor's Office (Service) Act 2001. In order to part with the legacy and turn into a democratic institution, it has undergone substantial reforms.

== System of the Prosecutor's Office of the Republic of Azerbaijan ==
- General Prosecutor's Office of the Republic of Azerbaijan (Main Body)
- Anti-Corruption Directorate with the Prosecutor General
- Military Prosecutor's Office of the Republic of Azerbaijan
- Prosecutor's Office of Nakhchivan Autonomous Republic (NAR)
- Military Prosecutor's Office of NAR
- Metropolitan Prosecutor's Office of Baku city
- District (city) prosecutor's offices of the republic
- Territorial military prosecutor's offices
- District (city) prosecutor's offices of (NAR)
- District prosecutor's offices of Baku city

== Structure of the Prosecutor's Office ==
=== Management ===
- Prosecutor General of the Republic of Azerbaijan - (Kamran Aliyev since May 1, 2020)
- First Deputy Prosecutor General of the Republic of Azerbaijan
- Deputy Prosecutor General of the Republic of Azerbaijan
- Deputy Prosecutor General - ex officio Head of the Anti-Corruption Directorate
- Deputy Prosecutor General - ex officio Military Prosecutor of the Republic of Azerbaijan
- Senior assistants and assistants to the Prosecutor General

=== Departments ===
General Prosecutor's Office:

- 4 Departments overseeing the implementation of laws in the course of (pre-trial) criminal inquiry and investigation, as well as operational-search activities (special investigation means) by the following institutions:
- Prosecutor's Office (regional bodies) - except for SIM
- Internal Affairs Bodies (Mainly police)
- Ministries of Justice and Taxes, and the State Customs Committee
- National Security and Emergency Situations, the State Border Service
- Department for Public Prosecution (Court Unit)
- Department for the Consideration of Applications
- Organizational and Analytical Department
- HR Department
- Department of International Relations
- Department of Legal Support and Information
- Science and Education Center (Department)
- Department of Logistics

==== Anti-Corruption Directorate with the Prosecutor General ====
Anti-Corruption Directorate with the Prosecutor General of the Azerbaijan Republic was established by the Order № 114 of the President of the Azerbaijan Republic dated March 3, 2004. Anti-Corruption Directorate with the Prosecutor General is a specialised law enforcement anti-corruption agency. It is an autonomous Prosecution Service operating in the field of Special Investigation Techniques and criminal pre-trial investigation. According to the Operational Search Act 1999, it is the body with an exclusive power to carry out SIMs in the fight against corruption. The ACD structure is as follows,

- ACD Investigation Department
- ACD Analysis and Information Department
- ACD Preventive Measures and Inquiry Department
- ACD Operational Department (SIM)
- ACD Operational Support Division (SIM Tech Support)
- ACD Internal Security Division
- ACD Specialist Division
