= Meydan TV =

Berlin-based Azerbaijani non-profit media organization

Meydan TV logo

Meydan TV is a Berlin-based Azerbaijani non-profit media organization. Founded by dissident blogger and former political prisoner Emin Milli, political refugee blogger Habib Muntazir, filmmaker Fardi Huseynvand and musician Jamal Ali in 2013, Meydan TV publishes news in Azerbaijani, English, and Russian. In May 2013, Meydan TV announced plans for broadcasting simultaneously through the Turkish Türksat communications. The word "meydan" means town square in Azerbaijani.

The media organization, known for its reporting on corruption and human rights abuses in Azerbaijan, has been targeted for repression by the authoritarian Aliyev regime in Azerbaijan.

== News coverage ==
Meydan TV gained prominence for its reports and online broadcasts on corruption, human rights and other issues in Azerbaijan, which have been used by the international media, particularly during the 2015 European Games in Baku when several reporters and foreign observers were barred from the country. Meydan TV is a partner of the Organized Crime and Corruption Reporting Project. Several reports of Meydan TV were made with the support of European Endowment for Democracy (EED) organization.

During the 2015 European Games Azerbaijani channel Lider TV interviewed a local man who posed as a foreigner in order to create a "provocation". After Meydan TV identified the interviewee as Seymur Seferov, a displaced Azerbaijani citizen from the Jabrayil Rayon, the Lider TV report on purported foreigner went viral in Azerbaijani social media. In 2015 it was reported that several Meydan TV journalists were prosecuted, arrested or received travel bans (including Aynura Ismayil, Shirin Abbasov, Ayten Farhadova and Aysel Umudova). According to Ali Hasanov, Meydan TV website and several other media outlets were not following the accreditation rules for foreign media representatives in Azerbaijan approved on 18 March 2015.

On 9 April 2016, Azerbaijani website Haqqin.az accused Meydan TV of overestimation of Azerbaijani casualties during the 2016 Armenian–Azerbaijani clashes. Meydan TV which put the number of military casualties at 94 instead of officially stated 31 compiled the list according to posts in social networks. Haqqin.az stated that soldier Aidyn Hasanov listed by Meydan TV among those killed was actually treated in a military hospital for arm injury.

== Arrests and detentions ==
According to Reporters Without Borders, President Ilham Aliyev launched “a new wave of fierce repression against the country’s last remaining journalists” in late 2023. Meydan TV's entire newsroom staff was detained in December 2024.

On 6 December 2024, Aysel Umudova and Khayala Aghayeva were arrested by Baku police along with four other Meydan TV journalists as part of what became known as the “Meydan TV case.” All six jailed journalists maintained their innocence and viewed the case as politically motivated, a stance echoed by local human rights defenders who immediately recognized them as de facto political prisoners.

== See also ==
- Abzas Media
- Media freedom in Azerbaijan
