= Serial arrests of journalists in Azerbaijan =

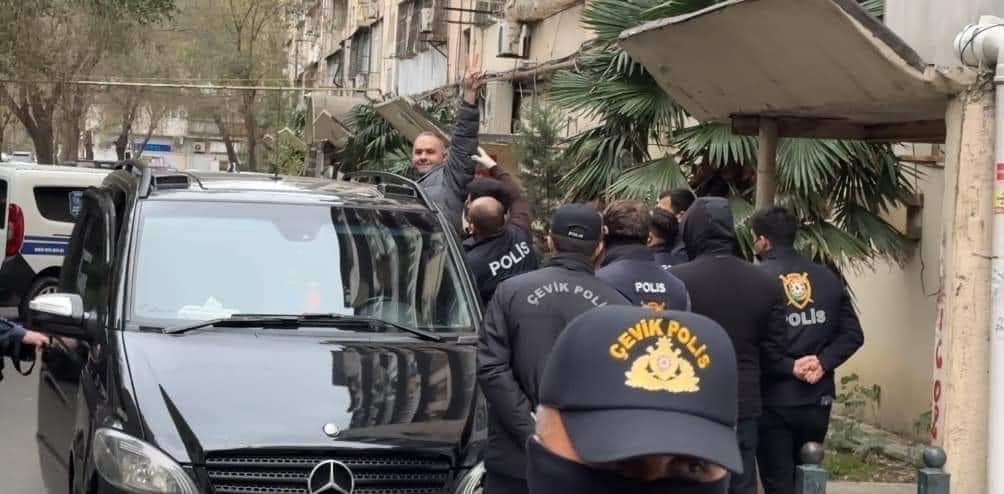
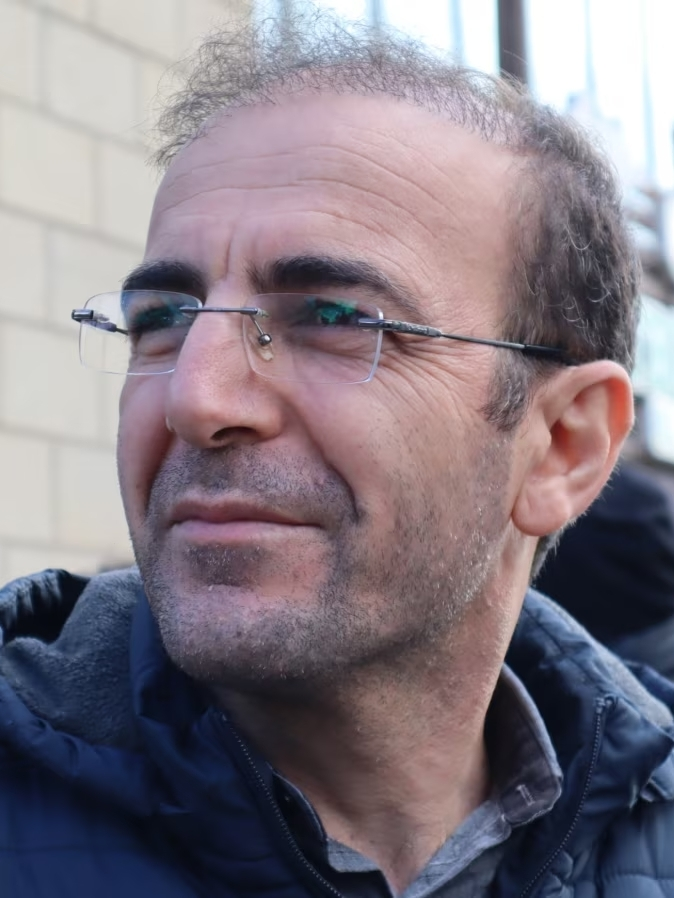
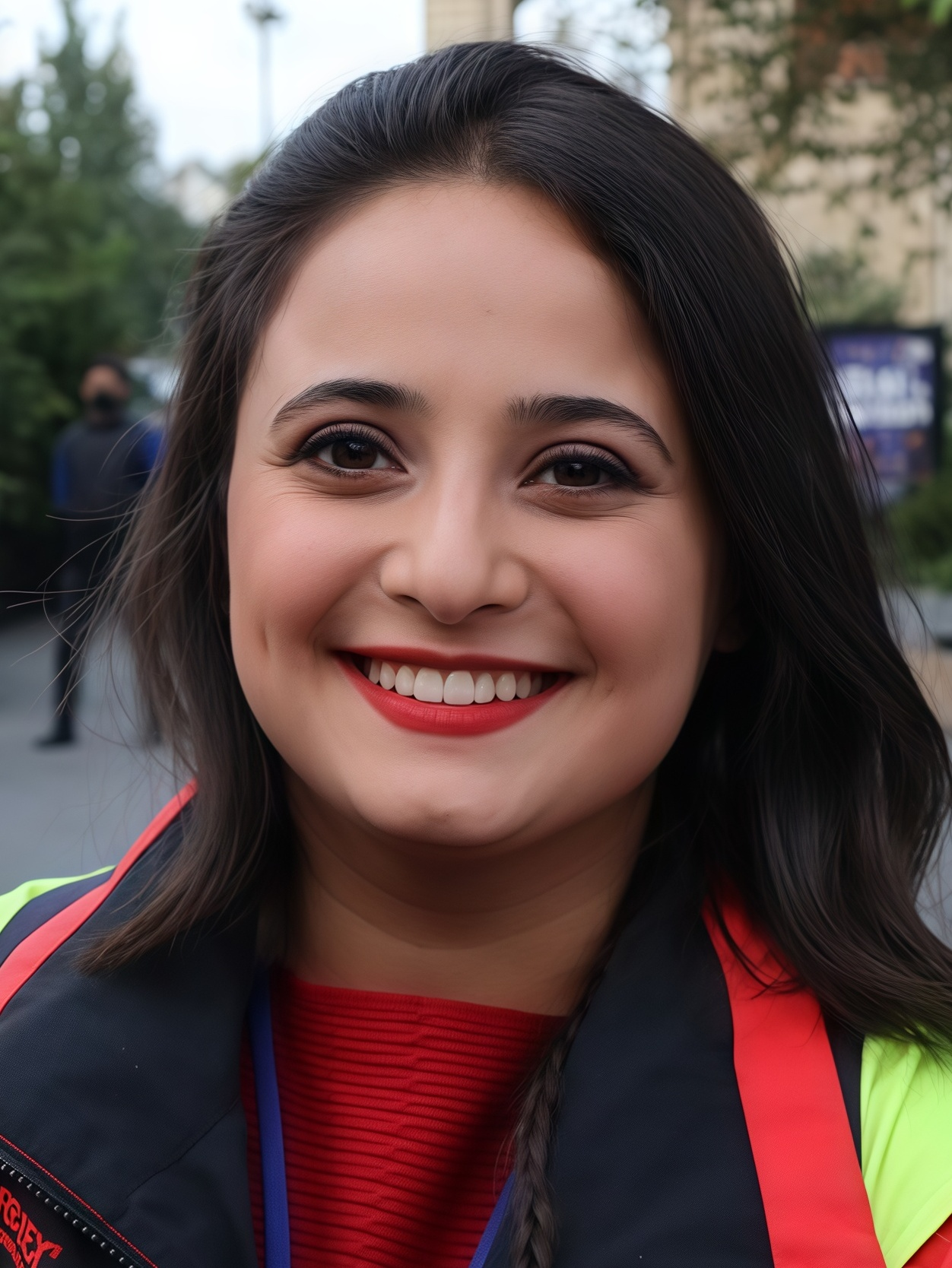
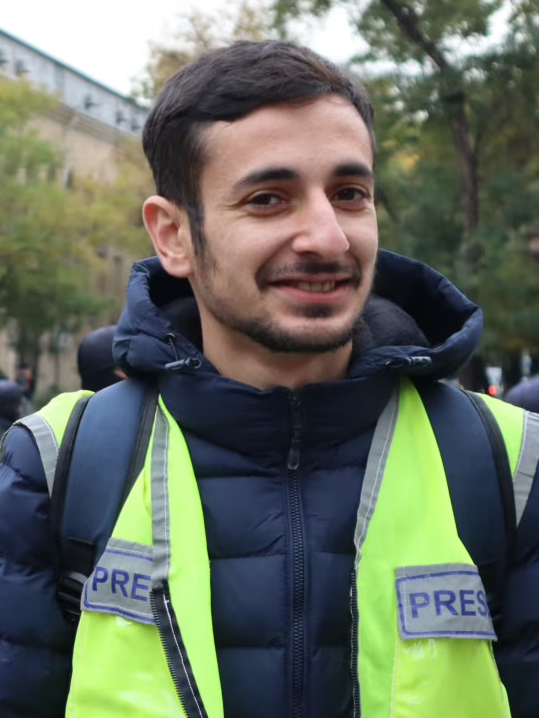
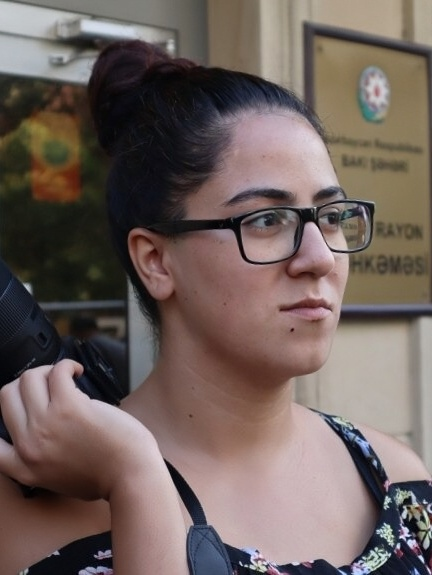
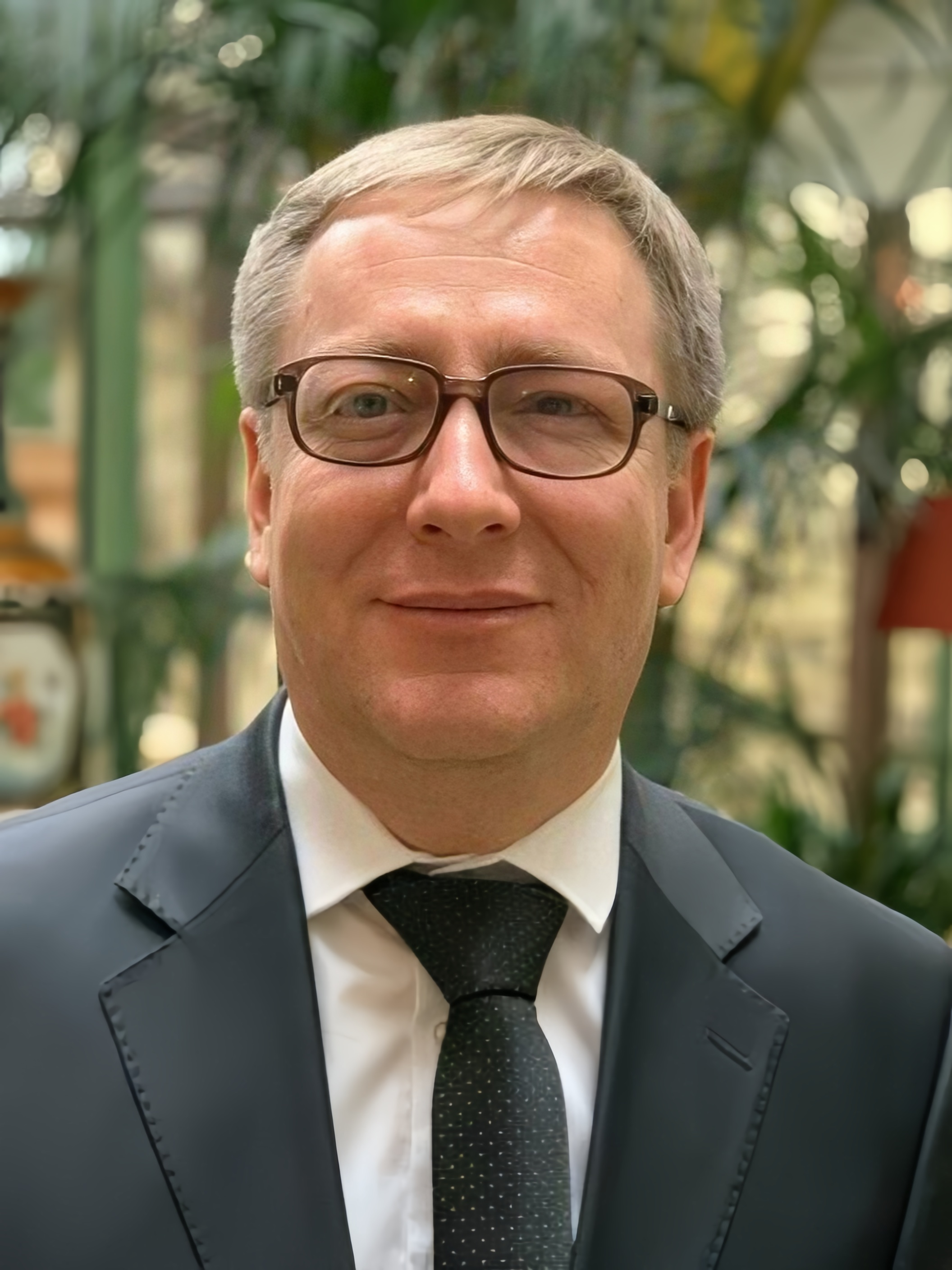
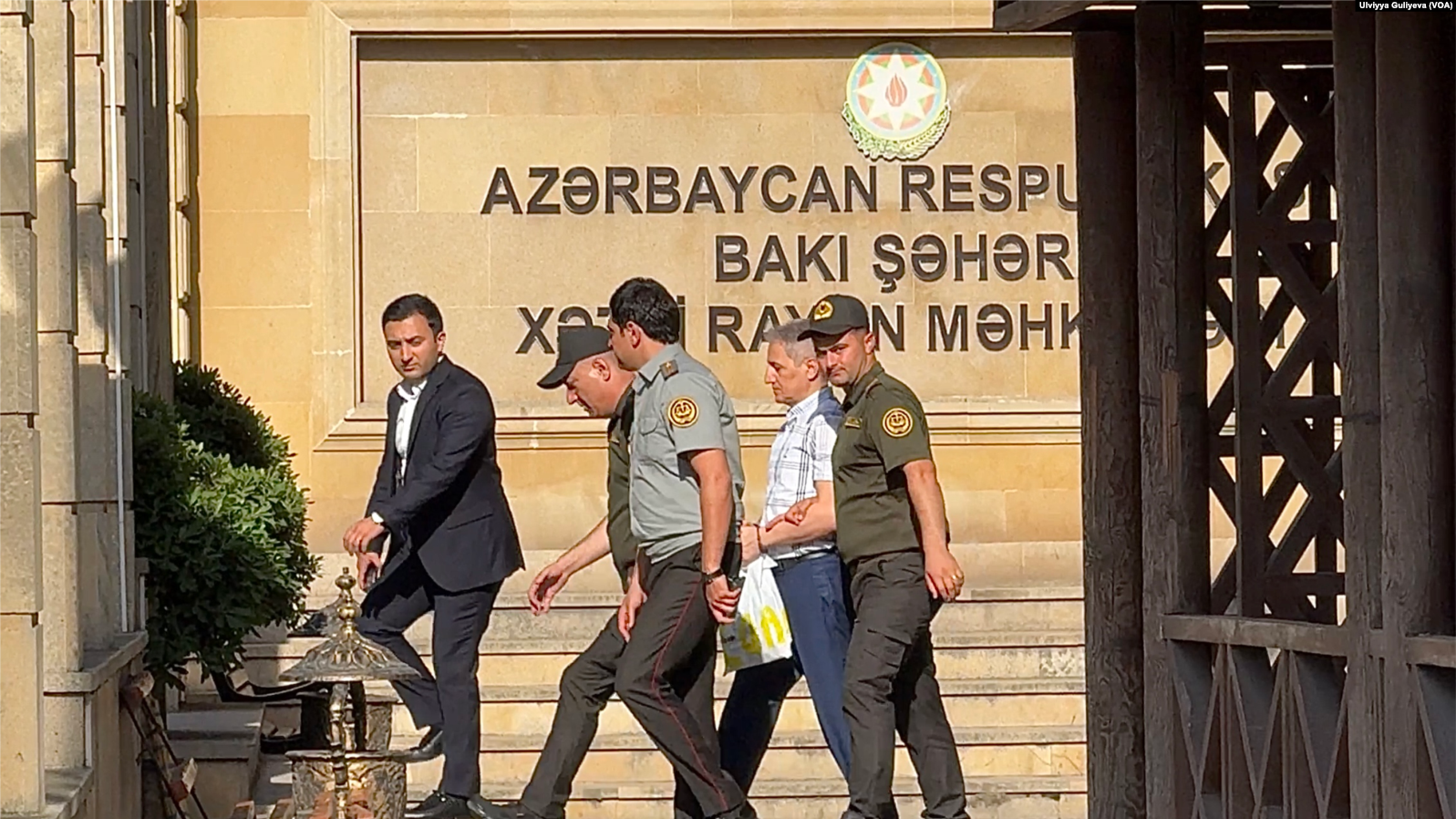
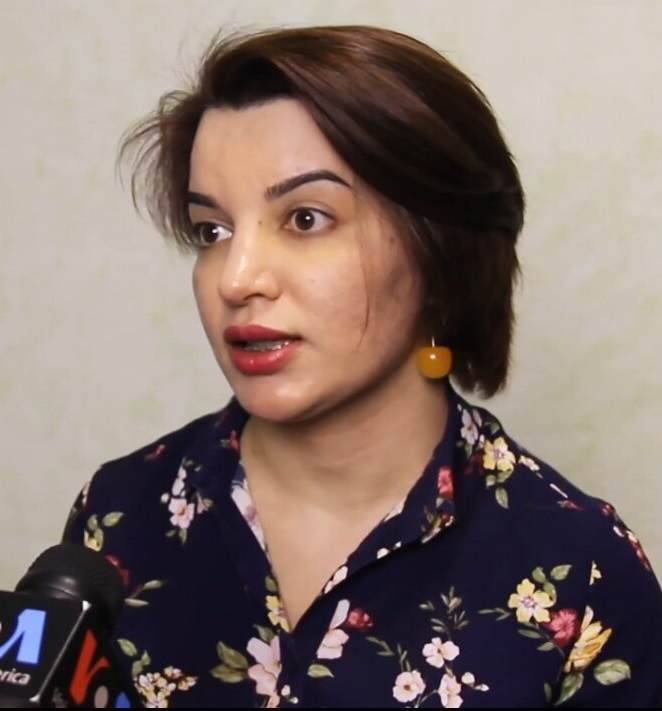
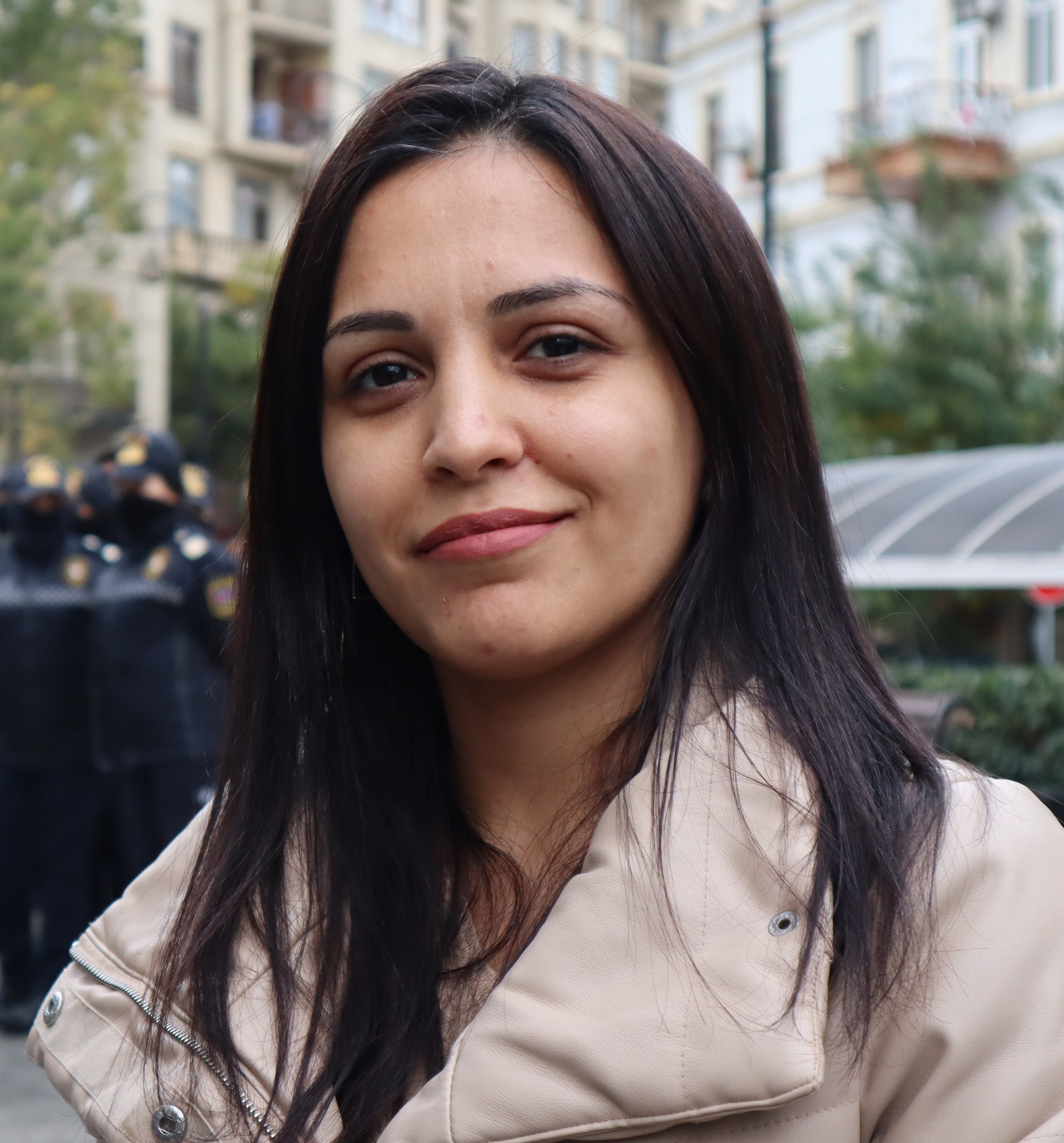
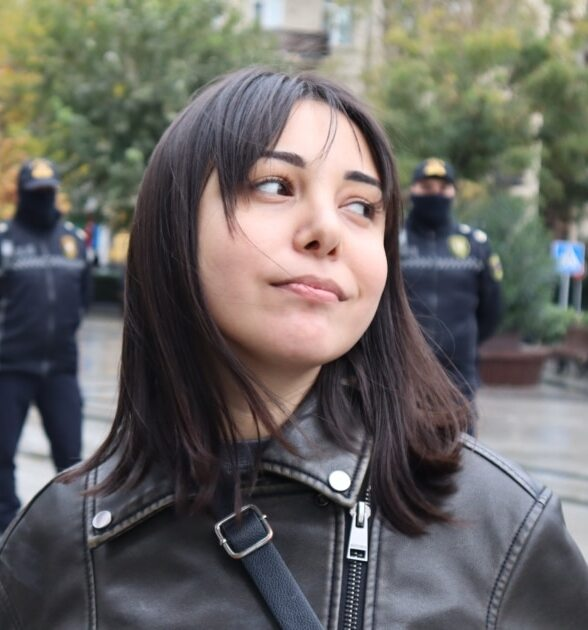
- Ulvi Hasanli is escorted by a police convoy to the Main Department of the Baku City Police following a search of his home (first row); journalists Shamshad Agha, Nargiz Absalamova, Farid Ismayilov, Fatima Movlamli, and Hafiz Babali (second row); Alasgar Mammadli is taken to the Khatai District Court (third row); Sevinj Vagifgizi, Aytaj Tapdig, and Khayala Aghayeva (last row).
- Date: November 20, 2023 – August 28, 2025
- Venue: Azerbaijan
- Cause: • Charges of “smuggling” against the leaders and staff of foreign-funded media outlets (official version) • Elimination of independent Azerbaijani media (presumed version)
- Outcome: • The office of “AbzasMedia” was closed, and its director and staff were arrested • The office of “Toplum TV” was closed, and its staff were arrested • The head of the Baku office of “Meydan TV” and its staff were arrested • The BBC News office in Baku was closed • The Turan Information Agency suspended its activities • The accreditation of correspondents from Voice of America and Bloomberg in Azerbaijan was revoked
- Arrests: 26 people

Serial arrests of journalists in Azerbaijan (2023–2025) occurred from November 2023, targeting independent media outlets in Azerbaijan. Several criminal cases were initiated following a similar pattern.

On November 20, 2023, the head of AbzasMedia, Ulvi Hasanli, and project coordinator Mahammad Kekalov were arrested; on November 21, the editor-in-chief of AbzasMedia, Sevinj Abbasova (Vagifgizi); on November 28, the head of the YouTube channel Kanal13, Aziz Orujov; on November 30, AbzasMedia reporter Nargiz Absalamova; on December 12, the head of the YouTube channel Kanal11, Teymur Karimov; on December 13, the editor of the economic department of the Turan Information Agency, Hafiz Babali; on January 14, 2024, AbzasMedia reporter Elnara Gasimova; on March 6–8, video editor of Toplum TV, Mushfig Jabbarov, and co-founder of Toplum TV, Alasgar Mammadli; on April 18, the head of the website Meclisinfo, Imran Aliyev; on May 30, Radio Free Europe/Radio Liberty employee Farid Mehralizade; on December 6, the editor-in-chief of Meydan TV, Aynur Ganbarova (Elgunesh), reporters Aysel Umudova, Aytaj Ahmadova (Tapdig), Khayala Aghayeva, and Ramin Jabrayilzade (Deko), and journalist Natig Javadli; on January 17, 2025, Toplum TV reporter Farid Ismayilov; on February 6, Meydan TV editor Shamshad Agha and Toplum TV editor Shahnaz Huseynova (Beylargizi); on February 20, independent reporter Nurlan Gahramanli (Libre); on March 1, independent reporter Fatima Movlamli; on May 7, Voice of America journalist Ulviyya Guliyeva (Ali); and on August 28, independent photojournalist Ahmed Mukhtar were arrested.

Criminal proceedings were initiated against the detained media executives under Article 206.3.2 of the Criminal Code of Azerbaijan. Subsequently, other media workers were also implicated in the same case. A preliminary investigation was conducted by the Main Department of the Baku City Police, and as a result, journalists were charged under additional articles of the Criminal Code, including illegal entrepreneurship involving large-scale income committed by an organized group, legalization of property obtained through criminal means on a significant scale, smuggling committed by an organized group, tax evasion committed by an organized group, document forgery, use of forged documents, and employing workers without formal labor contracts.

Between 2023 and 2025, at least 110 individuals were questioned as witnesses by the Investigation Department of the Main Department of the Baku City Police of the Ministry of Internal Affairs in connection with criminal cases against AbzasMedia, Toplum TV, and Meydan TV. Those questioned included not only journalists, but also their family members, friends, landlords of apartments used as offices, and taxi drivers whose services the arrested individuals had used. Most witnesses later retracted their testimonies during court proceedings, stating that they had been pressured to testify.

During the wave of arrests, family members of the detained journalists, as well as civil society activists and journalists, were banned from leaving the country. The State Border Service informed most of them that their departure had been restricted by a decision of the Ministry of Internal Affairs. However, the activists had not been notified of this decision in advance; they only learned about it at the airport while attempting to cross the state border. Human rights defenders and lawyers considered these restrictions unjustified.

The arrests were discussed both domestically and internationally. The President of Azerbaijan, Ilham Aliyev, stated that freedom of speech is guaranteed in the country and that those arrested were detained not for journalistic activity, but for illegal financing. Opposition leaders and civil society activists described these events as a suppression of press freedom. International human rights organizations referred to the detainees as “political prisoners” and called on the Azerbaijani authorities to immediately and unconditionally release them.

== Background ==
According to a report by the organization Reporters Without Borders (RSF), Azerbaijan is among the countries where the state of press freedom is considered critical: President Ilham Aliyev, having eliminated any semblance of pluralism, has been waging an uncompromising campaign against all remaining critics since 2014. According to the organization's report, Azerbaijan ranked 154th in the Press Freedom Index in 2022 and 151st in 2023.

In 2021, a new draft law on media was introduced for discussion in Azerbaijan. The stages of discussion and adoption of the law—consisting of 9 chapters and 78 articles—were condemned by both local and international communities. Representatives of independent media stated that the draft law, which drew widespread criticism, was aimed at controlling online media, which in Azerbaijan are freer than traditional media. Representatives of pro-government media organizations, on the other hand, believe that the law was prepared in order to “adapt the media to modern requirements.” Media expert Alasgar Mammadli emphasized that although around 40 proposals were submitted regarding the new draft law, only two were considered, while all the others were rejected. Among the unconsidered proposals, the “most significant issue” was the matter of a unified licensing system, privileges, and the registration of journalists. Alasgar Mammadli noted that “the structure of the regulatory body, its independence, as well as the issue of preventing the mixing of licensed and unlicensed journalistic activities—these aspects, unfortunately, were not taken into account.” Representatives of media outlets that did not criticize the authorities believed that one of the main problems in the country's media sphere was the activity of random media organizations and journalists in the press, and that the new law would regulate these issues. However, experts stated that online media and independent journalists capable of criticism and highlighting problems are the ones most affected. Natig Mammadli, a representative of the Media Development Agency (MEDIA), stated that claims that the draft law violates international law and poses a threat to freedom of expression are unfounded.

According to Vusala Mahirgizi, head of the pro-government media group Azerbaijani Press Agency, the preparation of the new law “On Media” is a positive development. Mehman Aliyev, head of the Turan Information Agency, believes that MEDIA conducted the preparation of the draft law behind closed doors and concealed the process from independent media representatives. “We demanded that it be submitted to the Turan Information Agency for discussion, but it was not provided to us. Other experts were not given access to it either,” Mehman Aliyev added. According to him, the closed nature of the drafting process is aimed at restricting freedom of speech in Azerbaijan.

In January 2023, 40 journalists signed a position paper regarding the media law, particularly concerning the article on the creation of a unified register, which establishes broad conditions for restricting media freedom and freedom of expression. Among the signatories were well-known figures such as media expert Alasgar Mammadli, head of the Turan Information Agency Mehman Aliyev, editor-in-chief of Toplum TV Khadija Ismayilova, editor-in-chief of Meydan TV Aynur Elgunesh, head of AbzasMedia Ulvi Hasanli and editor-in-chief Sevinj Vagifgizi, editor-in-chief of the newspaper Azadliq (Freedom) Ganimat Zahid and editor Rovshan Hajibeyli, investigative journalist Hafiz Babali, and political journalist Natig Javadli.

== Arrests in November 2023 ==
Starting from November 20, 2023, the team of the Azerbaijani online publication AbzasMedia, known in recent years for its high-profile investigative journalism, faced repression. The outlet's director, Ulvi Hasanli, was detained at night near his home by plainclothes individuals who turned out to be officers of the Main Department of the Baku City Police. Searches were conducted both in his apartment and in the Abzas Media office. According to the police, €40,000 was found on a cabinet in the office corridor.

Ulvi Hasanli stated that he was beaten during his detention. The AbzasMedia team issued a statement saying that Hasanli had been subjected to physical violence during the arrest and held Ilham Aliyev responsible. The journalists of AbzasMedia stated that the detention was connected to Hasanli's journalistic work and that the outlet would continue its activities: “We consider the head of state, Ilham Aliyev, responsible for this unlawful detention. We have published a series of investigations into corruption crimes committed by the country’s president and officials appointed by him, and we believe Hasanli’s detention is directly related to this. We believe the president ordered the arrest of Ulvi Hasanli in order to shut down our outlet and prevent us from informing you about corruption crimes. However, no arrests or other forms of pressure will stop us from telling you the truth,” the statement said.

Ulvi Hasanli и Sevinj Vagifgizi
Nargiz Absalamova и Elnara Gasimova

On the night of November 21, upon returning to the country from a trip abroad, the editor-in-chief of AbzasMedia, Sevinj Abbasova (Vagifgizi), was detained directly on the plane. The journalist was taken to her apartment, where a search was conducted. After a search lasting more than two hours, she was brought to the Main Department of the Baku City Police.

A criminal case was initiated against the leadership of AbzasMedia under Article 206.3.2 of the Criminal Code of Azerbaijan — smuggling committed by a group of persons by prior agreement. By decision of the Khatai District Court, they were placed in pre-trial detention for a period of four months.

On November 22, the Ministry of Internal Affairs of Azerbaijan reported that Mahammad Kekalov had been detained on November 20 as part of the criminal case. His detention became known only three days after he had been taken from his home to an unknown destination. Kekalov was involved in social projects and support for people with disabilities, and at AbzasMedia he only acted as an advisor to the outlet's leadership. On November 23, Kekalov was arrested for three months and 27 days on charges of smuggling. He denied the charges.

On November 30, Interior Minister, Colonel-General Mr. Vilayat Eyvazov, responding to an inquiry from the Committee to Protect Journalists (CPJ), called claims that the charges against AbzasMedia leadership were linked to their professional activities completely unfounded. According to Eyvazov, the three arrested journalists had transported “a large amount of foreign currency” across Azerbaijan's state border “outside customs control or secretly and without declaration,” and that the €40,000 found in the Abzas Media office was “part” of this smuggled currency.

On November 30, AbzasMedia employee Nargiz Absalamova was arrested after being summoned to the Main Department of the Baku City Police as a witness in the outlet's criminal case. She was also charged with currency smuggling. On December 1, 2023, a court ordered her pre-trial detention for three months. The journalist denied the charges and linked the criminal prosecution to her professional activities.

On December 13, 2023, police detained investigative journalist Hafiz Babali, editor of the economic department of the Turan Information Agency, who had published his materials, including in AbzasMedia. Babali was detained within the framework of the case against AbzasMedia staff and was prosecuted alongside them. During a search of his home, a computer, mobile phone, and some documents were seized. Earlier, on November 28, Babali had also been summoned as a witness in the case and his bank accounts had been frozen. In an interview, Babali stated that AbzasMedia's latest investigation into corruption, focusing on the head of Azerbaijan's State Security Service, had become the “last straw” for the authorities before the repression against the outlet.

Among those questioned in November 2023 in the AbzasMedia case was journalist Elnara Gasimova. On January 13, 2024, police again required her to appear for questioning at the Main Department of the Baku City Police, stating that they wanted to clarify issues related to her colleagues’ case. After the interrogation, Elnara Gasimova was detained and charged in the criminal case against AbzasMedia staff. She denied the charges and linked them to her professional activities.

On June 20, 2025, journalists and staff of the online outlet AbzasMedia were found guilty and sentenced to prison terms ranging from 7.5 to 9 years. The outlet's director Ulvi Hasanli, editor-in-chief Sevinj Vagifgizi, investigative journalist Hafiz Babali, and economist Farid Mehralizade were each sentenced to 9 years in prison. Reporters Nargiz Absalamova and Elnara Gasimova were sentenced to 8 years in prison. Project coordinator Mahammad Kekalov was sentenced to 7.5 years. Before the verdict was announced, the journalists rejected the charges and stated that they had been arrested for their professional activities and for investigating corruption.

=== Arrests of the directors of Kanal11 and Kanal13 ===
On November 27, 2023, police conducted a search at the home of Aziz Orujov, director of Kanal13. Later, his lawyer reported that Orujov had been detained on charges of unauthorized construction. Police searches were carried out both in Orujov's apartment and in the Kanal13 office. “The searches were conducted by officers of the Sabail District Police on the grounds that Aziz Orujov had purchased a plot of land in the ‘20th Plot’ settlement many years ago and had illegally built a house there. A search was also conducted in his personal car,” Orujov’s lawyer noted. According to Orujov’s wife, Lamiya Orujova, law enforcement officers seized two of her husband’s laptops, a phone he did not use, and documents related to the journalist’s previous arrest.

Media law expert and member of the Civil Society Platform, Alasgar Mammadli, linked Orujov’s detention to his professional activities. “The head of ‘Kanal-13,’ which has 1,600,000 subscribers on YouTube, was detained as if he were a terrorist. A large number of masked law enforcement officers came to his home. They conducted a search and detained him in front of his young child. Is ‘unauthorized construction’ really such a serious crime that the detention could not have waited until morning, when the person could have been summoned to the police and formally charged? What was the need for a search? He did not buy plantations, but merely a small plot of land. In Baku and its surroundings, there are about 500,000 illegally built houses, and the reason for this ‘illegality’ lies in bureaucracy and corruption. Despite this enormous number of illegal constructions, it is precisely the head of a media structure in Azerbaijan—with the largest number of YouTube subscribers, the longest broadcasting history, and a platform for critical opinions—who is being arrested. The channel has been broadcasting for 15 years. This is an obvious suppression of freedom of expression and freedom in general. Without free media, there can be no free society,” Mammadli said. According to him, Kanal-13 is characterized by pluralism of opinions and has covered cases of human rights violations, protest actions, and court proceedings against critics of the government.

On November 28, 2023, a court placed Orujov under arrest for two months under Article 188.2 (unauthorized construction or installation work on a land plot without legally established ownership, use, or lease rights), which предусматривает a sentence of one to three years of imprisonment. During the hearing, he stated that he was being persecuted for his journalistic work. “In this country, journalism is treated as a crime; if you convey truthful information, you can very easily be thrown into prison,” his lawyer conveyed his words.

On December 2, 2023, Rufat Muradli, a host on Kanal-13, was detained on charges of minor hooliganism and disobeying police orders. The Khatai District Court of Baku sentenced Muradli to 30 days of detention on these charges.

In early December, the Ministry of Internal Affairs of Azerbaijan sent a letter to the Ministry of Digital Development and Transport (RINN) requesting the blocking of Kanal-13, claiming that it disseminates “false information discrediting officials of various state bodies.” On December 11, a court in Baku granted RINN's request to block access to the Kanal-13 online television platform.

On December 19, new charges were brought against Orujov under Article 206.3.2 of the Criminal Code of Azerbaijan (smuggling committed by a group of persons by prior agreement). Orujov declared his innocence. According to his lawyer, the case concerns “a small sum of money that Orujov’s brother, Anar Orujov, sent him from Europe through an acquaintance.” Anar Orujov, a co-founder of Kanal-13, is in political exile in Germany.

On December 27, a Baku court also ordered the pre-trial detention of freelance journalist and Kanal-13 contributor Shamo Eminov for three months. He had been detained on December 22 following a search of his home, during which law enforcement officers also seized his laptop. For several days, his family was not informed of his whereabouts. Rufat Safarov, director of the NGO “Defense Line,” reported that Eminov was subjected to threats and pressure during interrogations and was not provided with a lawyer. Like Aziz Orujov, Shamo Eminov was charged with smuggling foreign currency by prior agreement (Article 206.3.2 of the Criminal Code of Azerbaijan). On January 8, 2024, the Committee to Protect Journalists (CPJ) issued a statement regarding the cases of Aziz Orujov and Shamo Eminov.

In December 2024, a lawyer reported that the smuggling charges against Aziz Orujov had been dropped, and he would stand trial only on the charge of illegal construction. After the smuggling charge was removed from the case, Shamo Eminov was released from custody on December 29, 2024. On February 26, 2025, the Sabail District Court sentenced Orujov to two years of imprisonment. He was released on November 27, 2025, after serving his sentence.

The director of the YouTube project Kanal-11, Teymur Karimov, went missing from contact around midday on December 11, 2023. Journalists from Kanal-11 suggested that he had been detained by law enforcement and would face criminal prosecution related to his work. Karimov also collaborated with media outlets created by Azerbaijani political emigrants in Europe, including Azad Söz (“Free Word”) and Time TV. His colleagues issued a statement noting that Karimov had faced pressure after publishing a critical video report in July 2023 about the head of the executive authority of the Dashkasan District, Ahad Abiyev, on Kanal-11 and Azad Söz. “In particular, a police officer came to his home and stated that a complaint had been filed against him; later, at the police station, it turned out to be a ‘mistake.’ Subsequently, he was repeatedly summoned to the police under various pretexts, and he also received calls demanding that he stop his video reports,” the statement said.

On December 12, it became known that he had indeed been detained “as a suspect based on complaints received from several citizens,” and was accused of extortion through threats, according to a representative of the Azerbaijani Ministry of Internal Affairs. According to Fikret Husaynli, an Azerbaijani opposition figure living in political exile in the Netherlands and head of the YouTube project Time TV, the prosecution of Teymur Karimov “is connected to his journalistic activities.”

On December 12, Karimov was arrested by decision of the Narimanov District Court. On December 28, 2024, the Baku Court for Serious Crimes sentenced Teymur Karimov to 8 years of imprisonment and imposed a 2-year ban on journalistic activity.

== Arrests in March 2024 ==
On March 6, 2024, the Ministry of Internal Affairs conducted an operational search at the office of the Institute of Democratic Initiatives (IDI) and the online channel Toplum TV. It was reported that officers from the Ministry of Internal Affairs forced their way into the office located at 98 Y.V. Chamanzaminli Street in the Narimanov district of the capital, placed everyone present in vehicles, and transported them to the Main Police Department of the city of Baku.

There was no official information regarding the exact number of detainees. According to monitoring by human rights defenders, around 20 individuals who had been in the office were taken to the police station without notifying their relatives or lawyers.

1. Alasgar Mammadli (founder of Toplum TV) (detained on March 8)
2. Mushfig Jabbarov (video editor at Toplum TV)
3. Parvana Gurbanli (editor at Toplum TV)
4. Farid Ismayilov (video reporter at Toplum TV)
5. Jamila Azimova (video reporter at Toplum TV)
6. Fidan Alijanova (video reporter at Toplum TV)
7. Gulyetar Mahmudova (video reporter at Toplum TV)
8. Taleh Badalov (video reporter at Toplum TV)
9. Alya Aghayeva (presenter at Toplum TV)
10. Javid Ramazanov (presenter at Toplum TV)
11. Elmir Abbasov (SMM specialist at Toplum TV)
12. Jeyhuna Hasanli (graphic designer at Toplum TV)
13. Akif Gurbanov (head of the Institute of Democratic Initiatives – IDI)
14. Ali Zeynalov (IDI staff member)
15. Ilkin Amrahov (IDI staff member)
16. Ramil Babayev (IDI staff member)
17. Araz Aliyev (member of Resplatforma)
18. Ruslan Izzatli (member of Resplatforma)

Toplum TV is an independent online platform that provides a space for expressing opinions on socio-political and socio-economic developments. Over the past two years, the project has been led by investigative journalist Khadija Ismayilova. She described the search and detentions as evidence of the Azerbaijani authorities’ intention to eliminate independent media. During the presidential elections in February 2024, journalists from Toplum TV reported on violations and alleged electoral fraud.

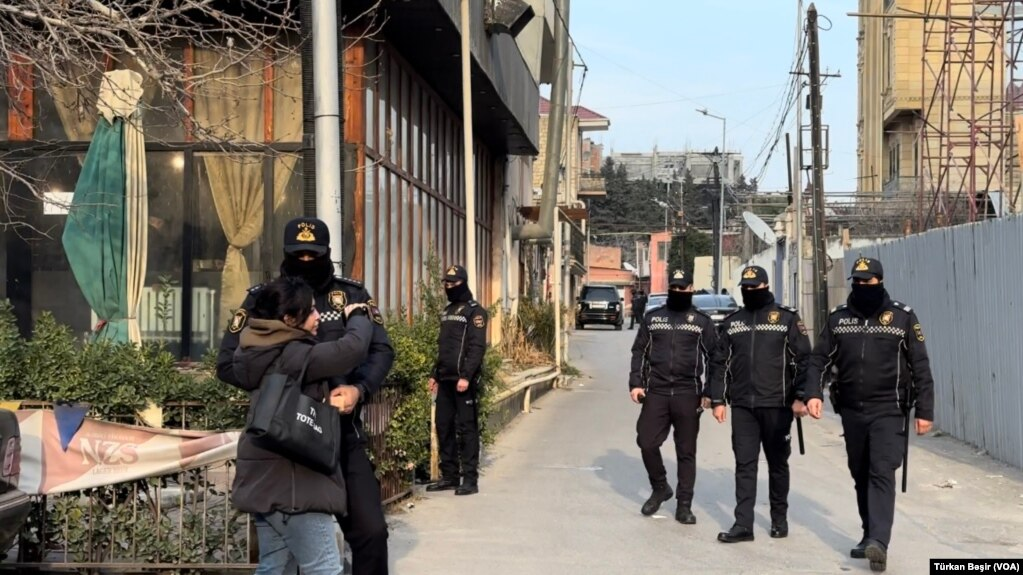
On March 6, a police cordon was set up in front of the office of the online channel Toplum TV.

Three Toplum TV employees—Farid Ismayilov, Elmir Abbasov, and Mushfig Jabbarov—were detained in connection with a smuggling case. On March 8, in Baku, the founder of Toplum TV, Alasgar Mammadli, was also detained as a suspect in currency smuggling. During a search, law enforcement officers reportedly found and seized €7,300 from him, while his lawyer was not allowed to enter the apartment. Family members stated that the money did not belong to Mammadli and had been planted by the authorities themselves. Alasgar Mammadli rejected the accusations, saying that the money had been planted on him. By court decision, Mammadli and Jabbarov were placed under arrest. Farid Ismayilov was released under supervision for the duration of the investigation.

The Ministry of Internal Affairs reported that large sums of money were discovered during searches of the Toplum TV office and other locations. Toplum TV officially stated that only the money found in their office belonged to them. The 8,120 manats discovered in the Toplum TV office were not disputed, and it was reported that these funds were employees’ salaries. However, the €7,300 found in the apartment of Toplum TV co-founder Alasgar Mammadli, €2,000 found in the home of employee Mushfig Jabbarov, €3,100 found in the home of Farid Ismayilov, and €2,700 found in the home of Elmir Abbasov were denied by them and their lawyers. Additionally, within the framework of this criminal case, €31,000 was reportedly found in the office of Akif Gurbanov, head of the Institute of Democratic Initiatives (IDI) and another co-founder of Toplum TV; €2,300 in the home of IDI employee Ramil Babayev; €2,700 in the home of Ilkin Amrahov; €10,150 and $9,060 in the home of Ali Zeynalov; and €4,700 in the home of Ruslan Izzatli. Each of them denied these claims, stating that the money did not belong to them.

Immediately after the arrests, in March 2024, the Committee to Protect Journalists (CPJ) called on the Azerbaijani authorities to release the journalists of Toplum TV, drop all charges against the staff of the independent news organization, and create conditions for the free operation of the media. Reporters Without Borders (RSF) condemned the persecution of independent media in Azerbaijan and the “countless” arrests of journalists.

On January 17 at noon, Farid Ismayilov was detained by police in his apartment and taken to the Main Police Department of the city of Baku. A motion was prepared to отменить the preventive measure of placing him under police supervision and to replace it with pre-trial detention. On the same day, by a decision of Judge Sulhana Hajiyeva of the Khatai District Court, Farid Ismayilov was placed in pre-trial detention for 2 months and 20 days.

On January 22, Farid Ismayilov's lawyer, Zibeyda Sadigova, met with him at the Baku pre-trial detention center. “Farid Ismayilov stated that the reason for choosing pre-trial detention as a preventive measure against him was his journalistic activity during the investigation period. In court, the prosecution claimed that Ismayilov had allegedly visited certain regions of Azerbaijan in July–August and failed to inform the investigation. This does not correspond to reality at all. First, Ismayilov did not visit the mentioned regions; he visited other regions and informed the investigation about this. If the prosecution is using this as a pretext, why did it not provide an explanation for choosing pre-trial detention as a preventive measure against Ismayilov in July–August? Second, no information was provided indicating that Farid Ismayilov’s presence in any region hindered the investigation. He did not evade the investigation,” Sadigova noted. On January 22, the Committee to Protect Journalists (CPJ) issued a statement condemning the arrest of Farid Ismayilov.

The preliminary investigation into the criminal case was completed on January 22. Within the framework of the criminal case conducted by the Main Police Department of the city of Baku, new charges were brought against them under Articles 162–1.1 (engaging workers in any work without concluding an employment contract), 192.3.2 (illegal entrepreneurship, especially involving large income), 193–1.3.1 (legalization of property obtained through criminal means), 193–1.3.2 (...committed in large amounts), 206.4 (smuggling by an organized group), and 213.2.1 (tax evasion committed by an organized group) of the Criminal Code.

== Arrest of Farid Mehralizade in May 2024 ==
Economist and Radio Free Europe/Radio Liberty contributor Farid Mehralizade was detained on May 30, 2024. In a detailed account of his detention, he stated that at around 8:30 a.m., as he was leaving his home for work, unidentified individuals ordered him to “stop,” after which others forcibly pushed him into a car, placing a bag over his head. Inside the vehicle, he was handcuffed and his phone was taken away. He was then taken to the Main Police Department of the city of Baku. After an initial interrogation, a search was conducted at his apartment. Following the search, he was returned to the Main Police Department and declared a suspect.

On June 1, by a decision of Judge Rafael Sadikhov of the Khatai District Court, he was placed in pre-trial detention for 3 months and 20 days. Mehralizade was arrested as part of a criminal case initiated against the leadership and journalists of AbzasMedia. In an official statement, he and his lawyers, as well as AbzasMedia, denied any cooperation between him and the outlet. On June 6, the Baku Court of Appeal rejected his complaint against the pre-trial detention measure.

On June 25, 2024, a group of economists appealed to the authorities to place their colleague Farid Mehralizade under house arrest for the duration of the investigation. The petition was signed by Professor Rasim Hasanov of the Azerbaijan State University of Economics (UNEC), Professor Ingilab Ahmadov of Khazar University, Chairman of the Public Association for Support of Economic Initiatives Azer Mehdiyev, the organization's deputy head Rovshan Aghayev, head of the Entrepreneurship and Market Economy Development Support Fund Sabit Bagihrov, and economic experts Elchin Rashid, Togrul Valiyev, Khatai Aliyev, and Rashad Hasanov.

On September 10, 2024, Senator Ben Cardin called on Ilham Aliyev to release Farid Mehralizade. On November 7, 2024, the Committee to Protect Journalists (CPJ) urged the Azerbaijani authorities to release Mehralizade, stating that his case is a clear example of persecution of regime critics. On October 30, 2024, Radio Free Europe/Radio Liberty President Steve Capus also called for his release.

On June 20, 2025, the Baku Serious Crimes Court sentenced him to 9 years of imprisonment.

== Arrests in February 2025 ==
On February 5, 2025, at around 18:00, journalist Shahnaz Huseynova (Beylargyzy) was detained in connection with a new criminal case on currency smuggling, separated into a distinct proceeding from the Toplum TV case. A search was conducted at her home. According to her relatives, she required medical assistance while in police custody. In recent years, Huseynova had worked as an editor and presenter at Toplum TV, and on March 6, 2024, she had previously been detained by law enforcement during a search at the outlet's office but was later released. On February 6, 2025, the Khatai District Court of Baku ordered the arrest of Shahnaz Beylargyzy. According to her lawyer, she was charged with “the same accusations as the journalists and activists previously arrested in the Toplum TV case.”

On the night of February 5, 2025, Shamshad Agha, head of the news website arqument.az, was detained. A search was conducted at his home, and a computer, mobile phones, and memory cards were confiscated. According to his lawyer, Shahla Humbatova, Agha was detained as a suspect in the Meydan TV case and charged under Article 206.3.2 (smuggling committed by a group of persons by prior conspiracy) of the Criminal Code of Azerbaijan. Agha denies the charges. Shamshad Agha was arrested by a decision of Judge Rafael Sadykhov of the Khatai District Court of Baku. According to lawyer Shahla Humbatova, no initial evidence of Shamshad Agha's involvement in this criminal case was presented to the court. Neither the judge nor the representative of the investigative body was able to answer numerous questions from the court regarding the reasons for Agha's arrest.

On February 8, 2025, members of the “Monitoring Group of Human Rights Organizations of Azerbaijan” — Novella Jafaroghlu, Saida Gojamanli, and Saadat Bananyarli — appealed to the President of Azerbaijan to intervene on behalf of Shahnaz Beylargyzy and “support the journalist’s release under house arrest.” The authors of the appeal pointed out that she suffers from a number of serious illnesses, including diabetes and heart disease. Although the journalist is being held under medical supervision in the medical unit of the Baku pre-trial detention center, the facility's capabilities are limited for treating a person with such complex conditions. They also noted that Beylargyzy has two minor children. The Committee to Protect Journalists (CPJ) called on the Azerbaijani authorities to immediately release Shahnaz Beylargyzy. “The arrest of experienced journalist Shahnaz Beylargyzy highlights how Azerbaijani authorities use allegations of Western funding to silence leading independent voices,” the organization's website quoted Gulnoza Said, CPJ's Europe and Central Asia program coordinator, as saying. She emphasized that Beylargyzy suffers from acute health problems and that every day she unjustly spends behind bars puts her life at risk.

On February 26, the Khatai District Court considered the defense's motion to release journalist Shahnaz Beylargyzy under house arrest. The court granted the motion and ordered her release under house arrest.

At noon on February 20, 2025, Nurlan Gahramanli (Libre) was detained by police officers. Since December 2024, Nurlan Libre had been cooperating with Meydan TV as a freelance correspondent. The press service of the Ministry of Internal Affairs reported that he was detained as a suspect in a criminal case initiated against journalists of Meydan TV. During a search at his mother's home in Sumgait, money and valuables belonging to the family were seized. On February 21, the Khatai District Court chose pretrial detention as a preventive measure against Nurlan Libre.

On February 28, 2025, at around 13:00, Fatima Movlamli was forcibly detained by individuals in plain clothes near the “Azadliq Avenue” metro station. Since December 2024, she had been cooperating with Meydan TV as a freelance correspondent. A search was then conducted at her home in the Binagadi settlement. According to the official record, €13,500 in cash was allegedly found in her apartment. Fatima Movlamli stated that the money did not belong to her and had been planted by the investigator, police captain Nahid Abbasli, who led the search. She also stated that her arrest was related to her journalistic activities. The Ministry of Internal Affairs reported that Fatima Movlamli was detained as a suspect in criminal case No. 240200039 (the “Meydan TV” case), the preliminary investigation of which is being conducted by the Main Police Department of Baku. On March 1, 2025, by decision of Judge Sahiba Hajiyeva of the Khatai District Court, pretrial detention was chosen as a preventive measure against Fatima Movlamli.

== Suspension of the Turan Information Agency and closure of foreign media offices in February 2025 ==
On February 13, amid pressure on the media, the last remaining independent media outlet in the country, the Turan Information Agency, announced the suspension of its activities. The agency's director, Mehman Aliyev, issued a statement on behalf of the staff, saying that the Turan Information Agency was suspending its operations in its current format due to financial difficulties.

On February 20, 2025, the Azerbaijani government ordered the cessation of BBC News Azerbaijan’s operations in Baku. In a statement dated February 20, the BBC said it had “reluctantly” decided to close its office in the country after receiving verbal instructions from Azerbaijan's Ministry of Foreign Affairs. A BBC spokesperson commented on the government's decision: “We deeply regret this restrictive step against press freedom.” The BBC stated that this decision would hinder its ability to cover events in and from Azerbaijan. The Azerbaijani Ministry of Foreign Affairs did not respond to the BBC's request for comment on the government's decision. On February 24, the BBC's office in Azerbaijan was closed.

On February 24, the office of “Rossiya Segodnya” (Sputnik) in Azerbaijan was closed, and the accreditation of a Voice of America correspondent was revoked. This was reported by Aykhan Hajizada, spokesperson for the Azerbaijani Ministry of Foreign Affairs.

On February 27, 2025, the pro-government news agency “Report” announced the revocation of Bloomberg’s correspondent accreditation in Azerbaijan.

== Arrest of Ulviyya Ali in May 2025 ==
During the night of May 6 to 7, 2025, around 4:00 AM, information spread across social media about Ulviyya Ali’s detention in connection with the Meydan TV case and a search of her apartment. According to her mother, Ilhama Guliyeva, Ulviyya was subjected to physical abuse and her home was ransacked during the search: “My daughter has an adenoma in her head, and a police officer hit her on the head. They stormed into her house, completely wrecked the apartment. The police confiscated her personal belongings, took her computer, and ‘found’ over 6,000 euros in cash.” On May 7, Ulviyya Ali was formally charged under Article 206.3.2 of Azerbaijan’s Criminal Code (smuggling committed by a group of persons by prior agreement). Judge Sulhana Gadjieva of the Khatai District Court imposed a pretrial detention measure of 1 month and 29 days. When Ulviyya Ali was brought to court, she again raised her handcuffed wrists and proclaimed: “The hands of the media are shackled!” According to her lawyer, Elvin Alyamov, during the search of her apartment, police claimed to have discovered 6,000 euros. However, Ulviyya Ali insisted that the money did not belong to her and had been planted by the police. She also reported being subjected to mistreatment during her detention: “At the police station, they demanded her phone password, and when she refused, they struck her on the head multiple times,” Alyamov said. In a comment to DOXA, women's rights advocate Gulnara Mehdiyeva stated that Ulviyya Ali was beaten for several hours by security officers after her arrest. “Multiple blows to the head, two female officers pulled her by the hair, and one officer said: ‘I will destroy your womanhood’ — which can be regarded as a threat of sexual violence,” Mehdiyeva reported.

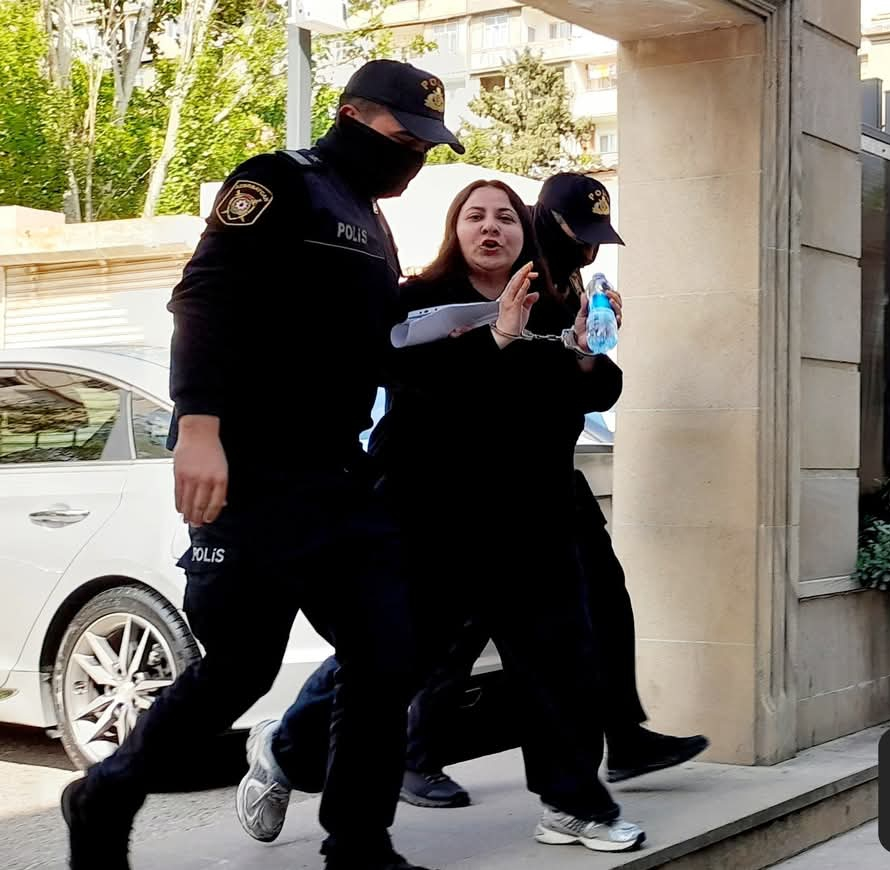
When Ulviyya Ali was brought to court, she raised her handcuffed wrists and loudly declared: "The hands of the media are shackled!"

On May 10, reports emerged indicating that Ulviyya Ali was in poor condition in the pretrial detention center. After being subjected to violence by police at the Baku City Police Department, during which she sustained multiple blows to the head, Ali reportedly vomited twice while held in the temporary detention facility of the Khatai District Police Department, and once in the Baku pretrial detention center. It was reported that since 2017, she had a tumor (adenoma) in her head. Ulviyya Ali filed a complaint with the Republican Prosecutor's Office regarding the police violence. She also requested a comprehensive medical examination, including an MRI scan, to determine whether she had sustained internal injuries that would require her transfer to a facility equipped with the necessary medical equipment and staff. However, none of her requests were fulfilled.

A number of local and international human rights organizations condemned the arrest of Ulviyya Ali, calling it political, and urged the Azerbaijani authorities to release her immediately. On May 8, the International Federation of Journalists (IFJ) and the European Federation of Journalists (EFJ) issued a joint statement condemning her arrest as politically motivated and called on the Azerbaijani authorities to release her immediately. The Human Rights House Foundation (HRHF) also strongly condemned the detention and mistreatment of Ulviyya Ali, expressed solidarity, and demanded her immediate and unconditional release. The committee to Protect Journalists (CPJ) called Ulviyya Ali's arrest "a step by the Azerbaijani authorities to eliminate any trace of independent journalism," urging her immediate release and a prompt investigation into disturbing allegations of police abuse. The International Freedom of Expression Exchange (IFEX) joined local and international organizations in calling for the immediate release of Ulviyya Ali and all other imprisoned journalists in Azerbaijan. IFEX condemned the use of physical violence, smear campaigns, and politically motivated charges as tools of intimidation and media repression. The Council of Europe's Media Freedom and the NGO Freedom Now expressed concern over Ulviyya Ali's arrest and the rising number of detained independent journalists in Azerbaijan. The International Women's Media Foundation (IWMF) emphasized that "reporting on injustice is not a crime" and also called for Ulviyya Ali's release.

According to human rights defender Emin Huseynov, following the expulsion of AbzasMedia and Toplum TV from the country and the closure of Turan Information Agency, Ulviyya Ali became the only remaining source of independent journalism in Azerbaijan. According to journalist Arzu Geybullayeva, Ulviyya Ali was targeted because she was one of the few remaining reporters still working in the country. On May 16, a member United States House of Representatives Jamie Raskin, expressed his solidarity with Ulviyya Ali on his official X microblog, voicing his support for all journalists like her who are resisting authoritarian regimes, dictators, kleptocrats, and the censorship of police states.

== List of the accused ==
Full list of journalists and media representatives arrested in 2023–2025
#	Date of arrest	Journalist	Media outlet	Sentence	Released
1	20 November 2023	Ulvi Hasanli	director of AbzasMedia	9 years of imprisonment	
2	20 November 2023	Mahammad Kekalov	project coordinator of AbzasMedia	7.5 years of imprisonment	
3	21 November 2023	Sevinj Abbasova (Vagifgizi)	editor-in-chief of AbzasMedia	9 years of imprisonment	
4	28 November 2023	Aziz Orujov	director of the YouTube channel Kanal13	2 years of imprisonment	28 November 2025
5	30 November 2023	Nargiz Absalamova	reporter at AbzasMedia	8 years of imprisonment	
6	12 December 2023	Teymur Karimov	director of the YouTube channel Kanal11	8 years of imprisonment	
7	13 December 2023	Hafiz Babali	journalist at the Turan Information Agency	9 years of imprisonment	
8	14 January 2024	Elnara Gasimova	reporter at AbzasMedia	8 years of imprisonment	
9	6 March 2024	Mushfig Jabbarov	Toplum TV video editor		
10	6 March 2024	Elmir Abbasov	SMM, "Toplum TV"	12 years of imprisonment	8 March 2024
10	27 July 2026	Elmir Abbasov	SMM, "Toplum TV"	12 years of imprisonment	
11	8 March 2024	Alasgar Mammadli	co-founder of Toplum TV		
12	18 April 2024	Imran Aliyev	head of the website "Məclisinfo"		
13	30 May 2024	Farid Mehralizade	Radio Free Europe/Radio Liberty journalist	9 years of imprisonment	
14	6 December 2024	Aynur Ganbarova (Elgunesh)	Editor-in-Chief of Meydan TV		
15	6 December 2024	Aysel Umudova	Meydan TV reporter		
16	6 December 2024	Aytaj Ahmadova (Tapdig)	Meydan TV reporter		
17	6 December 2024	Khayala Aghayeva	Meydan TV reporter		
18	6 December 2024	Natig Javadli	journalist of Meydan TV		
19	6 December 2024	Ramin Jabrayilzade (Deko)	Meydan TV reporter		
20	17 January 2025	Farid Ismayilov	reporter at Toplum TV		
21	6 February 2025	Shahnaz Huseynova (Beylargizi)	editor of "Toplum TV"		26 February 2025
22	6 February 2025	Shamshad Agha	editor of "Meydan TV"		
23	20 February 2025	Nurlan Gahramanli (Libre)	freelance reporter		
24	28 February 2025	Fatima Movlamli	freelance reporter		
25	7 May 2025	Ulviyya Guliyeva (Ali)	Voice of America journalist		
26	28 August 2025	Ahmed Mukhtar	independent photojournalist		

== Searches of apartments ==
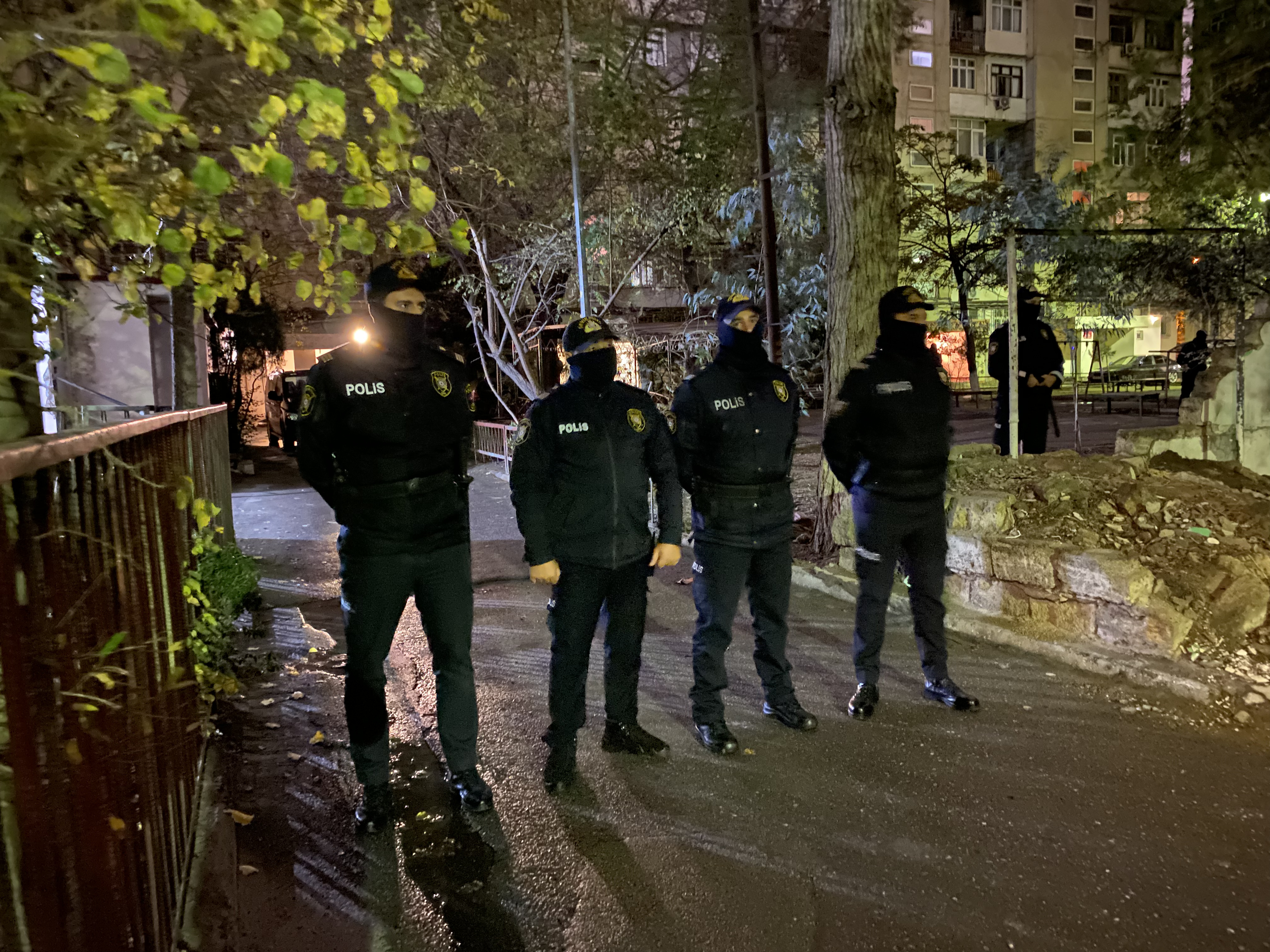
Police in front of Sevinj Vagifgizi's house during a search of her apartment.

In total, more than 20 searches were conducted under three criminal cases related to smuggling. In most of the searches carried out by the Main Police Department of the city of Baku, lawyers were not present.

In November 2023, during a search of the AbzasMedia office, 40,000 euros were allegedly found. The director of AbzasMedia, Ulvi Hasanli, and his lawyer Zibeyda Sadigova denied this claim, stating that the money had been planted by the police.

A similar situation occurred during searches of the Toplum TV office and other locations on March 6–8, 2024. The 8,120 manats found in the Toplum TV office were not disputed and were reported to be employees’ salaries. However, 7,300 euros allegedly found in the apartment of Toplum TV co-founder Alasgar Mammadli, 2,000 euros found in the home of employee Mushfig Jabbarov, 3,100 euros found in the home of Farid Ismayilov, and 2,700 euros found in the home of Elmir Abbasov were denied by them and their lawyers. Additionally, within the framework of the same criminal case, 31,000 euros were allegedly found in the office of Akif Gurbanov, head of the Institute for Democratic Initiatives (IDI) and another co-founder of Toplum TV; 2,300 euros in the home of IDI employee Ramil Babayev; 2,700 euros in the home of Ilkin Amrahov; 10,150 euros and 9,060 US dollars in the home of Ali Zeynalov; and 4,700 euros in the home of Ruslan Izzatli. All of them denied these claims, stating that the money did not belong to them.

However, the arrests in December 2024 presented a somewhat different picture. Ramin Deko stated that he had 8,000 euros in his bag. However, when he was forcibly pulled out of a taxi, plainclothes individuals allegedly placed an additional 30,000 euros into his travel bag. According to the decision of the Board of Directors of the Central Bank of the Republic of Azerbaijan dated March 3, 2016, and in accordance with paragraph 2 of the Rules on the import and export of foreign currency and foreign currency-denominated securities by residents and non-residents to and from the Republic of Azerbaijan, individuals and legal entities may bring into the country up to 10,000 US dollars (or equivalent) in cash foreign currency by declaring it orally to customs authorities. In this case, Ramin Deko was permitted to bring 8,000 euros into the country. According to his lawyer Nemat Karimli, Ramin Deko was subjected to severe violence, and an additional 30,000 euros were planted in his bag to create the appearance of illegality. The 300 euros seized from the home of Aytaj Tapdig represented compensation paid to him by the Azerbaijani government in accordance with a decision of the European Court of Human Rights (ECHR). Since Nurlan Libre did not have her own apartment, a search was conducted at her parents’ home, where 6,650 manats belonging to her family were seized. The 13,500 euros found in the home of Fatima Movlamli and the 6,700 euros found in the home of Ulviyya Ali were also denied.

Additionally, 15,050 British pounds, 14,100 euros, and 1,200 US dollars were found in the home of Ulvi Tahirov, deputy director of the Baku School of Journalism. During a court hearing held on March 13, 2026, Ulvi Tahirov testified: “After arriving at our home, the police first began to inspect the rooms. I asked them, ‘What are you looking for?’ They replied, ‘We are looking for money.’ I said, ‘Let me show you where the money is,’ and led them to the room. In my suitcase there were 15,000 pounds, 13,000 euros, 1,200 dollars, and some Azerbaijani manats. The 15,000 British pounds were funds allocated by the British Embassy in Azerbaijan to my wife, Rena Tahirova, for a grant project under an official contract.”

== Mass discreditation ==
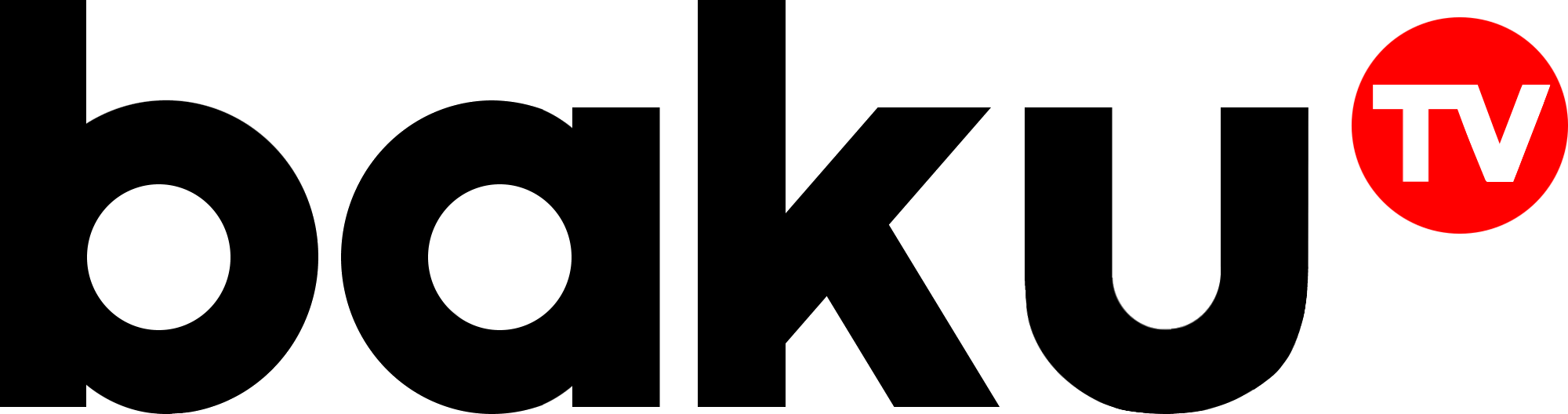
On the evening of December 8, the same day that journalists from Meydan TV were arrested, the pro-government Baku TV illegally broadcast investigative materials, documents, audio recordings, and personal photographs of the detainees.

During the wave of arrests, pro-government media launched open smear campaigns against AbzasMedia, Toplum TV, and Meydan TV. According to human rights activist Arzu Geybullayeva, Azerbaijani pro-government media are well aware of how to conduct targeted campaigns to damage the reputation of specific individuals and organizations. Even before the arrests, journalists from AbzasMedia and Toplum TV were attacked by pro-government news sites claiming that Toplum TV, AbzasMedia, and others were funded by Western governments, particularly the United States, to spread anti-Azerbaijani narratives. “Therefore, it is not surprising that after the arrests of journalists, a wave of ‘investigations’ appeared about Meydan TV, echoing the official version. It was alleged that Meydan TV journalists were involved in ‘money laundering’ and ‘suspicious activities’,” Geybullayeva noted.

Authors of the fact-checking platform Fakt Yoxla analyzed these targeted smear campaigns and concluded that the content of the disseminated materials undermines the presumption of innocence of the arrested journalists and violates their rights to privacy and family life. “These materials contain accusations against the imprisoned journalists, such as ‘smuggling,’ ‘participation in money laundering,’ as well as personal correspondence obtained from the journalists’ devices who were not involved in the criminal investigation, including WhatsApp voice recordings, Slack communications, and information about relatives and personal life.”

On June 1, 2025, the pro-government Baku TV aired a video accusing Ulviyya Ali of “smuggling” and “subversive activities.” The Institute for Reporters’ Freedom and Safety (IRFS), which defends freedom of speech and media, issued a statement regarding this. The IRFS statement read: “Journalist Ulviya Ali (Guliyeva) has become the target of a smear campaign. The façade of a ‘criminal investigation’ is built on fabricated evidence and outright lies, while her torture, threats of sexual violence, and ongoing suffering are hidden behind official theses. For the international human rights community, it is extremely important to study this propaganda in detail.”

== Sexual harassment against Aysel Umudova ==
The last journalist to be arrested during the wave of detentions on December 6 was Aysel Umudova. In a detailed article about her detention, Umudova recounted that on the morning of December 6, she went to the recreational center Galaalty in Shabran. “As soon as I arrived at the Galaalty hotel and entered my room, I turned on my phone, which had been off. As soon as I switched it on, friends called me and told me that journalists from Meydan TV had been abducted. Immediately upon receiving this news, I began preparing to return to Baku. Suddenly, the door of the room I was staying in was broken open from the outside, and six plainclothes police officers entered. My phone was immediately confiscated. They grabbed my hands and restrained my movements, put me in a car, and drove me to Baku,” Umudova recalled. Umudova further described sexual harassment during the transport: “We were halfway when I began having a panic attack. It became difficult to breathe, my head felt heavy, my wrists went numb, and I experienced uncontrollable tingling in my hands and lips. After some time, I realized my condition was worsening and asked for water. There was no water in the car either. The person sitting to my left tried to provide medical assistance. He massaged my wrist to stabilize my condition. When I felt the hand that had been on my wrist touch my leg, I thought he had made inappropriate contact. I quickly pulled his hand away from my leg. Then, when he again placed his hand on my knee and touched my leg, I swiftly removed it and put it in my pocket. Realizing I had understood what was happening, he moved to the other end of the seat.”

On February 6, 2026, a number of international human rights organizations condemned the sexual harassment against Aysel Umudova and called on the government to investigate the cases. Organizations signing the petition included Amnesty International, Human Rights House Foundation, the International Federation for Human Rights (FIDH), the World Organisation Against Torture (OMCT), the Independent Lawyers Network, Article 19 Europe, the Campaign to End Repression in Azerbaijan, the Cupidae Legum Initiative, and the International Human Rights Cooperation. The authors of the petition referred to Article 40 of the Istanbul Convention of the Council of Europe, which states that unwanted physical contact constitutes sexual harassment. “The case of Aysel Umudova reflects a deeply troubling trend in the broader context of politically motivated persecution in Azerbaijan. In this context, pre-trial detention and sexual violence appear to have been used as tools to intimidate, silence, and punish human rights defenders and independent female journalists,” the statement said.

== Witness testimonies ==
Between 2023 and 2025, at least 110 individuals were questioned as witnesses by the Investigation Department of the Main Department of the Baku City Police of the Ministry of Internal Affairs in connection with criminal cases against AbzasMedia, Toplum TV, and Meydan TV. Those questioned included not only journalists, but also their family members, friends, landlords of apartments used as offices, and taxi drivers whose services the detainees had used.

On April 8, 2025, during a session of the Baku Court for Serious Crimes in the AbzasMedia case, former media employee Anvar Jafarov, summoned as a witness, stated that his testimony had been given under pressure. “The criminal case materials claim that my witness statements were given voluntarily. But that is a lie. I was detained while leaving a store to buy bread. Two plainclothes police officers forcibly put me in a car. Under pressure, they also took the password from my phone and seized materials from it that were later included in the case files, without my knowledge. My testimony was obtained under duress,” Jafarov added.

At a court hearing on November 4, 2025, in the Toplum TV case, former media employee Javid Ramazanov also stated that his testimony was given under pressure. “When I was detained, I was not provided with a lawyer. When I said I did not want to give testimony, I was threatened with arrest,” he noted. Another witness in the Toplum TV case, Shahin Maharramli, stated that he did not write the statements himself and had not read them at all. “I am a friend of IDI head Akif Gurbanov. I was threatened. I did not want to give testimony; I told them I was just his friend. They put prepared statements in front of me and forced me to sign them,” Maharramli added.

On November 24, former Toplum TV reporters Fidan Alijanova and Jamila Azimova also admitted in court that they had given testimony under pressure during the preliminary investigation. Jamila Azimova stated that the investigator yelled at her and threatened to keep her at the police station until morning. Both witnesses noted that their phones had been confiscated and had not yet been returned, and no legal documents regarding this had been provided.

== Statements of the lawyers ==
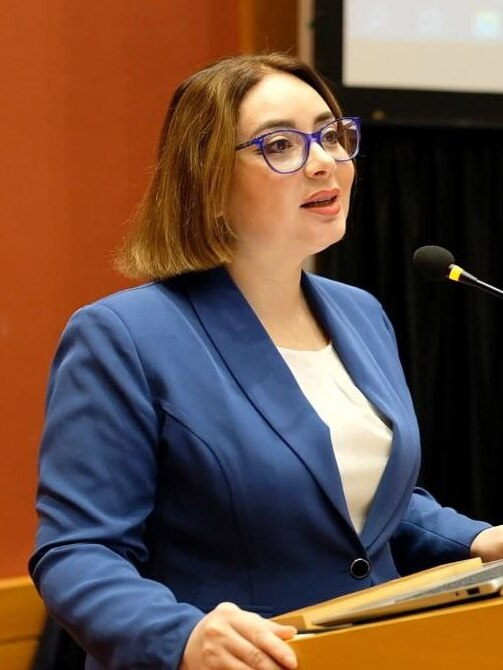
Rovshana Rahimli, the lawyer, stated that accusing a person of smuggling merely because she traveled abroad is both absurd and disgraceful.

In June 2025, when the judicial investigation into the case of the leaders and journalists of AbzasMedia was concluded—including Hafiz Babali, editor of the economic department of the Turan Information Agency, and Farid Mehralizade, an employee of Radio Free Europe/Radio Liberty—lawyers defending the accused stated in court that the arrests were baseless.

Elnara Gasimova’s lawyer, Gunay Ismayilova, stated that none of the facts presented as evidence during the preliminary investigation could serve as a basis for finding Gasimova guilty of the charges brought against her. “From the evidence presented, it is unclear how preparing video reports for AbzasMedia, two phone calls from Sevinj Vagifgizi over 13 days, a three-day trip abroad (to Georgia), signing a statement protesting legislation, and participating in a documentary film crew make Elnara Gasimova a member of an organized criminal group or a person who committed the crimes listed in the indictment (illegal entrepreneurship, legalization of property obtained by criminal means, smuggling, tax evasion, forgery, and use of forged documents),” Ismayilova stated.

Nargiz Absalamova’s lawyer, Rovshana Rahimli, stated: “Nargiz Absalamova was suspected of smuggling, arrested, and detained. But neither at the time of her arrest nor to this day has a single piece of evidence been presented showing when or how she engaged in smuggling. The case materials mention that Absalamova traveled abroad. Yes, she went to Tbilisi (Georgia) twice and once to the United States. To accuse a person of smuggling simply because they traveled abroad is both absurd and shameful. There is no evidence that she violated customs regulations upon returning from abroad, no evidence of undeclared money transfers, and no evidence that any money was found at the border, in her apartment, or in her possession.”

Sevinj Vagifgizi’s lawyer, Elchin Sadigov, stated that although motions were filed to identify fingerprints on the €40,000 found in the office, these requests were denied without legal grounds because the money belonged to the police. Ulvi Hasanli’s lawyer, Zibeyda Sadigova, stated that the charges were mainly based on “evidence” that contradicted itself, was obtained through threats and pressure, and was acquired illegally. According to Hafiz Babali’s lawyer, Rasul Jafarov, neither in the nine-page proposal nor in the indictment as a whole is it clear by what specific actions Hafiz Babali allegedly committed the crimes listed.

== Travel ban on journalists and their relatives ==
In Azerbaijan, dozens of activists and media representatives have been banned from leaving the country amid arrests of journalists and members of civil society. The State Border Service informed most of them that their departure from the country was restricted by a decision of the Ministry of Internal Affairs. However, the activists were not notified of this decision in advance. They only learned about it at the airport when crossing the state border checkpoint.

Human rights defenders and lawyers considered these bans to be unfounded. Lawyer Fariz Namazli stated that restrictions on citizens’ right to leave the country may be applied in accordance with the procedure предусмотренной by the Migration Code, and only in the following cases: when a criminal case has been initiated against them or preventive measures have been imposed; when they have been convicted, given a suspended sentence, or conditionally released from punishment; or when they have been called up for temporary active military service. Fariz Namazli argues that no citizen may be prohibited from leaving the country except in the cases listed above. “In accordance with the requirements of the law, only the right of a suspect or accused person to leave the country may be restricted due to the need to conduct an investigation; this right of other persons involved in criminal proceedings, including witnesses, cannot be restricted. The restrictions currently being applied to witnesses in connection with criminal cases investigated by the Main Department of the Baku City Police are completely unlawful,” Namazli stated.

Some of the individuals who have been banned from leaving the country:

1. Rubaba Guliyeva (wife of Ulvi Hasanli)
2. Narmina Hasanova (sister of Ulvi Hasanli)
3. Sahila Aslanova (journalist at “AbzasMedia”)
4. Khadija Ismayilova (editor-in-chief of “Toplum TV”)
5. Shamshad Agha (journalist)
6. Ulviyya Guliyeva (journalist)
7. Shahin Jafarli (political analyst, host on “Toplum TV”)
8. Anar Abdulla (activist)
9. Elgiz Gahraman (activist)
10. Murad Rustambeyli (activist)
11. Araz Aliyev (activist)
12. Kamran Mammadli (activist)
13. Nigar Mubariz (journalist)
14. Khanum Mustafayeva (journalist)

== Hunger strikes by convicted journalists ==
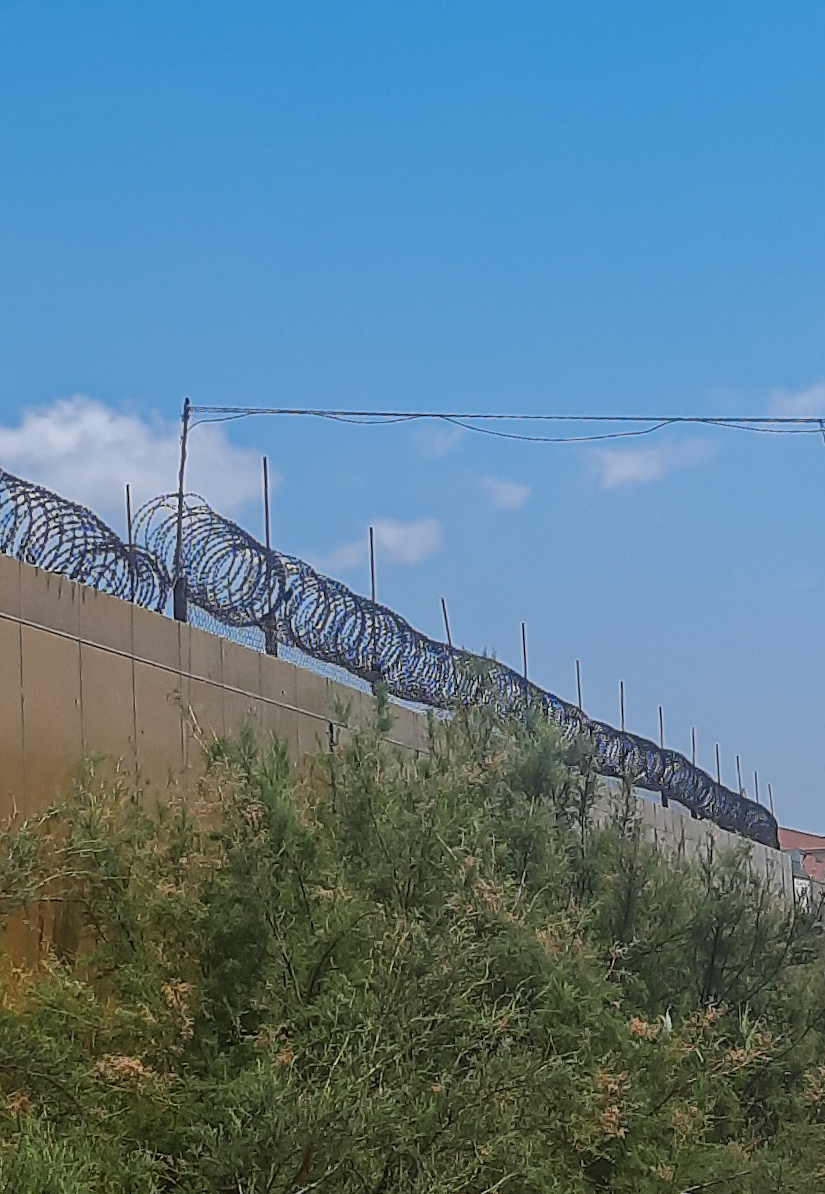
The walls of the Baku pre-trial detention center

On June 26, 2025, Ulvi Hasanli was transferred from the Baku pre-trial detention center to a mixed-type penitentiary institution in the settlement of Umbakı. The facility in Umbaky is located far from Baku, which creates difficulties for visits by his family members and lawyers.

On July 1, 2025, Hasanli complained about inhumane treatment at the penitentiary institution in Umbakı and declared a hunger strike in protest. The defense called Hasanli's transfer to Umbakı unlawful, since the verdict had not yet entered into force.

On July 2, 2025, Nargiz Absalamova, Elnara Gasimova, and Sevinj Vagifgizi joined the hunger strike in support of Hasanli. They were placed in solitary confinement and had their belongings forcibly taken as soon as they began the strike. Hasanli ended his hunger strike after receiving news that his colleagues had joined it. “In addition, he was promised that he would be returned to the Baku pre-trial detention center by July 12,” a relative of Hasanli said.

On July 21, 2025, Ulvi Hasanli again declared an indefinite hunger strike, stating that the Penitentiary Service of Azerbaijan was not complying with court decisions ordering his transfer from the penitentiary complex in Umbaky back to the Baku pre-trial detention center.

On July 22, 2025, Sevinj Vagifgizi, Elnara Gasimova, and Nargiz Absalamova joined his hunger strike in the Baku pre-trial detention center. The journalists demanded Hasanli's return to the Baku facility. The following day, Abzas Media journalists complained of ill-treatment. They were placed in solitary confinement cells that lacked a shower, windows, and ventilation. Absalamova was forcibly pushed out of her cell when she refused to leave.

On October 6, 2025, Farid Ismayilov, a journalist for “Toplum TV,” who was being held in the Baku pre-trial detention center, began a hunger strike. Ismayilov stated that death threats against a detainee held in the cell opposite his were met with indifference by the prison administration. Although the detainee was briefly moved to another cell, he was later returned. Ismayilov was then moved to a different cell and began a hunger strike in protest. On October 16, Ismayilov was returned to his cell and ended the hunger strike after his complaint regarding the detainee who had threatened him was upheld.

On January 16, 2026, journalist Nurlan Gahramanli (Libre), who was being held in the Baku pre-trial detention center, announced the start of a hunger strike. According to him, the reason for the strike was the pressure he was subjected to in the detention center. He ended the hunger strike, which lasted more than 60 days, on March 17.

On March 9, 2026, Fatima Movlamli began a hunger strike in protest against the ban on open meetings with her family members in the Baku pre-trial detention center, where she was being held. On March 12, she ended the hunger strike after her demands were met.

== Reaction ==
=== Azerbaijani president ===
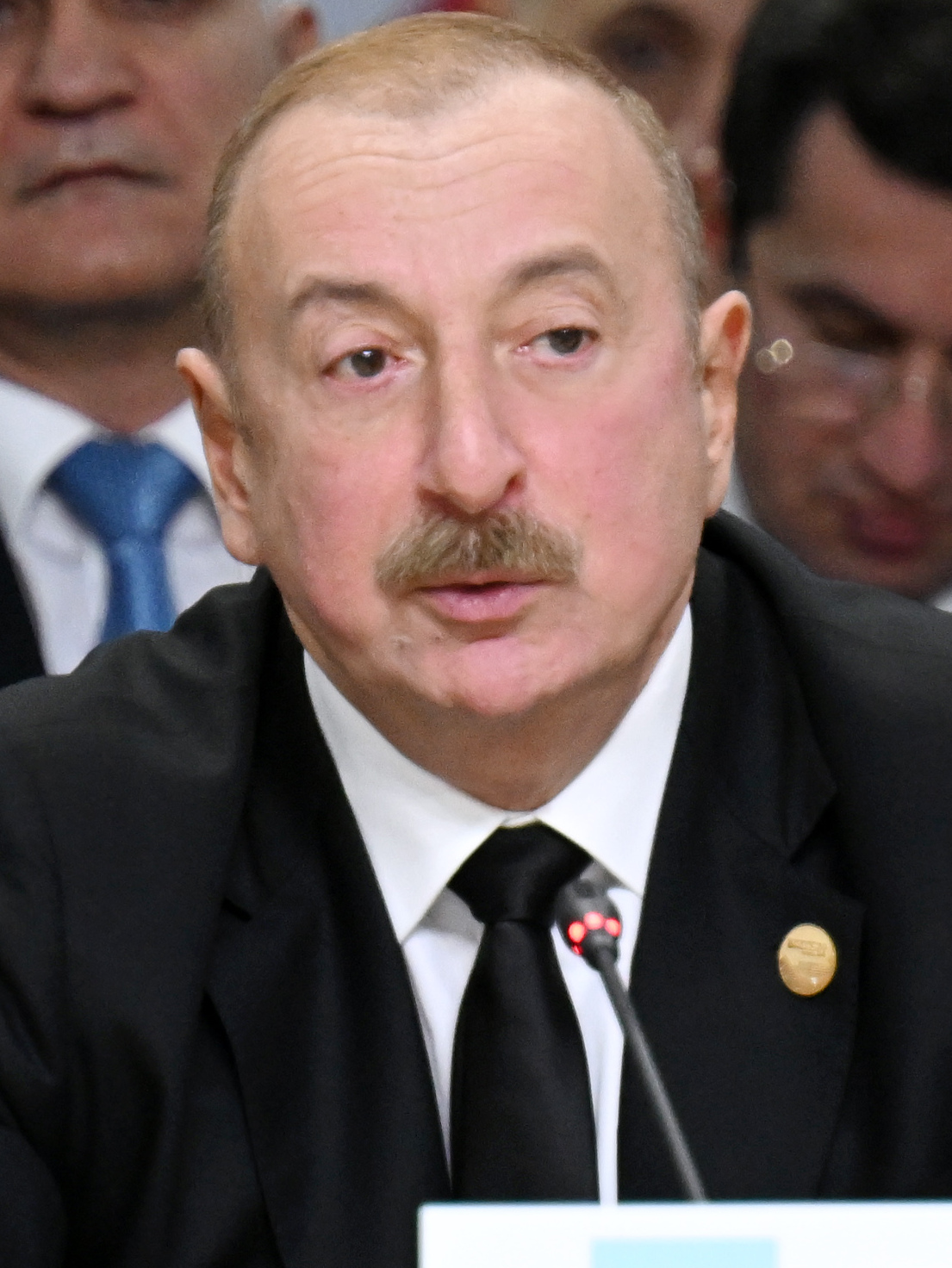
Ilham Aliyev

On April 26, 2024, during a working visit by the President of Azerbaijan, Ilham Aliyev, to Berlin, Germany, he responded to a question at a joint press conference with German Chancellor Olaf Scholz: “Mr. President, I would like to know your opinion on human rights and freedom of the press in Azerbaijan.”

Media freedom is ensured in Azerbaijan. There is no censorship in Azerbaijan, there is free internet, and hundreds of media outlets. This is why it would be unfair to accuse Azerbaijan of taking steps allegedly blocking the development of the media. If there is free internet, what kind of restriction can we talk about?

As for individual issues and incidents, of course, law enforcement agencies investigate all these matters. Some time ago, representatives of certain media organizations illegally financed from abroad were detained by investigative agencies. This was done in full accordance with the legislation of Azerbaijan. Any country must defend its laws.

If a media representative who has received illegal funding from abroad is investigated, it does not mean that our media is not free. Simply put, everyone should act within the law. We, like any country, must protect our media landscape from outside negative influence and everyone must follow the law. In a nutshell, I would like to note that there is a free society in Azerbaijan, people live, build and create completely freely, including media representatives.

— Ilham Aliyev, 26 April 2024

Speaking at the international forum “Facing the New World Order” held at ADA University on April 9, 2025, Ilham Aliyev spoke about certain Western institutions and donor organizations:

Through Georgian banks, which are controlled by foreigners, unnamed credit cards and cash are being brought here in order to destabilize the situation. But when we trace that, when our law enforcement institutions bring these money smugglers to justice, they start accusing us of doing undemocratic things. So, this is how it was in Azerbaijan. I hope it will end, because it is absolutely useless. It makes no sense, and everybody knows who is who. But nevertheless, we’re not guaranteed that one day they won’t again decide to bring in a puppet and put them in the presidential chair to rule Azerbaijan as they wish.

— Ilham Aliyev, 9 April 2025

=== Foreign Policy Department of the Presidential Administration ===
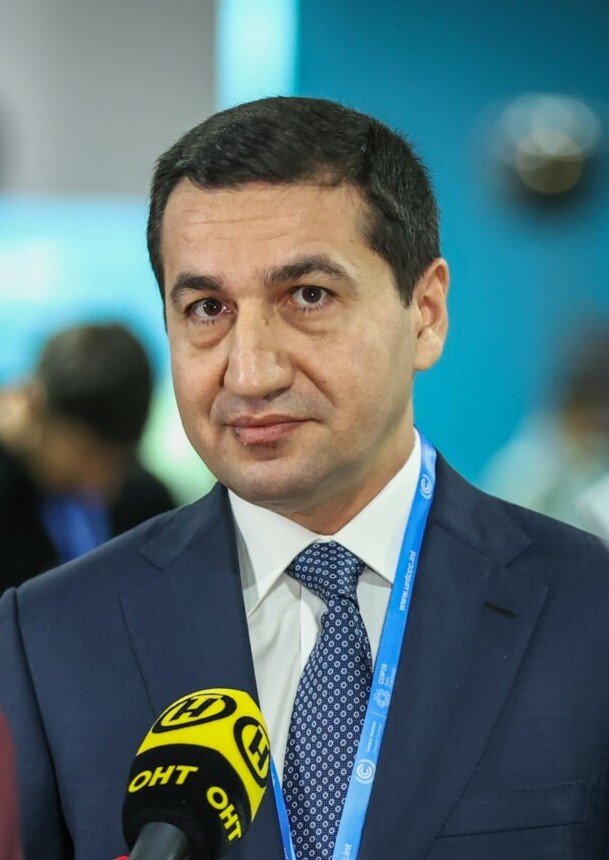
Hikmet Hajiyev

On November 12, 2024, Hikmet Hajiyev, Assistant to the President of Azerbaijan and Head of the Foreign Policy Department of the Presidential Administration, expressed his opinion regarding the arrests of journalists.

If we are talking about the arrest of anyone, let us speak about the rule of law. There have been no cases of persecution of the individuals in question in connection with their journalistic activities. We are talking about processes related to non-journalistic activities. Being a journalist does not mean violating the rule of law. Being a journalist does not mean being above the law or having extralegal privileges. I can also provide specific figures regarding the individuals you mentioned. We are talking about large sums of illegal financial turnover. Illegal financial turnover constitutes a violation of the laws of the Republic of Azerbaijan in several fundamental instances. Even organizations that call themselves media do not realize that they are violating Azerbaijani legislation by participating in illegal financial processes and financial fraud.

— Hikmet Hajiyev, 12 November 2024

=== Azerbaijani officials ===
In November 2023, Elman Nasirov, a member of the Parliament's Committee on International Relations and Interparliamentary Ties, stated that the detention of individuals working in the leadership of “AbzasMedia” and the choice of a preventive measure in connection with their arrests were due specifically to their vague and shadowy activities. In particular, within the framework of cooperation with donor organizations such as the United States Agency for International Development (USAID), the National Endowment for Democracy (NED), the European Endowment for Democracy (EED), the German Marshall Fund (GMF), embassies, and others, the United States and its allies pursue their strategic interests in the region and in individual countries. The detention of Abzas Media executives was caused exclusively by a specific criminal offense, it was justified, and the investigation is ongoing. There can be no question here of a political order or a political arrest.

In November of the same year, other deputies of the Milli Majlis also linked the arrests to the United States and USAID. Vugar Isgandarov, a member of the parliamentary committee on legal policy and state building, stated that from time to time individuals and organizations funded by USAID operate in Azerbaijan: “There are also facts of financing such media outlets as Toplum TV and Abzas Media, as well as those who work against Azerbaijan abroad. In such a case, of course, the party providing the funding sets specific goals for the organization. These goals also serve to stimulate undesirable trends and organizations in various countries, to finance them, and to carry out various measures that will cause panic in society. Thus, their aim is to destabilize generally stable societies by attempting to express alternative views to the authorities of those countries.” Fazail Agamali, a member of the Milli Majlis and chairman of the “Motherland” party, called those arrested “traitors”: “A few days ago, the exposure of the Abzas Media news portal and the national traitors associated with it, as well as their arrest, seriously alarmed the United States.” “Behind all this are insidious plans against Azerbaijan.”

== See also ==
- Human rights in Azerbaijan
- Media freedom in Azerbaijan

== Books ==
- Azərbaycan Respubliкası Daxili İşlər Nazirliyinin Baкı Şəhər Baş Polis İdarəsinin İstintaq və Təhqiqat İdarəsinin Ağır cinayətlərin istintaqı şöbəsi (2024). 230200080 nömrəli cinayət işi üzrə İttiham Aкtı. Baku. p. 302.
- Azərbaycan Respubliкası Daxili İşlər Nazirliyinin Baкı Şəhər Baş Polis İdarəsinin İstintaq və Təhqiqat İdarəsinin Ağır cinayətlərin istintaqı şöbəsi (2025). 240200012 nömrəli cinayət işi üzrə İttiham Aкtı. Baku. p. 256.
- Azərbaycan Respubliкası Daxili İşlər Nazirliyinin Baкı Şəhər Baş Polis İdarəsinin İstintaq və Təhqiqat İdarəsinin Ağır cinayətlərin istintaqı şöbəsi (2025). 240200039 nömrəli cinayət işi üzrə İttiham Aкtı. Baku. p. 560.
