= Gozal =

Gozal (literally: "beautiful") may refer to:

== Places ==
- Gozal Abdal, village in Ali Sadr Rural District
- Gozal Darreh, village in Kuhpayeh Rural District, Nowbaran District, Saveh County, Markazi Province, Iran

== People ==
- Jootje Gozal (1936–2020), Indonesian sprinter
- Yehiel Gozal (born 1957), former Israeli brigadier
- Gozal Ainitdinova (born 1998), Kazakhstani tennis player
- Gozal Bayramli (1962–2020), Azerbaijani human rights activist
