= Zibeyda Sadigova =

Azerbaijani human rights lawyer

- Zibeydə Sadıqova
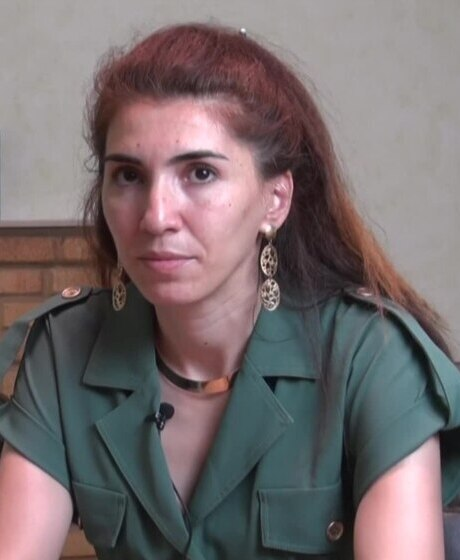
- Zibeyda Sadigova in 2024
- Born: February 26, 1985 (age 41)
- Citizenship: Azerbaijan
- Education: Baku State University
- Occupations: lawyer, human rights defender
- Years active: 2007–

Zibeyda Sadigova (full name: Zibeyda Sohbat gizi Sadigova; (Azerbaijani: Zibeydə Söhbət qızı Sadıqova); born on February 26, 1985) is an Azerbaijani human rights lawyer. For over 15 years, she has been dedicated to human rights advocacy, with a particular focus on women's rights and combating domestic violence. As a member of the Bar Association of the Republic of Azerbaijan, she has defended the rights of nearly a dozen political prisoners in the country.

== Early years ==
Zibeyda Sadigova was born on February 26, 1985. From 2001 to 2005, she studied at the Faculty of Law of Baku State University.

== Advocacy career ==
Zibeyda Sadigova has been defending the rights of individuals arrested for political reasons in Azerbaijan for many years. She also focuses on women's rights and combating domestic violence.

Sadigova has defended the rights of several individuals, including; Aliabbas Rustamov, a lawyer arrested in June 2014; Giyas Ibrahimov, an activist arrested in May 2016; Fikret Faramazoglu, a journalist arrested in June 2016; Fuad Ahmedli, an activist from the Popular Front Party of Azerbaijan (PFPA), arrested in August 2016; Gozal Bayramli, a politician arrested in May 2017; Afgan Mukhtarli, an activist arrested in May 2017; Pasha Umudov, a PFPA activist arrested in October 2019; Niyameddin Ahmadov, another PFPA activist arrested in March 2020; Bakhtiyar Hajiyev, a politician arrested in December 2022; Gubad Ibadoghlu, an economist arrested in July 2023; Afiyaddin Mammadov, a labor rights activist arrested in September 2023; Ulvi Hasanli, the founder of Abzas Media, arrested in November 2023; Ilhamiz Guliyev, a human rights defender arrested in December 2023; Farid Ismayilov, a journalist with Toplum TV, arrested in March 2024; Bahruz Samadov, a researcher arrested in August 2024; Natig Javadly, a journalist with Meydan TV, arrested in December 2024.

She also defended the rights of various political figures arrested on administrative charges for political reasons, such as: Rahim Gaziyev, a former Minister of Defense (2017), Nemat Panahov, an activist (2018), Ilham Huseyn, a PFPA activist (2019), Emin Maniyev, a PFPA activist (2019), Rustam Ismayilbayli, a young activist (2020), Elmir Abbasov, an activist (2021, 2023), Ahmad Mammadli, an activist (2022), Veli Shukurov, a photojournalist (2023), Anar Abdulla, a journalist (2021), Jalal Javadov, an activist (2025).
