= Akif Gurbanov =

Azerbaijani politician

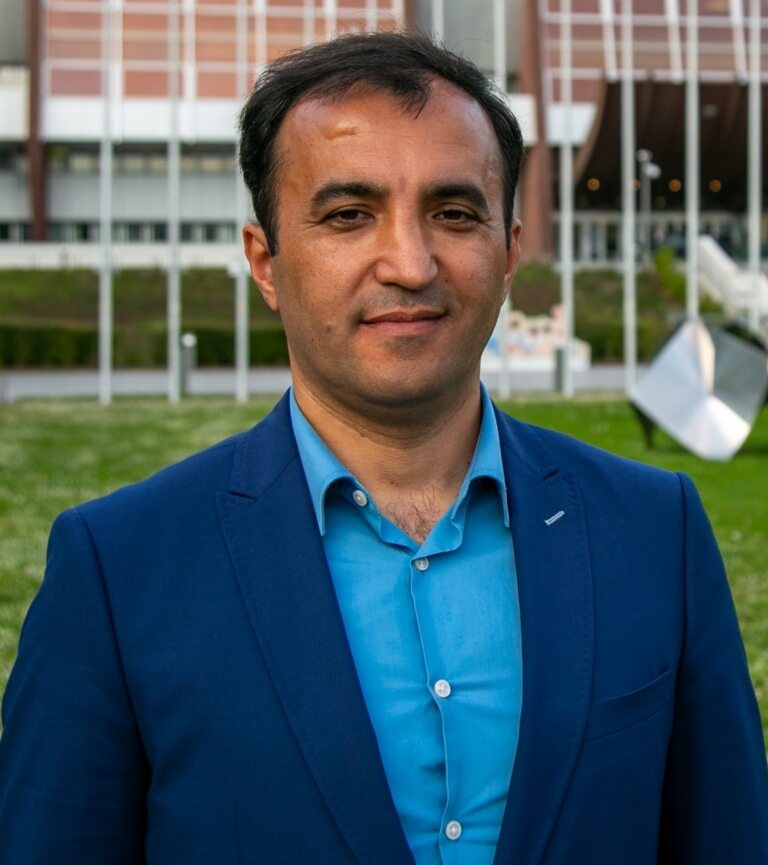
- Born: 3 August 1981 (age 45); Georgia
- Citizenship: Azerbaijan
- Education: Azerbaijan Medical University, Kharkiv National University
- Years active: since 2002
- Known for: Political activism

Akif Gurbanov (Azerbaijani: Akif Qurbanov; born 3 August 1981, Georgia) is an Azerbaijani politician and political activist; a member of the Central Election Commission (2006–2016); founder and leader of the Institute for Democratic Initiatives (IDI); founder of several independent media outlets, including "Fakt Yoxla" and "Toplum TV"; one of the founders of the Third Republic Platform and its chairman since 2024.

On 7 March 2024, he was arrested under Article 206.3.2 of the Criminal Code (smuggling), and was recognized as a political prisoner by local and international human rights organizations. Calls for his release were made to Azerbaijan by international human rights organizations.

He is currently held in the Pre-trial Detention Center of the Penitentiary Service of the Ministry of Justice.

== Early life and education ==
Gurbanov was born in 1981 in Georgia. He graduated from Zangi High School No. 289 in 1998. From 1998 to 2004, he pursued higher education in the medical school and preventive medicine at Azerbaijan Medical University. In 2008, he completed the School of Politics at the Council of Europe in Strasbourg, France. From 2013 to 2016, he studied law at the Faculty of Law at V. N. Karazin Kharkiv National University. In 2014, he participated in the United States' "Open World Program."

He is married with three children.

== Political activism ==
Gurbanov began his political activity in 2002 with the Umid Party. From 2002 to 2005, he served as the deputy chairman for youth affairs within the party. After leading the Central Election Headquarters of Umid Party from 2005 to 2006, he was elected as a member of the Central Election Commission by the National Assembly in 2006 and again in 2011, based on the party's nomination.

During his speech regarding the 2015 parliamentary elections, Gurbanov said that the elections were not organized in accordance with local election legislation or international obligations, and that Azerbaijan's refusal of the OSCE's voluntary observation proposal lacked a democratic basis. He pointed out that, by the time of his speech, 17 amendments had been made to the election code, covering 200 articles, with 95% of these amendments being restrictive. He emphasized that the imprisonment and pressure on civil society representatives had a negative impact on the elections, and noted that no election debates were held on television channels. Despite footage proving electoral fraud, he declared that the officially recorded results had not been reconsidered, and he refused to sign the protocol.

Since 2013, Gurbanov has been the co-founder and leader of the Institute for Democratic Initiatives (IDI), which has organized courses to train young human rights defenders, journalists, and leaders. In addition to this, the institute has been involved in election monitoring and the preparation of political documents.

In 2015, the Extractive Industries Transparency Initiative (EITI), of which Azerbaijan is a member, said that Azerbaijan's civil society environment did not meet the standards of the initiative and gave the country time to make changes and lower its membership status. In 2016, Gurbanov was elected as a council member of the EITI Coalition. During his tenure as a council member, Gurbanov advocated for improving the situation of Azerbaijani civil society within the framework of EITI standards. He opposed the Azerbaijani government's presentation of formal reforms as improvements to civil society during his time in office.

In 2016, Qurbanov was one of the founders of the Civil Society Platform (STP), which was established to raise public awareness about the social and political situation in Azerbaijan.

On the 105th anniversary of the Azerbaijani Parliament (December 7, 2023), the Third Republic Platform was announced as an opposition political movement founded by Gurbanov and others. The platform claims values of democratic transition, good governance, and decentralization. Gurbanov was elected as the chairman of the platform for one year, responsible for representing the platform and organizing decision-making processes.

On 21 December 2024, Qurbanov was awarded the "Nargiz" Prize.

In August 2024, Gurbanov was nominated for the Václav Havel Human Rights Prize by the Council of Europe.

== Arrest and detention ==
On 6 March 2024, Qurbanov was arrested at the office of the Third Republic Platform and a criminal case was opened against him under Article 206.3.2 of the Criminal Code (smuggling; on preliminary arrangement by group of persons). On the same day, Ruslan Izzatli, another co-founder of the Third Republic Platform, and Alasgar Mammadli, co-founder of "Toplum TV," were also arrested. On March 9, a detention order was issued for them. Additionally, four more employees of "Toplum TV" – Ali Zeynalov, Ilkin Ahmadov, Ramil Babayev, and Mushvig Jabbar – were arrested under the same charge. Two other employees, Elmir Abbasov and Farid Ismailov, were placed under police supervision.

While Gurbanov's father was taking his children to school, the police forcibly searched the car in front of the children, taking phones and tablets that were intended for schoolwork and communication purposes. During his speech in court on May 23, 2024, Gurbanov said that his arrest, as well as the arrest of other civil society representatives, had no legal basis, justice, or respect for human rights. He emphasized that they had been imprisoned on fabricated charges, and that the methods of punishment used showed a lack of respect for the personal and family lives of those accused. He compared Azerbaijan's governing methods to those of Stalin and the NKVD. Following this, he was denied phone conversations with his family, and a high-ranking official came to the detention center to threaten him with torture if he continued his statements.

On 6 November 2024, the Observatory for the Protection of Human Rights Defenders announced a call on the participants of the European Political Community Summit to address the climate of repression. On 10 January 2025, Amnesty International published an urgent call for release of imprisoned journalists and others including Gurbanov.

On 28 July 2026, Gurbanov was convicted and sentenced to 15 years in prison. Izzatli, Mammadli, and others associated with Toplum TV were also sentenced to 12–15 years in prison. The convictions were denounced by Reporters Without Borders and the European and International Federation of Journalists.
