= Farid Ismayilov =

Azerbaijani journalist

- Fərid İsmayılov
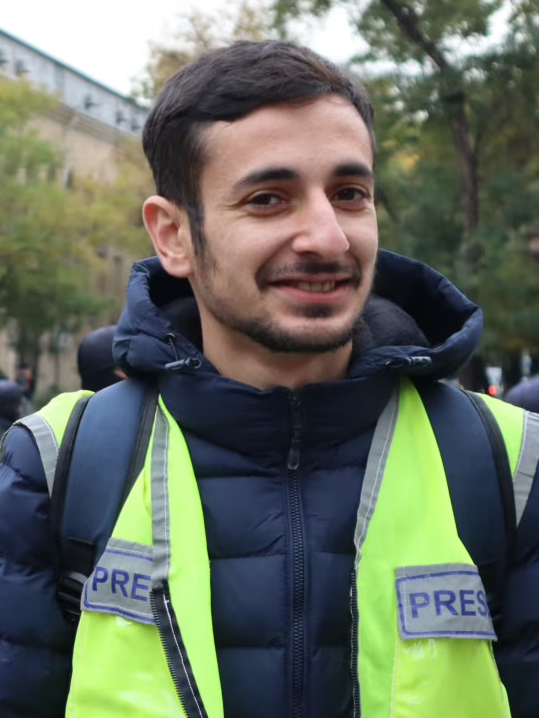
- Farid Ismayilov in 2021
- Born: September 4, 1998 (age 28); Xırdalan, Azerbaijan
- Citizenship: Azerbaijan
- Education: Azerbaijan State Oil and Industry University (B); Baku Engineering University (M)
- Occupations: Journalist, political prisoner
- Years active: 2019–present

Farid Ismayilov (full name: Farid Alihuseyn oglu Ismayilov, Azerbaijani: Fərid Əlihüseyn oğlu İsmayılov; born September 4, 1998, Xırdalan, Azerbaijan) is an Azerbaijani journalist and political prisoner; a reporter for Toplum TV.

On March 6, 2024, he was brought to criminal liability in the case against the managers and journalists of Toplum TV, initiated by the Investigation Department of the Main Police Department of the city of Baku. Although he was released on March 8, 2024, after a preventive measure of being placed under police supervision was chosen, he was arrested on January 17, 2025, by decision of the Khatai District Court. On January 22, 2025, the charges in the criminal case investigated by the Main Police Department of the city of Baku were aggravated. Farid Ismayilov and the other persons arrested in this case were charged under seven articles of the Criminal Code. The defendants were brought new charges under Articles 162-1.1 (engaging workers in any work without concluding an employment contract), 192.3.2 (illegal entrepreneurship, particularly involving large-scale income), 193-1.3.1 (legalization of property obtained by criminal means), 193-1.3.2 (…committed in large sums), 206.4 (smuggling by an organized group), and 213.2.1 (tax evasion committed by an organized group) of the Criminal Code.

A number of local and international human rights organizations condemned Farid Ismayilov's arrest, calling it politically motivated, and urged the Azerbaijani authorities to release him immediately.

He is currently held in the Baku Pre-trial Detention Center of the Penitentiary Service of the Ministry of Justice.

== Early years and journalistic activity ==
Farid Alihuseyn oglu Ismayilov was born on September 4, 1998, in the city of Xırdalan, Absheron District.

From 2015 to 2019, he studied at the Azerbaijan State Oil and Industry University.

From 2019 to 2021, he received a master's degree at Baku Engineering University (BEU).

From 2021 to 2022, he served in the Armed Forces of Azerbaijan.

He has been engaged in journalism since 2019. In 2019–2021, he worked as a reporter at the online channel "Kanal13", and since 2022 he has worked as a reporter at Toplum TV. In the course of his professional activity, he has repeatedly been subjected to detentions, police obstruction, and ill-treatment.

On June 25, 2023, Farid Ismayilov was interviewing residents of Chovdar (Dashkasan District), a village neighboring Soyudlu, when two plainclothes men who introduced themselves as police officers approached him and tried to take his camera, stating that local officials had banned reporting from that settlement. The Committee to Protect Journalists (CPJ) called on Baku to investigate the incident.

== Arrest and trial (2025–2026) ==
On March 6, 2024, the Ministry of Internal Affairs conducted an оперативный search in the office of the Institute for Democratic Initiatives (IDI) and the online channel Toplum TV. As a result, a criminal case was opened against seven people, including Toplum TV video editor Mushfig Jabbarov, reporter Farid Ismayilov, and social media manager Elmir Abbasov. Each of them was held criminally liable as a suspect under Article 206.3.2 of the Criminal Code (smuggling committed by a group of persons by prior conspiracy). It was reported that €3,100 in cash was found in Farid Ismayilov's apartment. Ismayilov and his lawyer Zibeyda Sadigova said the money did not belong to him and that police planted it in the apartment. Toplum TV editor-in-chief Khadija Ismayilova called the searches and detentions at Toplum TV a suppression of media freedom. Ismayilov was then taken to the Main Police Department of the city of Baku, where he was questioned. On March 8, Farid Ismayilov was released and placed under police supervision as a preventive measure.

At noon on January 17, Farid Ismayilov was detained by police at his apartment and taken to the Main Police Department of the city of Baku. A motion was prepared to revoke the preventive measure of placing him under the supervision of a designated police officer and replace it with detention. On the same day, by decision of Judge Sulhana Hajiyeva of the Khatai District Court, Farid Ismayilov was remanded in custody for 2 months and 20 days. On January 22, Farid Ismayilov's lawyer, Zibeyda Sadigova, met with him in the Baku Pre-trial Detention Center. "Farid Ismayilov stated that the reason for choosing detention as a preventive measure against him was his journalistic activity during the investigation period. In court, the prosecutor’s office said that Ismayilov allegedly visited certain regions of Azerbaijan in July–August and did not inform the investigation. This is completely untrue. First, Ismayilov did not visit the regions mentioned; he visited other regions and informed the investigation about this. If the prosecutor’s office uses this as a pretext, why did it not present reasons for choosing detention as a preventive measure against Ismayilov in July–August? Second, no information was provided about Farid Ismayilov being present in any region that would obstruct the investigation. He did not hide from the investigation," Sadigova noted.

The pre-trial investigation in the criminal case was completed on January 22. In the framework of the criminal case conducted by the Main Police Department of the city of Baku, new charges were brought against him under Articles 162-1.1 (engaging workers in any work without an employment contract), 192.3.2 (illegal entrepreneurship, particularly involving large-scale income), 193-1.3.1 (legalization of property obtained by criminal means), 193-1.3.2 (…committed in large sums), 206.4 (smuggling by an organized group), and 213.2.1 (tax evasion committed by an organized group) of the Criminal Code.

On January 24, the Baku Court of Appeal considered an appeal against the arrest of journalist Farid Ismayilov. Lawyer Zibeyda Sadigova said the defense argued there was no need to keep the journalist in custody given his health problems and the completion of the pre-trial investigation. The lawyer also noted that Ismayilov had been under police supervision during the investigation and did not evade appearing at the police. He also has serious health problems and has undergone seven operations. Despite this, the court upheld the decision of the first-instance court.

On July 27, the Baku Grave Crimes Court sentenced Ismayilov to 12 years in prison.

== International attention ==
Immediately after the arrests in March 2024, the Committee to Protect Journalists (CPJ) called on the Azerbaijani authorities to release the journalists of Toplum TV, drop all charges against the staff of the independent news organization, and create conditions for the free work of the media. Reporters Without Borders (RSF) condemned the persecution of independent media in Azerbaijan and the "countless" arrests of journalists.

On January 22, the Committee to Protect Journalists (CPJ) issued a statement condemning the arrest of Farid Ismayilov.

== See also ==
- Media freedom in Azerbaijan
