= Fatima Movlamli =

Azerbaijani journalist

- Fatimə Mövlamlı
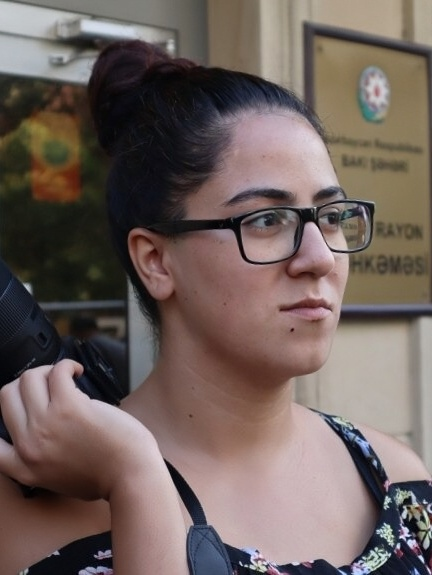
- Fatima Movlamli in 2023
- Born: November 3, 2000 (age 26); Baku, Azerbaijan
- Citizenship: Azerbaijan
- Occupations: Journalist, political prisoner
- Years active: 2020–present

Fatima Movlamli (full name: Fatima Gachay gizi Movlamli, Azerbaijani: Fatimə Qaçay qızı Mövlamlı; born; November 3, 2000, Baku, Azerbaijan) — Azerbaijani journalist and political prisoner.

Fatima Movlamli was detained by police on February 28, 2025, and placed under investigation as a suspect in criminal case No. 240200039, the preliminary investigation of which was conducted by the Main Police Department of the City of Baku. She was arrested on March 1, 2025, by a decision of the Khatai District Court. Fatima Movlamli and nine other journalists who had been arrested before her were charged under Article 206.3.2 of the Criminal Code (smuggling committed by a group of persons by prior conspiracy). On August 28, 2025, the charges in the criminal case investigated by the Main Police Department of the city of Baku were made more severe. Movlamli and other persons arrested in this case were charged under eight articles of the Criminal Code. The defendants were additionally charged under Articles 192.2.2 (illegal entrepreneurship resulting in large income), 192.2.3 (… committed by an organized group), 193-1.3.1 (legalization of property obtained by criminal means), 193-1.3.2 (… committed on a significant scale), 206.4 (smuggling committed by an organized group), 213.2.1 (tax evasion committed by an organized group), 320.1 (forgery of documents), and 320.2 (use of forged documents) of the Criminal Code of Azerbaijan.

A number of local and international human rights organizations condemned the arrest of Fatima Movlamli, calling it politically motivated, and urged the Azerbaijani authorities to immediately release her.

She is currently being held at the Baku pre-trial detention center of the Penitentiary Service of the Ministry of Justice.

== Early life and journalistic work ==
Fatima Gachay gizi Movlamli was born on November 3, 2000, in Baku. From 2007 to 2011 she studied at Secondary School No. 18 named after M. Mushfig in Yasamal District, and from 2011 to 2016 at Secondary School No. 1 of Zangilan District (located in Binagadi District).

From a young age, Fatima Movlamli has been actively involved in socio-political processes. As an activist, she took part in several rallies and protest actions, was repeatedly detained by police, and subjected to ill-treatment.

She has worked in journalism since 2020. In 2020–2021 she worked as a reporter for the newspaper Azadlıq, in 2022–2023 as a reporter for Toplum TV, and in 2024 for the media platform JAMNews. Since December 2024 she has been cooperating with Meydan TV as a freelance correspondent.

== Arrest and trial (2025–2026) ==
On February 28, 2025, at around 13:00, Fatima Movlamli was forcibly detained by plainclothes individuals near the "Azadliq Avenue" metro station. A search was then conducted at her home in the Binagadi settlement. According to the record, €13,500 in cash was allegedly found in her apartment. Fatima Movlamli stated that the money did not belong to her and had been planted by the investigator, Police Captain Nahid Abbasli, who led the search. She also said that her arrest was linked to her journalistic work.

The Ministry of Internal Affairs reported that Fatima Movlamli was detained as a suspect in criminal case No. 240200039, the preliminary investigation of which is being conducted by the Main Police Department of the city of Baku. Within the framework of this criminal case, in December 2024 the editor-in-chief of Meydan TV, Aynur Elgunesh, video reporters Khayala Aghayeva, Ramin Deko, Aytaj Ahmadova and Aysel Umudova, political journalist Natig Javadli, and Ulvi Tahirov, co-founder of the Baku School of Journalism, were arrested, and in February 2025 the acting editor-in-chief of Meydan TV, Shamshad Aghayev, and independent reporter Nurlan Gahramanli were arrested.

On March 1, 2025, by a decision of Judge Sahiba Hajiyeva of the Khatai District Court, a preventive measure in the form of detention was imposed on Fatima Movlamli for a period of 1 month and 9 days. On March 6, 2025, the Criminal Chamber of the Baku Court of Appeal, composed of judges Zaur Huseynov (rapporteur), Ali Mammadov, and Emin Aliyev, considered Fatima Movlamli's appeal. The court rejected the appeal and Movlamli remained in custody.

On March 14, 2025, by a decision of Judge Sulkhana Gajiyeva of the Khatai District Court, Fatima Movlamli's detention was extended for another three months. On March 20, 2025, the Criminal Chamber of the Baku Court of Appeal, composed of judges Ibrahim Ibrahimov (rapporteur), Faig Ganiyev, and Afghan Alekberov, considered Fatima Movlamli's appeal. The court rejected the appeal and Movlamli again remained in custody.

On June 24, 2025, by a decision of Judge Rafael Sadikhov of the Khatai District Court, Fatima Movlamli's detention was extended for another 2 months and 22 days.

On August 28, 2025, the charges in the criminal case investigated by the Main Police Department of the City of Baku were made more severe. Fatima Movlamli and other persons arrested in this case were charged under eight articles of the Criminal Code. The defendants were additionally charged under Articles 192.2.2 (illegal entrepreneurship resulting in large income), 192.2.3 (… committed by an organized group), 193-1.3.1 (legalization of property obtained by criminal means), 193-1.3.2 (… committed on a significant scale), 206.4 (smuggling committed by an organized group), 213.2.1 (tax evasion committed by an organized group), 320.1 (forgery of documents), and 320.2 (use of forged documents) of the Criminal Code of Azerbaijan.

On September 16, 2025, by a decision of Judge Fuad Akhundov of the Khatai District Court, Fatima Movlamli's detention was extended for another three months.

== International attention ==
The arrest of Fatima Movlamli was condemned by the Committee to Protect Journalists (CPJ), which called on the Azerbaijani government to release her.

== See also ==
- Media freedom in Azerbaijan
