= Gozal Darreh =

Gozal Darreh گزل دره
- Village
- Location within Iran
- Coordinates: 35°19′31″N 49°25′18″E
- Country: Iran
- Province: Markazi
- County: Saveh
- Bakhsh: Nowbaran
- Rural District: Kuhpayeh

Population (2006)
  - Total: 145
- Time zone: UTC+3:30 (IRST)
  - Summer (DST): UTC+4:30 (IRDT)

Gozal Darreh (Persian: گزل دره; also known as Gosal Dareh, Qal‘eh, Qal‘eh-ye Gowzal Darreh, and Qal‘eh-ye Gozal Darreh) is a village in Kuhpayeh Rural District, Nowbaran District, Saveh County, Markazi Province, Iran. At the 2006 census, its population was 145, in 41 families.
