= Baku TV =

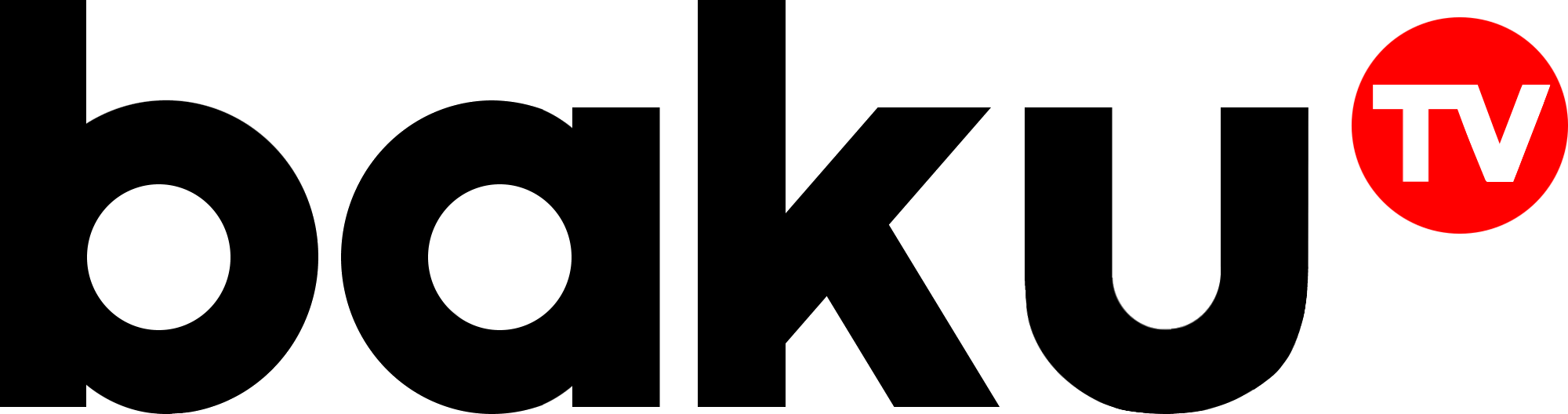

- The headquarter building of Baku TV
- Type: Internet television Satellite and cable
- Country: Azerbaijan
- Broadcast area: Nationwide
- Headquarters: Baku

Programming
- Language(s): Azerbaijani and Russian
- Picture format: 1080i HDTV

Ownership
- Owner: Global Media Group
- Key people: Ramin Jafarov

History
- Launched: 18 February 2018; 7 years ago
- Founder: Orkhan Mammadov

Links
- Website: baku.tv

Baku TV is an Azerbaijani internet-based, satellite, and cable television channel founded by Orkhan Mammadov and led by Ramin Jafarov. It began broadcasting on 18 February 2018, later as a linear television channel on satellite in 2023. It is owned by the Global Media Group.

== History ==
Baku TV commenced transmissions on 12 February 2018. The channel opened a Russian-language editorial office in 2021. The channel was one of the winners of the NETTY 2021 National Internet Awards held on 16 December of that year, specifically in the Information and News category. The National Television and Radio Council of the Republic of Azerbaijan granted Baku TV a license on 16 November 2022.

Baku TV commenced broadcasts on cable television in December 2022 after it was added onto the Connect TV cable provider. It was later made available onto other cable providers over time, such as on KATV1 and Aile TV. On 19 September 2023, Baku TV commenced test broadcasts on satellite television via Azerspace-1. Regular satellite broadcasts began on 30 October.
