= Turan Information Agency =

Turan Information Agency Turan İnformasiya Agentliyi
- Company type: Private
- Industry: News agency
- Founded: May 1990
- Headquarters: Baku, Azerbaijan
- Key people: Mehman Aliyev, editor-in-chief
- Products: Wire service
- Revenue: ▲
- Website: www.turan.az

Turan Information Agency (Azerbaijani: Turan İnformasiya Agentliyi) was a news agency based in Baku, Azerbaijan. It published in three languages: Azerbaijani, English, and Russian.

The Agency posted articles on the internet and periodically published bulletins.

On 13 February 2025 its website published a statement from the director, Mehman Aliyev, saying that for financial reasons Turan would "suspend the agency's activities in its present format."

== See also ==
- Media freedom in Azerbaijan
