= Mehman Aliyev =

Azerbaijani journalist

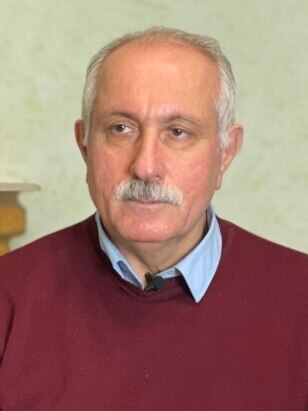
Aliyev in 2023.

Mehman Aliyev (Azerbaijani: Mehman Yadulla oğlu Əliyev) is the director of Turan Information Agency, a Baku-based news agency. He is a regular critic of the Azerbaijani government.

On 13 February 2025 Turan's website published a statement from Aliyev saying that for financial reasons Turan would "suspend the agency's activities in its present format."

== Awards ==
In 2012 Aliyev received the Human Rights House Network Award, for his "tireless and courageous and long-standing work for the freedom of expression in Azerbaijan".

== Criminal charges ==
Mehman Aliyev was charged with tax evasion and abuse of powers in August 2017. He was released from pretrial detention and put under house arrest later that year. Aliyev denied any wrongdoing. Human rights organizations and Western governments (including Reporters Without Borders and United States Department of State) condemned his arrest and called it politically motivated.
