= Elmir Abbasov =

- Born: 20 September 1994 (age 32); Baku, Azerbaijan
- Citizenship: Azerbaijani
- Education: Kastamonu University (B)
- Occupations: Civic activist, media worker, political prisoner
- Years active: 2015–present
- Organization(s): NIDA Civic Movement (2015–present); Toplum TV (2023–2024)
- Criminal charge(s): Smuggling; illegal entrepreneurship; money laundering; tax evasion; related financial offences
- Criminal penalty: 12 years' imprisonment (2026)
- Criminal status: Incarcerated

Elmir Abbasov (full name: Elmir Aghababa oghlu Abbasov; born 20 September 1994) is an Azerbaijani civic activist, media worker, and political prisoner. He has been a member of the "NIDA" Civic Movement since 2015 and sat on the movement's governing board from 2021 to 2023. Over the course of his activism, he has been detained on numerous occasions and arrested three times.

He worked as a social media manager at the independent broadcaster Toplum TV. He was charged in March 2024 as part of a wider criminal case against Toplum TV staff, and in July 2026 he was sentenced to 12 years' imprisonment and taken into custody directly in the courtroom. A number of Azerbaijani and international human rights organizations condemned the arrests of Abbasov and his co-defendants as politically motivated and called on the Azerbaijani authorities to release them immediately.

Abbasov has been held at the Baku Investigative Isolator since July 2026.

== Early life ==
Elmir Abbasov was born on 20 September 1994 in Baku. He studied at Kastamonu University from 2012 to 2018. In 2018, he returned to Azerbaijan and became involved in civic and political life.

== Activism ==
Abbasov has been a member of the "NIDA" Civic Movement since 2015 and served on the movement's governing board from 2021 to 2023.

In 2019 he completed the Young Leadership program of the Institute for Democratic Initiatives (IDI), and in 2022 he completed a political-management training program at the Institute of Political Management.

On 19 February 2021, Abbasov was detained in Sumgayit and taken to the Sumgayit City Police Department. He was charged under Article 206 of the Code of Administrative Offences (illegal possession of narcotics), and on 20 February 2021 a Sumgayit City Court judge, Parviz Hajiyev, sentenced him to 30 days' administrative detention. On 3 March 2021, the Sumgayit Court of Appeal, presided over by judge Elman Ahmadov, rejected an appeal filed by his defence lawyer. After his release, Abbasov told Voice of America that plainclothes police officers had picked him up near his home and taken him to the police department, where a deputy chief, police lieutenant colonel Rauf Babashov, cautioned him against posting criticism of the authorities on social media. Abbasov said that a few days earlier he had published a Facebook post sharply critical of President Ilham Aliyev, government ministers, and officials, and that as he was leaving the building he felt an officer slip a cellophane bag into his pocket; the bag, said to contain 0.315 grams of opium, was then "found" during a subsequent search and used as grounds for his arrest.

On 15 July and 6 August 2021, Abbasov was detained during protests outside the "Toplan" stray-animal shelter and in Fountains Square, both held in opposition to the culling of stray dogs.

On 13 October 2021, the "NIDA" Civic Movement and the D18 (Democracy 1918) Movement held a protest outside the former headquarters of the ruling New Azerbaijan Party against renaming Republic Day. Abbasov was detained during the action, charged under Article 535 of the Code of Administrative Offences (wilful disobedience of a lawful police order), and sentenced by a Sabail District Court judge, Ilkin Rustamli, to 30 days' administrative detention.

On 14 May 2022, he was one of the organizers of the "We Don't Want a Criminal State!" protest in Fountains Square.

On the evening of 21 June 2023, Abbasov was detained by police. He was charged under Articles 510 (petty hooliganism) and 535.1 (wilful disobedience of a lawful police order) of the Code of Administrative Offences, and on 22 June a Sumgayit City Court judge, Fikrat Aliyev, sentenced him to 20 days' administrative detention. According to "NIDA" and his lawyer, Zibeyda Sadigova, the real reason for his arrest was a Facebook post he had made a few days earlier criticizing the conduct of police officers toward residents during the Soyudlu protests, in which he described the officers involved as "immoral people".

From 2023, Abbasov worked as a social media manager (SMM) at "Toplum TV".

== Prosecution and imprisonment ==
On 6 March 2024, Azerbaijan's Ministry of Internal Affairs searched the offices of the Institute for Democratic Initiatives (IDI) and the online broadcaster Toplum TV. As a result, criminal proceedings were opened against Toplum TV video editor Mushfig Jabbarov, reporter Farid Ismayilov, social media manager Elmir Abbasov, and six other defendants. It was reported that €2,700 in cash was found in the apartment where Abbasov lived; Abbasov and his lawyer, Elchin Sadigov, said the money did not belong to him and had been planted by police. Toplum TV editor-in-chief Khadija Ismayilova described the searches and detentions as an attack on media freedom. Abbasov was subsequently taken to the Baku City Main Police Department for questioning; he was released on 8 March under a preventive measure of police supervision.

The pre-trial investigation concluded on 22 January 2025. As part of the investigation, conducted by the Baku City Main Police Department, Abbasov and eight co-defendants were charged with additional offences under the Criminal Code, including Article 162–1.1 (engaging workers without a formal employment contract), Article 192.3.2 (illegal entrepreneurship involving proceeds of an especially large amount), Articles 193–1.3.1 and 193–1.3.2 (legalization of criminally obtained property), Article 206.4 (smuggling by an organized group), and Article 213.2.1 (tax evasion by an organized group).

The trial concluded on 27 July 2026. At a hearing of the Baku Court for Grave Crimes presided over by judge Azer Taghiyev, the verdict was read out. Abbasov was sentenced to 12 years' imprisonment; he was taken into custody in the courtroom and transferred to the Baku Investigative Isolator. Independent reporting put his sentence at close to, or exactly, 12 years; Reporters Without Borders recorded it as 11 years, 11 months and 28 days.

A number of international media-freedom and human-rights organizations, including the International Federation of Journalists, Reporters Without Borders, the Committee to Protect Journalists, and Human Rights Watch, condemned the arrests and the sentences handed down in the case and called for the immediate release of those convicted, describing the trial as politically motivated.
