= Gozal Bayramli =

Azerbaijani politician and human rights activist (1962–2020)

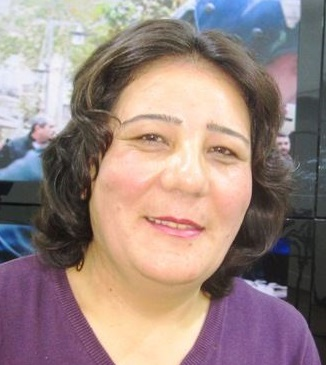
- Born: Gözəl Oruc qızı Bayramli; 27 April 1972; Baku, Azerbaijan SSR, Soviet Union
- Died: 7 October 2020 (aged 48); Baku, Azerbaijan
- Occupations: Opposition leader, human rights activist

Gozal Bayramli, also translated as Gozel Bayramli, (Azerbaijani: Gözəl Oruc qızı Bayramlı, 27 April 1962 – 7 October 2020) was a politician of Azerbaijan, member and deputy chairman of the Azerbaijani Popular Front Party (APFP) and a former political prisoner.

== Life and career ==
Bayramli was born in Baku on 27 April 1962.

For many years she was a member and deputy chairman of the Popular Front Party, which contributed to the formation of Azerbaijan's first government in 1992 after the fall of the Soviet Union, until Heydar Aliyev, the father of the current president of Azerbaijan, came to power in 1993. Since then Gozal Bayramli became one of the prominent women opposition figures advocating for democracy and a human rights activist, defending the rights of political prisoners in Azerbaijan. She was detained for political activism several times for short periods and then released.

== Political prisoner ==
Bayramli was detained by the State Border Services on May 25, 2017, when crossing the border from Georgia into Azerbaijan, returning home after medical treatment abroad. Authorities charged Bayramli with smuggling undeclared cash. Bayramli denied all charges, claiming they were politically motivated and insisted that the banknotes were planted in her bag.

In her testimony in court Baywamli stated that in October 2016, the security forces had summoned her to the Main Directorate of Organized Crime Department and threatened her with arrest if she refused to stop her "anti-state activities". She linked these threats with her defence of political prisoners in the "Nardaran case" and mentioned that soon after the conversation, she had started receiving threats over the phone and had reported it to law enforcement, but the latter did not objectively investigate the threats.

On January 23, 2018, by the decision of the Gazakh District Court, she was sentenced to 3 years in prison. Her arrest coincided with another arrest made by the Azerbaijani authorities of an opposition journalist and a human rights activist - Afgan Mukhtarli. Both Bayramli and Mukhtarli were arrested in May 2017 at different border crossing points with neighbouring Georgia and were sentenced to prison for smuggling. Both arrests and subsequent imprisonments received widespread international criticism.

Human Rights Watch issued a statement condemning the crackdown against critics of the regime and called on the Azerbaijani authorities to free both detainees. They were also considered prisoners of conscience by Amnesty International

The US State Department issued a statement condemning the verdict. The EU released a statement saying: "a review by Azerbaijan of any and all cases of incarceration related to the exercise of fundamental rights, including the freedom of expression, and immediate release of all of those concerned is urgent." PACE Committee on Legal Affairs and Human Rights also expressed concern about the situation of human rights in Azerbaijan and in particular the imprisonment of Gozel Bayramli.

After serving two years in prison she was granted presidential pardon in March 2019 ahead of the Novruz celebrations, along with 400 prisoners, including 51 political prisoners.

== Death ==
After her release from prison, Bayramli sought medical treatment at Heidelberg University Hospital in Germany and was diagnosed with a life-threatening condition. She had suffered numerous injuries as well as lack of nutrition and medical treatment during her time in prison. She died on October 7, 2020, in her house in Baku.

During her funeral service Azerbaijani authorities detained an opposition journalist on charges of violating the quarantine rules, who was later released. She reported that her phone, which was confiscated by police during her arrest, was not returned to her at the time of her release.
