= Criminal Code of Azerbaijan =

Criminal Code of Azerbaijan (Azerbaijani: Azərbaycan Cinayət Hüququ or Azərbaycan Cinayət Məcəlləsi) was adopted on December 30, 1999, and entered into force on September 1, 2000.

== Structure ==
The Criminal Code of Azerbaijan (the Code) consists of two parts (general part and special part), 12 sections, 35 chapters, and 353 articles. The sections are as follows:

General Part

- General Provision
- Crime
- About Punishment
- Release from Criminal Liability and Punishment
- Criminal Liability of Minors
- Forced Measures of Medical Nature

Special Part

- Crimes against Peace and Security of Humanity
- Crime against Individual
- Crimes in Economic Sphere
- Crimes against Public Safety and Social Order
- Crimes against State Power
- Crimes against Military Service

== Principles and Categories ==
=== Principles ===
The Code is based on 5 basic principles: 1. principle of legality; 2. principle of equality before the law; 3. principle of the responsibility for fault; 4. principle of validity; and 5. principle of humanism.

=== Categories of the crimes ===
The Code divides all crimes into four categories: 1. crimes not causing great public danger; 2. less serious crimes; 3. serious crimes; and 4. especially serious crimes. The crime falls within: 1. the first category if the maximum punishment for it does not exceed 2 (two) years of imprisonment; 2. the second category if the maximum punishment for it does not exceed 7 (seven) years of imprisonment; 3. the third category if the maximum punishment for it does not exceed 12 (twelve) years of imprisonment; 3. the third category if the maximum punishment for it does not exceed 12 (twelve) years of imprisonment; 4. the fourth category if the crime the punishment for it exceeds 12 (twelve) years of imprisonment.

== Punishments ==
=== Kinds of Punishments ===
The Code (article 42) defines 12 kinds of the punishments:

- penalty;
- deprivation of the right to operate a vehicle;
- deprivation of the right to hold the certain posts or to engage in the certain activity;
- public works;
- deprivation of special, military or an honorary title and state award;
- corrective works;
- restriction on military service;
- forced exile from the Azerbaijan Republic;
- restriction of freedom;
- maintenance in disciplinary military unit;
- imprisonment on the certain term;
- life imprisonment.

Confiscation of property was defined as a kind of punishment while adopting the Criminal Code. However, this punishment has been abolished according to the Amending Law dated 7 March 2012.

=== Classification of Punishments ===
The Code classifies the punishments into basic and additional types. The following punishments are considered only as the basic kinds of punishments: 1. public works; 2. corrective works; 3. restriction on military service; 4. maintenance in disciplinary military unit; 5. restriction of freedom; 6. imprisonment on the certain term; and 7. life imprisonment. Three types of punishments are applied only as the additional kinds of punishments: 1. deprivation of a special or military rank, honorary title or state award; 2. deprivation of the right to operate a vehicle; and 3. exclusion for limits of the Azerbaijan Republic. The penalty, and deprivation of the right to hold the certain posts or to engage in the certain activity may be applied as both basic and additional kinds of punishments.

The most severe punishment defined in the Criminal Code is life imprisonment.

== Abolition of death penalty ==
The death penalty was legally abolished in Azerbaijan in 1998. Before the adoption of the Criminal Code in 1999, the Criminal Code of Azerbaijan USSR dated 8 December 1960 was in force. Article 22 of the Code of Azerbaijan USSR regulated the death penalty. The death penalty was abolished on February 10, 1998 by Law “On Amendments and Supplements to the Criminal, Criminal Procedure and Correctional Labor Code of the Republic of Azerbaijan concerning the abolition of the death penalty in the Republic of Azerbaijan.” Additionally, on January 22, 1998, Azerbaijan acceded to the Second Optional Protocol to the International Covenant on Civil and Political Rights, aiming at the abolition of the death penalty. Following the accession, on December 11, 1998, the National Assembly passed the Law regarding the accession to the Second Optional Protocol. Finally, Azerbaijan signed Protocol No. 6 to the Convention for the Protection of Human Rights and Fundamental Freedoms concerning the Abolition of the Death Penalty on 25 January 2001, ratified it on April 15, 2002, and the Protocol entered into force in the country on 1 May 2002. Azerbaijan issued the following declaration while ratifying the Protocol: “The Republic of Azerbaijan declares that it is unable to guarantee the application of the provisions of the Protocol in the territories occupied by the Republic of Armenia until these territories are liberated from that occupation.”

== Amnesty and Pardon ==
According to the Criminal Code, amnesty acts are passed by the National Assembly of Azerbaijan. For the end of February, 2018, the National Assembly adopted the last amnesty act on May 20, 2016 on the occasion of May 28 - Republic Day. Pardon decrees are signed by President of Azerbaijan. Pardon decrees are passed about certain individuals.

== Criminal liability of legal persons ==
Only natural persons were subject to criminal liability when the Criminal Code was adopted on December 30, 1999. The Law on the Amendments to the Criminal Code dated 7 March 2012 introduced the criminal liability of legal persons. The Amendment law is not carried into force upon its adoption. The Article 2 of the Amendment Law states that the criminal liability of legal entities shall enact after the adoption of relevant amendments to the Criminal Procedure Code, and the Code on Execution of Sentences. Not all criminal sanctions under the Code may be applied to the legal persons. The Code defines certain circles of crimes (Articles 144-1, 144-2, 193-1, 194, 214, 214-1, 271–273, 308, 311, 312, 312-1, 313, 316-1 and 316-2) for which the legal persons may be subject to criminal liability. The Code specifies four kinds of punishment for the criminal acts of legal entities:

1. Fine
2. Special confiscation
3. Deprivation of right to engage in certain activities
4. Liquidation of legal entity

== Criminal liability of minors ==
The Criminal Code describes “minors” who have reached the age of 14, but under the age of 18. Generally, persons reached age of 16 at the time of commitment of a crime are subject to criminal liability. However, persons, achieved age of fourteen, are subject to criminal liability for the commitment of the following crimes: deliberate murder; deliberate causing of heavy or less heavy harm to health, kidnapping of the person, rape, violent actions of sexual nature, theft, robbery, extortion, illegal occupation of the automobile or other vehicle without the purpose of plunder, deliberate destruction or damage of property under aggravating circumstances, terrorism, capture of the hostage, hooliganism under aggravating circumstances, plunder or extortion of fire-arms, ammunition, explosives and explosives, plunder or extortion of narcotics or psychotropic substances, reduction unsuitability of vehicles or means of communication.

Under the Code, only 5 kinds of punishments may be appointed to minors:

1. penalty;
2. public works;
3. corrective works;
4. restriction of freedom;
5. imprisonment on a certain term.

== Humanization of penal policy and punishment system ==
On February 10, 2017, the presidential decree has been approved about “Improving the penitentiary system, humanization of punishment policy and enhancing the alternative punishment and procedural coercive measures.” The Decree mainly dealt with:

1. the decriminalization of crimes, in particular, in economic sphere;
2. improvement of application grounds of existing alternative sentences to imprisonment;
3. development of grounds for non-custodial measures of restraint and sentences alternative to imprisonment.

Following the Decree, the relative amendments to the Criminal Code were drafted, and submitted to the agenda of the National Assembly in October, 2017. On October 20, 2017, the National Assembly approved the amendments to the Criminal Code. The number of amendments amounted to 300. The amendments may be classified under 4 headings:

1. 15 actions have been removed from the Code, and therefore, decriminalized;
2. New kind of punishment- restriction of freedom has been introduced, and included in the sanctions of 152 Articles;
3. 4 crimes have been moved from the category of serious crimes to less serious crimes;
4. 18 crimes have been moved from the category of less serious crimes to crimes not causing great public danger.

The approved amendments to the Criminal Code entered into force on December 1, 2017. Following the amendments to the Criminal Code, the National Assembly adopted two Laws concerning the relevant amendments to the Criminal Procedure Code and Code on Execution of Punishments on December 1, 2017.

== See also ==
- Law of Azerbaijan
- Judiciary of Azerbaijan
