= Ulviyya Ali =

Azerbaijani journalist

Ulviyya Guliyeva
- Ülviyyə Quliyeva
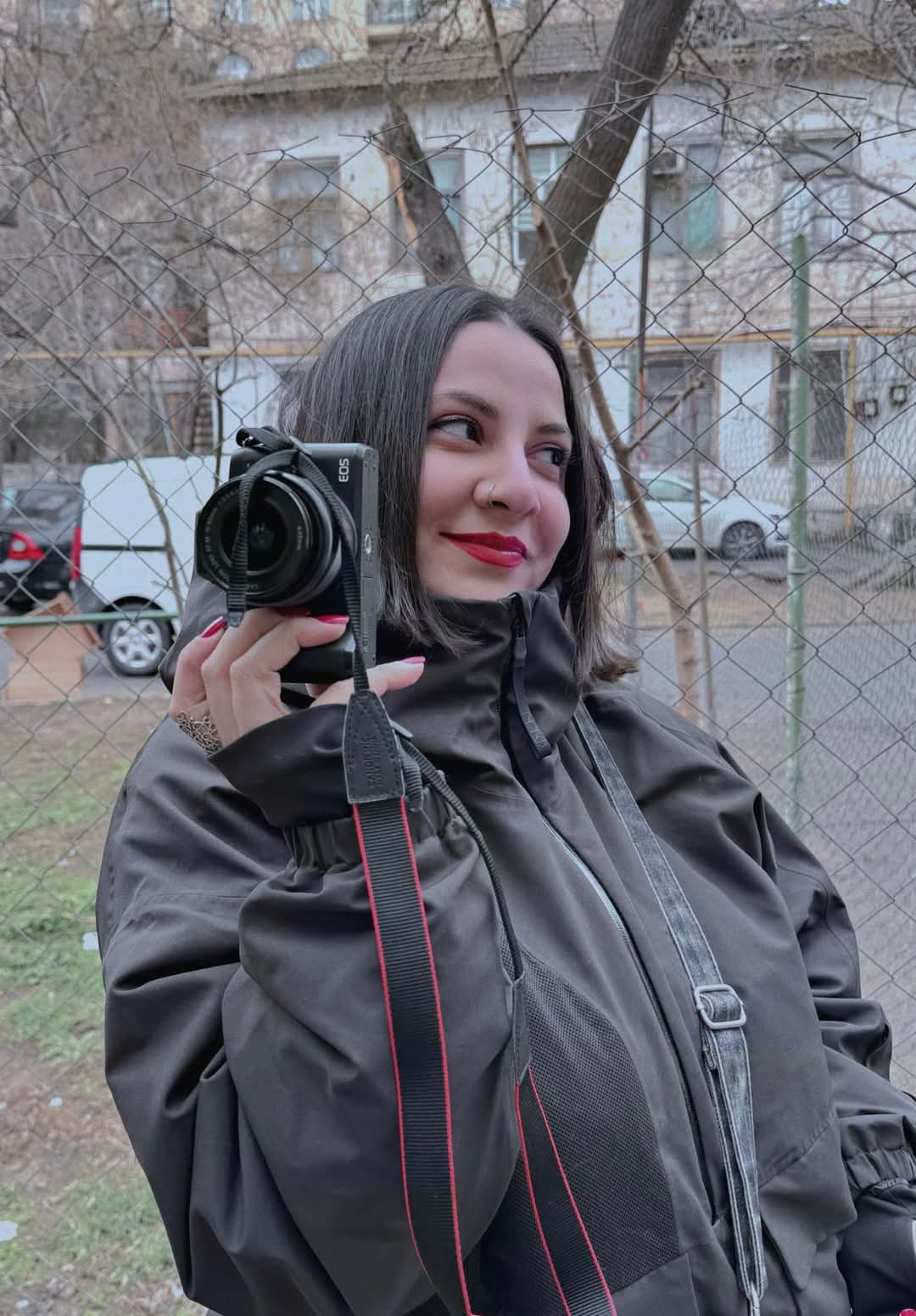
- Ulviyya Ali in 2024
- Born: October 13, 1993 (age 33); Goychay District, Azerbaijan
- Citizenship: Azerbaijan
- Occupations: journalist, human rights defender, political prisoner
- Years active: 2012–
- Organization: NIDA Civic Movement (2012–2016)
- Awards: Free Press Unlimited's "Most Resilient Journalist" (2025)
- Website: ulviyyaali.com

Ulviyya Ali gizi Guliyeva (Azerbaijani: Ülviyyə Əli qızı Quliyeva; born October 13, 1993 in Goychay) is an Azerbaijani independent journalist, human rights activist, and political prisoner. She worked as a journalist for Voice of America (VoA) from 2019 to 2025.

Since 2012, Ulviyya Ali has covered all major human rights violations occurring in Azerbaijan on her X (formerly Twitter) page, drawing the attention of international media. Her posts, as well as videos and photos authored by her, have been cited and used in reports concerning Azerbaijan in global news outlets.

In February 2025, after the accreditation of Voice of America correspondents was revoked in Azerbaijan, Ali declared that she would continue her journalistic work independently. Despite the lack of a media platform to publish her work, she began sharing her reports on her personal Facebook page and remained active in journalism.

Three months later, during the night of May 6 to 7, 2025, Ali was detained in connection with the "Meydan TV case" and was placed in pre-trial detention by a ruling of the Khatai District Court on May 7. She and others arrested in the same case were charged under Article 206.3.2 of the Criminal Code of Azerbaijan (smuggling on preliminary arrangement by group of persons). Ali denied the charges, stating she was not affiliated with Meydan TV and had made this clear four months before her arrest. She considers her detention to be linked solely to her journalistic activities.

Several local and international human rights organizations have condemned her arrest as politically motivated and have called on the Azerbaijani authorities to release her immediately.

She is currently being held at the Baku Pre-Trial Detention Center under the authority of the Ministry of Justice’s Penitentiary Service.

== Life ==
Ulviyya Ali gizi Guliyeva was born on October 13, 1993, in the Goychay District of Azerbaijan. Shortly after her birth, her family moved to Baku and later relocated to Tambov, Russia, where she spent her early childhood. She lived in Russia until the age of eight. In June 2001, the family returned to Azerbaijan.

=== Political activism ===
Ulviyya Ali became involved in socio-political activism at the age of 17. From 2012 to 2016, she was a member of the NIDA Civic Movement, during which time she was twice elected to the movement’s Supervisory and Inspection Committee. She actively participated in public campaigns in support of NIDA members who were imprisoned and led the campaign titled "Support unlawfully detained NIDA activists!"

Ali took part in numerous protests and faced police resistance on several occasions. On January 26, 2013, she was detained by police during the "Disarm the Police!" rally and was released after receiving an administrative warning.

In the 2015 parliamentary elections, she served as an authorized representative of Ramin Huseynov, a candidate from the NIDA Civic Movement running in Electoral District No. 18 (Narimanov-Nizami). In the 2020 parliamentary elections, she was the head of the campaign team for Toghrul Valiyev, a candidate representing the "Hərəkət" election bloc in Electoral District No. 23 (Nasimi-Sabail).

== Career ==
=== As a human rights defender ===
Since 2012, Ulviyya Ali has covered all major human rights violations occurring in Azerbaijan on her X (formerly Twitter) page, drawing the attention of international media. Her posts, as well as videos and photos authored by her, have been cited and used in reports concerning Azerbaijan in global news outlets.

Since 2013, Ulviyya Ali has monitored numerous court hearings involving political prisoners and has reported on courtroom developments.

She has also observed and documented electoral violations during the presidential elections of 2013, 2018, and 2024; the parliamentary elections of 2015, 2020, and 2024; the municipal elections of 2014, 2019, and 2025; and the 2016 constitutional referendum.

In 2014, she worked as an assistant to lawyer Namizad Safarov.

Since 2015, she has been a member of the jury panel for the "Nargiz" Award.

In 2017, Ali graduated with high marks from the "Young Human Rights Defenders" training program organized by the Institute for Democratic Initiatives (IDI).

She has collaborated with several non-governmental organizations, including the Election Monitoring and Democracy Studies Center (SMDT), the "Benefisiar" Legal Aid Center, and the "For Women" initiative group.

In 2018, she co-authored the report "Crimea: Breaking the Wall of Silence," published by the Human Rights Houses Foundation. That same year, she visited Crimea together with Belarusian and Ukrainian human rights defenders to prepare the report.

In 2019, Ali participated in the International Visitor Leadership Program (IVLP) in the United States.

In 2024, one of her photographs was featured in the Human Rights House Foundation's (HRHF) "Portraits of Power" photo exhibition. The subject of the photograph was Rovshana Rahimova, a prominent Azerbaijani human rights lawyer and one of the exhibition's featured figures.

Ulviyya Ali gave interviews to foreign media, particularly in the lead-up to the UN Climate Change Conference (COP29) in Baku, aiming to draw attention to human rights issues in the country, the state of independent media, and the arrests of journalists.

=== Journalistic activity ===
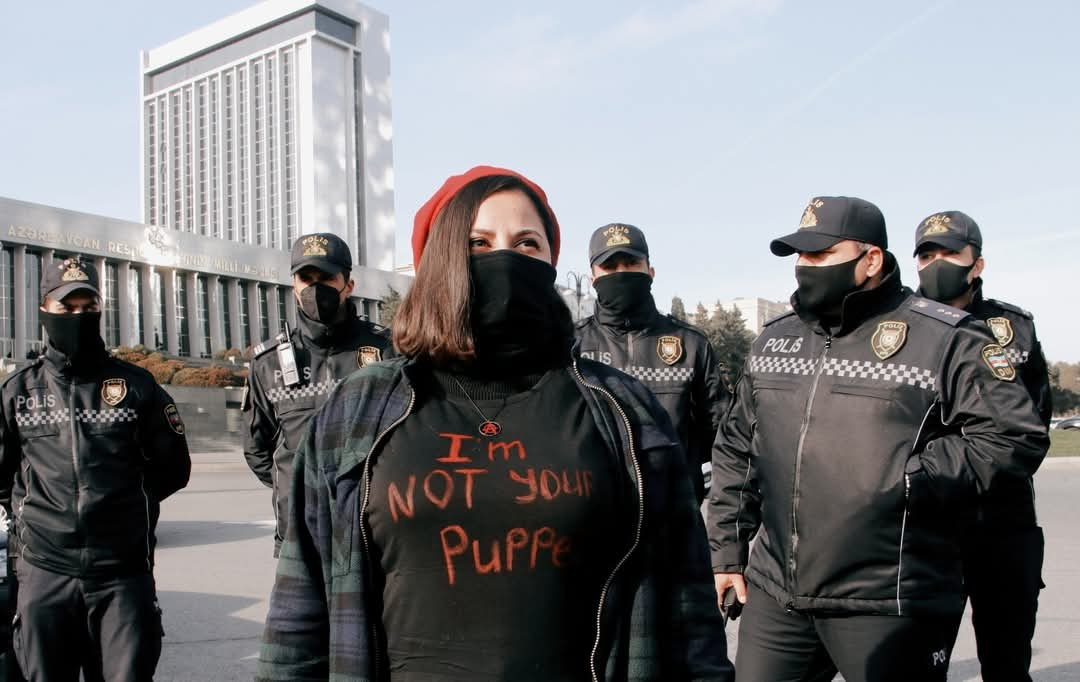
In December 2021, Ulviyya Ali protested against the Azerbaijani government's new draft law “On Media” by wearing a T-shirt with the slogan “I'm not your puppet” during a demonstration.

Since 2016, Ulviyya Ali has been active in the field of journalism. Over the years, she has collaborated with several prominent media outlets, including Radio Free Europe/Radio Liberty (RFE/RL) Azerbaijani Service, Toplum TV, Fakt Yoxla, Mikroskop Media, Voice of America (VoA), OC Media, and JAMnews.

Throughout her career, she has also contributed content to Fem-Utopia, a platform aimed at producing educational feminist content in Azerbaijani, and Qıy Vaar!, a queer-feminist news outlet. Her reporting has covered topics such as human rights, social justice, LGBTQ+ rights, women's rights, and peacebuilding efforts. In 2021, she received the QueeRadar Award for her active role in covering incidents related to the LGBTQ+ community in Azerbaijan. She has also conducted training sessions on responsible reporting, including workshops titled "How to Report on LGBTQ+ Citizens?".

Between 2019 and 2025, she worked with the Azerbaijani Service of Voice of America, where she authored and broadcast over 1000 news-pieces and reports. Her work often focused on politically sensitive topics such as political trials, human rights violations, protests, rallies, and civil disobedience actions. During her journalistic activities, she faced multiple instances of detention, police obstruction, and ill-treatment.

On 11 February 2020, while covering a protest by parliamentary candidates in front of the Central Election Commission (CEC), Ali was detained along with fellow journalists Sevinj Vagifgizi, Nargiz Absalamova, and Aygun Rashid. She sustained minor physical injuries due to police violence. Reporters Without Borders condemned the incident and accused the Azerbaijani authorities of stifling pluralism.

On 14 September 2020, while covering a protest titled "Freedom for Tofig Yagublu!" near Ganjlik metro station, Ali and her colleague Aysel Umudova were detained and pressured to delete their footage. They refused and were released shortly afterward.

On 13 October 2020, while interviewing activist Giyas Ibrahimov—who had been summoned to the Prosecutor General's Office—Ali, alongside journalist Nargiz Absalamova and Ibrahimov himself, was detained. They were held for over an hour at Police Station No. 26 in Yasamal District before being released.

On 4 August 2021, during a protest in front of the Khazar District Police Department over the femicide of S. Maharramova, Ali was detained along with journalists Elnara Gasimova and Nargiz Absalamova. She was reportedly subjected to mistreatment during and after the arrest. Her camera was damaged, and she was insulted while in custody. Although complaints were submitted to relevant authorities, no action was taken.

In February 2023, she was among 40 journalists who signed a position paper criticizing the Media Law of Azerbaijan—particularly its provisions for a centralized registry—for enabling widespread restrictions on press freedom. Following this, Ali founded the "Registry-Free Media" platform and covered journalists’ protests against the law.

In February 2025, after Voice of America journalist's accreditations in Azerbaijan were revoked, Ali publicly stated that she would continue her work independently, even without institutional support. Since then, she had been sharing her reports via her personal Facebook page, maintaining her journalistic presence despite increasing restrictions.

== Detention and arrest ==
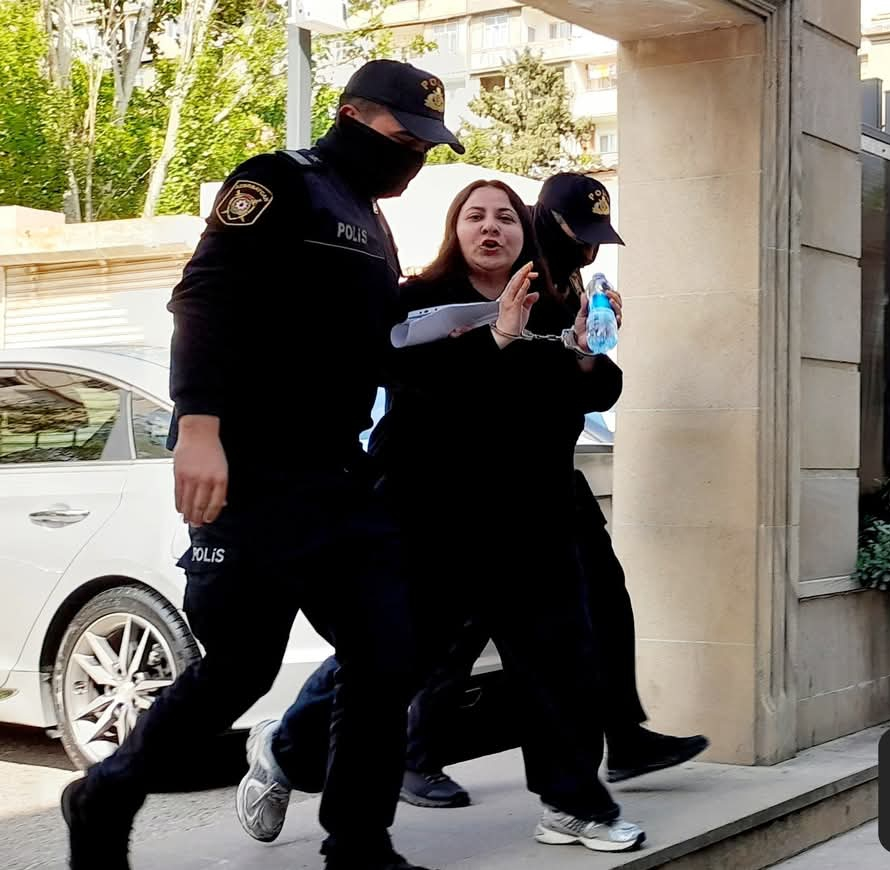
When Ulviyya Ali was brought to court, she raised her handcuffed wrists and loudly declared: "The hands of the media are shackled!"

Ulviyya Ali was summoned to the Baku City Police Department by investigator Samir Ismayilov on January 15, 2025, to testify as a witness on January 16, 2025. In an interview, Ulviyya Ali stated that she was interrogated for about two hours in connection with the “Meydan TV” case. Afterwards, without any explanation, she was banned from leaving Azerbaijan. She also emphasized that she was not a journalist with “Meydan TV” but a correspondent for Voice of America, and even if she had worked for Meydan TV, it would not constitute a crime.

The Women's Press Freedom Coalition (WPF) condemned the Azerbaijani government’s decision to bar Ulviyya Ali from leaving the country. In January, Ulviyya Ali filed a legal complaint regarding the travel ban. The case began on March 18 in Baku’s Khatai District Court, but the judge postponed the hearing until April, citing the need for the police investigator to be present. According to the Azerbaijani Migration Code, a witness cannot be subjected to a travel ban — such restrictions apply only to defendants, Ali noted. She also said the ban was unjustified, as it had only been communicated to her orally. Ali mentioned that she had sent three official requests to the Baku police asking for written documentation of the travel ban, but her requests were "ignored". On April 11, the Khatai District Court rejected her complaint. According to her, Farid Shukurlu, an investigator with the Baku City Police Department, claimed that the investigation contained "important information" implicating other individuals under ongoing inquiry. Thus, a travel ban was applied to these individuals — still considered witnesses — as well. Ali told the court that she had already been questioned as a witness and that three months had passed. She argued that if she had not collaborated with the media outlet under investigation, she could not possibly possess any “important information” relevant to the case.

During the night of May 6 to 7, 2025, around 4:00 AM, information spread across social media about Ulviyya Ali’s detention in connection with the Meydan TV case and a search of her apartment. According to her mother, Ilhama Guliyeva, Ulviyya was subjected to physical abuse and her home was ransacked during the search: “My daughter has an adenoma in her head, and a police officer hit her on the head. They stormed into her house, completely wrecked the apartment. The police confiscated her personal belongings, took her computer, and ‘found’ over 6,000 euros in cash.” On May 7, Ulviyya Ali was formally charged under Article 206.3.2 of Azerbaijan’s Criminal Code (smuggling committed by a group of persons by prior agreement). Judge Sulhana Gadjieva of the Khatai District Court imposed a pretrial detention measure of 1 month and 29 days. When Ulviyya Ali was brought to court, she again raised her handcuffed wrists and proclaimed: “The hands of the media are shackled!” According to her lawyer, Elvin Alyamov, during the search of her apartment, police claimed to have discovered 6,000 euros. However, Ulviyya Ali insisted that the money did not belong to her and had been planted by the police. She also reported being subjected to mistreatment during her detention: “At the police station, they demanded her phone password, and when she refused, they struck her on the head multiple times,” Alyamov said. In a comment to DOXA, women’s rights advocate Gulnara Mehdiyeva stated that Ulviyya Ali was beaten for several hours by security officers after her arrest. “Multiple blows to the head, two female officers pulled her by the hair, and one officer said: ‘I will destroy your womanhood’ — which can be regarded as a threat of sexual violence,” Mehdiyeva reported.

Prior to her arrest, Ulviyya Ali had left a letter in which she warned of the possibility of being detained.

“If you are reading this article, it means I have been slandered and unlawfully arrested for my journalistic work. Like my fellow journalists, I have committed no crime — I did not bring into the country what they are calling ‘illegal funding,’ nor have I committed any other offence. I also have no business ties to Meydan TV. And even if I did, cooperating with Meydan TV is not a crime. I should also note that I have long collaborated with Voice of America.

You all know that the Azerbaijani state is intolerant of independent media. As a result of this intolerance, more than 20 journalists are currently in prison — and I am one of them. Since 2016, I have always tried to remain committed to professional ethics in my journalistic work and have done everything possible to highlight the problems of anyone who has faced injustice, regardless of their religion, ethnicity, political views, gender, orientation, or social status. Now, like my fellow colleagues behind bars, I will continue this work.

Our voice will always break the silence in the face of political will that seeks to silence Azerbaijan. This may be the last post I write in freedom. But I believe that a righteous voice cannot be silenced.”

— Ulviyya Ali's letter before arrest

On May 10, reports emerged indicating that Ulviyya Ali was in poor condition in the pretrial detention center. After being subjected to violence by police at the Baku City Police Department, during which she sustained multiple blows to the head, Ali reportedly vomited twice while held in the temporary detention facility of the Khatai District Police Department, and once in the Baku pretrial detention center. It was reported that since 2017, she had a tumor (adenoma) in her head. Ulviyya Ali filed a complaint with the Republican Prosecutor's Office regarding the police violence. She also requested a comprehensive medical examination, including an MRI scan, to determine whether she had sustained internal injuries that would require her transfer to a facility equipped with the necessary medical equipment and staff. However, none of her requests were fulfilled.

Ulviyya Ali filed an appeal against the May 7, 2025 decision of the Khatai District Court. On May 16, during a hearing at the Baku Court of Appeal presided over by Judge Elman Ragimov, Ulviyya Ali's appeal was denied, and the measure of pretrial detention was upheld. In court, Ulviyya Ali emphasized her health issues, rejected all charges against her, and asserted that her arrest was directly related to her journalistic activities.

=== Reactions to the arrest ===
A number of local and international human rights organizations condemned the arrest of Ulviyya Ali, calling it political, and urged the Azerbaijani authorities to release her immediately.

On May 8, the International Federation of Journalists (IFJ) and the European Federation of Journalists (EFJ) issued a joint statement condemning her arrest as politically motivated and called on the Azerbaijani authorities to release her immediately.

The Human Rights House Foundation (HRHF) also strongly condemned the detention and mistreatment of Ulviyya Ali, expressed solidarity, and demanded her immediate and unconditional release.

The Committee to Protect Journalists (CPJ) called Ulviyya Ali’s arrest "a step by the Azerbaijani authorities to eliminate any trace of independent journalism," urging her immediate release and a prompt investigation into disturbing allegations of police abuse.

The International Freedom of Expression Exchange (IFEX) joined local and international organizations in calling for the immediate release of Ulviyya Ali and all other imprisoned journalists in Azerbaijan. IFEX condemned the use of physical violence, smear campaigns, and politically motivated charges as tools of intimidation and media repression.

The Council of Europe's Media Freedom and the NGO Freedom Now expressed concern over Ulviyya Ali’s arrest and the rising number of detained independent journalists in Azerbaijan.

The International Women's Media Foundation (IWMF) emphasized that "reporting on injustice is not a crime" and also called for Ulviyya Ali’s release.

On May 12, the international human rights organization Front Line Defenders issued a statement outlining five demands to the Azerbaijani authorities concerning Ulviyya Ali:

- Immediately and unconditionally release Ulviyya Ali and ensure her physical and psychological safety;
- Grant her access to independent medical care;
- Drop all charges against the human rights defender and journalist;
- Conduct an immediate, thorough, and impartial investigation into the allegations of physical abuse against her, publish the findings, and hold those responsible accountable in accordance with international standards;
- Ensure under all circumstances that Ulviyya Ali can carry out her legitimate human rights work in Azerbaijan.

According to human rights defender Emin Huseynov, following the expulsion of AbzasMedia and Toplum TV from the country and the closure of Turan Information Agency, Ulviyya Ali became the only remaining source of independent journalism in Azerbaijan. According to journalist Arzu Geybullayeva, Ulviyya Ali was targeted because she was one of the few remaining reporters still working in the country. On May 16, a member United States House of Representatives Jamie Raskin, expressed his solidarity with Ulviyya Ali on his official X microblog, voicing his support for all journalists like her who are resisting authoritarian regimes, dictators, kleptocrats, and the censorship of police states.

== Filmography ==
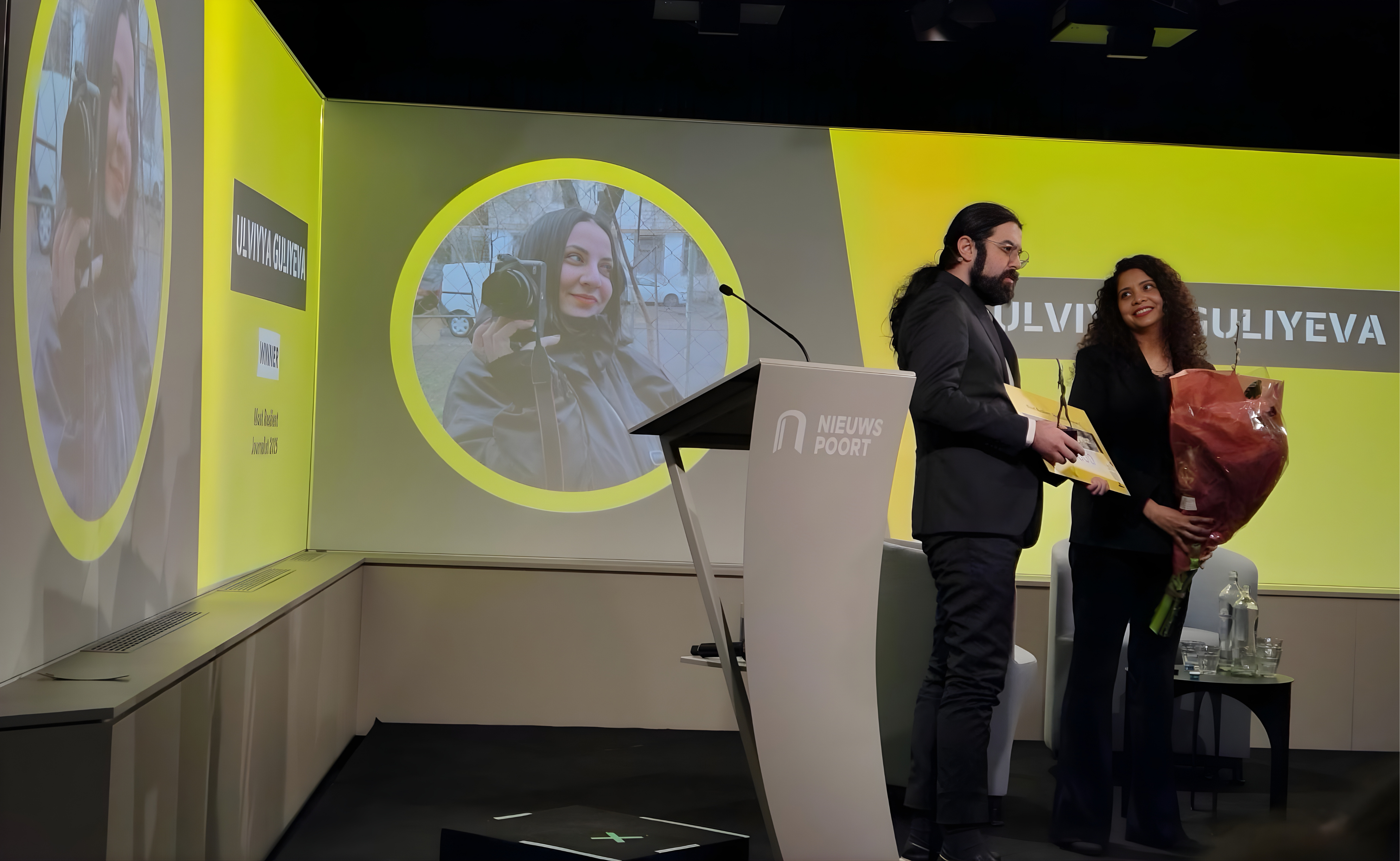
The 2025 Free Press Awards by Free Press Unlimited, presented by Rana Ayyub to Ulviyya Ali, represented by her friend Javid Agha (February 3, 2026)

Ulviyya Ali is an author of several short films.

- In 2019, Ulviyya Ali was the creator and project lead of the short film "Yadlar" ("Strangers"), which depicted the persecution and arrests of LGBT individuals in Azerbaijan, specifically the events of 2017.
- In 2021, she authored a short film titled “Our Lives After the War: Azerbaijan After the Second Karabakh War.” The film explores the changes in the lives of Azerbaijani families following the Second Karabakh War between Azerbaijan and Armenia in 2020, which claimed the lives of more than seven thousand people.
- In 2022, she authored the short film "How Do Young People See Themselves in Azerbaijan?", which explores differing perspectives of youth on themes such as patriotism, "traditional values," war, and peace.
- That same year, she also authored "I’m Signing My Success", a short film addressing the barriers women face when entering the labor market and emphasizing the importance of economic independence.
- In 2023, she wrote the short film "Slave Market – The Story of an Unemployed Man", which focuses on the experience of a jobless man working in a so-called "slave market." The film highlights widespread unemployment and poor regional economic development, challenging the persistent myth of the capital city as a land of opportunity.
- Life in a Loop (Döngü) is a short film that follows the years of repression and resistance in the life of Azerbaijani politician Tofig Yagublu and includes footage shot by Ulviyya Ali over the past 5 years. Trailer was published on February 5, Yagublu's 65th birthday.

== Awards ==
- In February 2026, Ulviyya Ali was awarded the "Most Resilient Journalist" award at the 2025 Free Press Awards ceremony, organized by Free Press Unlimited (FPU). The award was presented to Javid Agha at an event held in The Hague, Netherlands, on February 3, 2026.

== See also ==
- Fatima Movlamli
- Media freedom in Azerbaijan
