= Media freedom in Azerbaijan =

Media freedom in Azerbaijan is severely curtailed. Most Azerbaijanis receive their information from mainstream television, which is unswervingly pro-government and under strict government control. According to a 2012 report of the NGO "Institute for Reporters' Freedom and Safety (IRFS)" Azerbaijani citizens are unable to access objective and reliable news on human rights issues relevant to Azerbaijan and the population is under-informed about matters of public interest.

Reporters without Borders ranks Azerbaijan at the 167th place (between Egypt and Bahrain) out of over 180 countries on the Press Freedom Index, with a score of 58.48. Freedom House ranks Azerbaijan as "Not Free". In 2015, Azerbaijan had the largest number of journalists imprisoned in Europe and Central Asia. Independent journalists have been imprisoned. Azerbaijani authorities have a track record of prosecuting and convicting Azerbaijani exiles in absentia in sham trials for posting online commentary criticizing the Azerbaijani government.

The authoritarian Aliyev regime in Azerbaijan use a range of measures to restrict media freedom within the country. Opposition and independent media outlets and journalists have their access to print-houses and distribution networks limited, or can find themselves facing defamation charges and crippling fines and are subject to intimidation tactics, including imprisonment on fabricated charges. The government restricts public access to information about the owners and shareholders of Azerbaijani companies.

== Background ==
In recent years, the government has increased its control over internet and harassment of internet activists and bloggers. Media freedom groups have expressed particular concern about the government's surveillance of journalists' internet and telephone communications.

The crackdown on journalists is accompanied by the intimidation and arrest of freedom of expression and human rights activists, such as Intigam Aliyev, Rasul Jafarov and Leyle Yunus who were arrested in 2014. Many of them had to leave the country out of concern for their safety. Assaults on journalists and activists are rarely prosecuted. This is not true for the proceedings issued against journalists that are object of political motivated criminal proceedings carried out in order to influence and hinder their work under pretexts. As a consequence of such an environment, self-censorship is widespread among Azerbaijani journalists.

The majority of print and broadcast media are controlled by the government and its allies. In some cases media outlets are controlled through nominal intermediaries. The lack of laws on transparency of media ownership makes it difficult to identify the true owners of media outlets. The few independent media outlets are struggling to survive. Most journalists work without contracts and social security, and receive irregular salaries.

== Attacks and threats against journalists ==
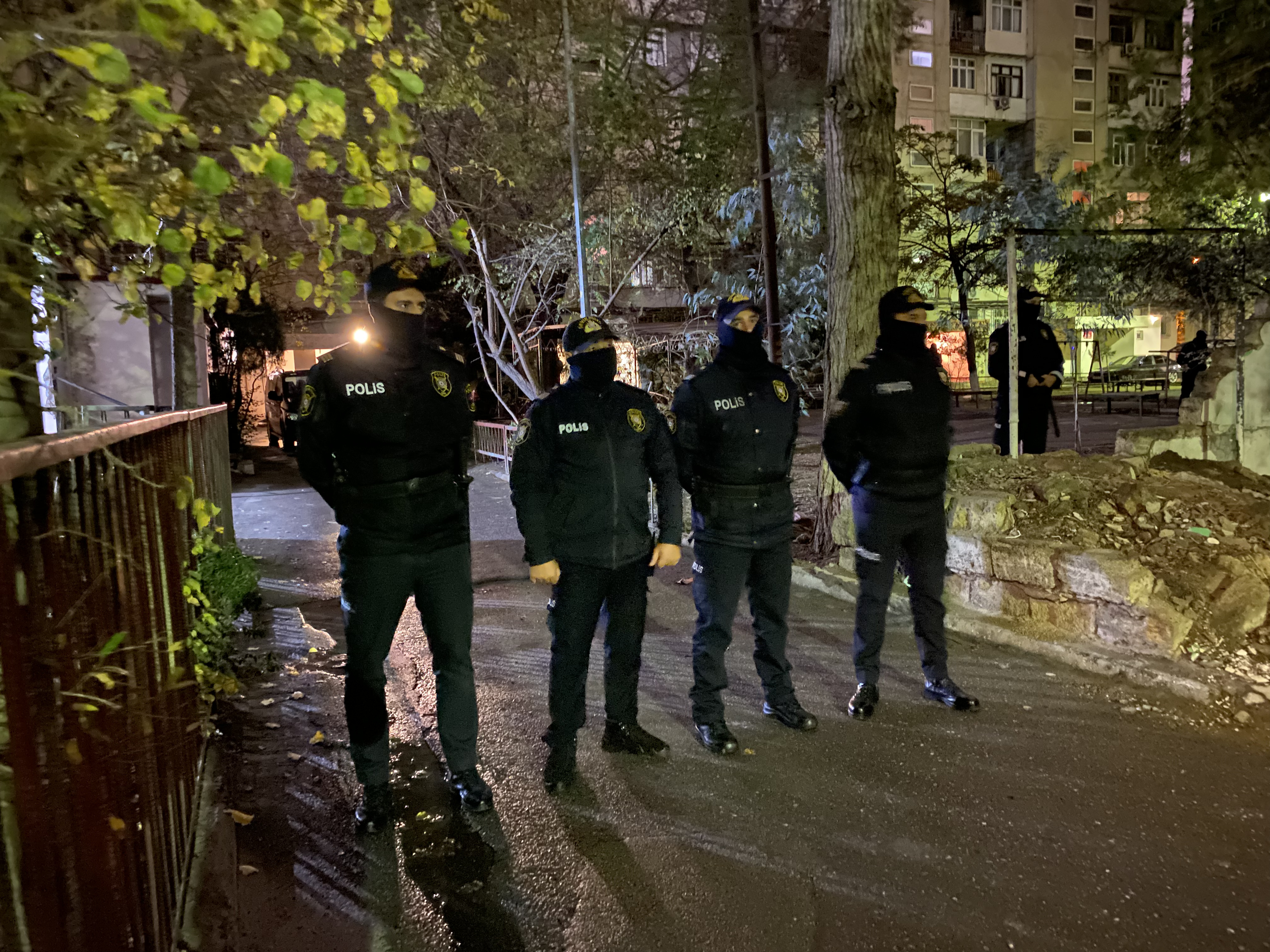
Police outside Sevinj Vagifgizi's house during a search of her apartment, 21 November 2023

Threats, physical attacks, harassment against journalists are common. Nearly 100 journalists were victims of physical assault in 2003. More than 50 were attacked covering violent clashes between the security forces and demonstrators after the 2003 presidential elections. The International Federation of Journalists recorded 15 attacks on journalists in 2013.

- Two opposition journalists were attacked in July 2004. Aydin Guliyev, editor of the opposition daily Baki Khaber, was abducted and beaten by men that accused him of "not serving his country and Islam" and warned him to stop all journalistic work on 17 July 2004.
- Elmar Huseynov, editor-in-chief of the opposition weekly Monitor, was shot dead in 2005, but there has been no prosecution of his murderers. On the 10th anniversary of his assassination, the OSCE RFoM called for an end to impunity.
- In 2011 the journalists and writer Rafiq Tağı was murdered. Nobody was charged for the homicide.
- In November 2012 the journalists Farahim Ilgaroglu (Yeni Musafat), Etimad Budagov (Turan Information Agency), Amid Suleymanov (Media Forum) and Rasim Aliyev (IRFS) were beaten and arrested by police while covering an opposition rally in Baku, despite being clearly identifiable as members of the press.
- On 25 April 2014 the Yeni Musafat reporter Farahim Ilgaroglu was attacked outside his home in Baku.
- In August 2014, the independent journalist Ilgar Nasibov was beaten in his office in the Nakhchivan exclave. He lost vision from one eye.
- Rasim Aliyev, freelance reported and chairman of the media monitoring group Institute for Reporters' Freedom and Safety (IRFS) was brutally beaten by multiple people in Baku on 8 August. He died the following days from injuries caused by the attack. The OSCE RFoM protested with the authorities and called upon them to reverse the rapidly deteriorating media freedom situation in Azerbaijan.
- In November 2015 journalists of ITV and ATV channels were attacked during a police raid against alleged Islamic radicals in the village of Nardaran, on the outskirts of Baku. The OSCE RFoM protested with the authorities.
- In January 2016 Gunay Ismayilova, a media lawyer and deputy chair of the Institute for Reporter's Freedom and Safety (IRFS) was physically attacked at the entrance of her home in Baku, without suffering serious injuries thanks to the intervention of neighbours.
- On 30 May 2024, Farid Mehralizada, an economist and journalist for Radio Free Europe/Radio Liberty (RFE/RL)’s Azerbaijani Service, was unjustly detained outside a metro station by masked men. The Azerbaijani Government has charged Farid with "conspiracy to smuggle foreign currency" and “illegal entrepreneurship, money laundering, tax evasion, and document forgery.” If convicted, he could face up to 12 years in prison. On 24 October 2024, the European Parliament adopted a resolution denouncing human rights violations in Azerbaijan and calling for the release of Mehralizada and other political prisoners.

Other legislative measures - from hooliganism to the possession of drugs and weapons, treason, and tax evasion - are regularly used by authorities to punish and prevent critical reporting.

== Unfair trials and imprisoned journalists ==
Journalists arrested in Azerbaijan (2023–2025):
Aytaj Tapdig	Aysel Umudova	Nargiz Absalamova
Khayala Aghayeva	Ulviyya Ali	Elnara Gasimova
Aynur Elgunesh	Ramin Deko	Hafiz Babali
Sevinj Vagifgizi	Natig Javadli	Shamshad Agha
Nurlan Libre	Farid Ismayilov	Fatima Movlamli

Azerbaijani authorities have imprisoned several notable journalists. The Committee to Protect Journalists has stated the charges against many journalists are "fabricated" and "politicized". At the end of 2014, eight journalists remained behind bars. International instances such as the Human Rights Commissioner of the Council of Europe have consistently refuted the justifications by the Azerbaijani authorities that jailed journalists had been prosecuted and sentenced for common crimes. Prison conditions for journalists are reported as dire, with routine ill-treatment and denial of medical care. More than 10 journalists remain in jail in Azerbaijan by the end of 2015. They include:

- Seymur Hazi, a columnist for the newspaper Azadliq, on a charge of hooliganism;

The full list of cases of imprisoned journalists in the last years is the following:

- In August 2011, authorities imprisoned Ramin Bayramov, the editor of the Islamic news website Islam-Azeri.az. His news website has previously criticized the government of Azerbaijan. Azerbaijani authorities first charged Bayramov with "activities hostile to the country" and "incitement to mass disorder." After failing to prove those charges, the authorities then charged him with drugs and weapons possession. The Azerbaijan Department of Homeland Security said it found arms and drugs in his garage, but Bayramov said those were planted there.
- In February 2012, police arrested Anar Bayramli, a journalist for Iranian television, on a charge of heroin possession. The charge was described by several human rights organizations as fabricated for political reasons.
- In November 2013 online activist Abdul Abilov was arrested on dubious charges of drugs trafficking.
- In April 2014, prominent human rights defenders Leyla Yunus, at the head of Institute for Peace and Democracy, and her husband Arif Yunus were detained by the authorities for allegedly spying for Armenia. Leyla Yunus has been sentenced to three months of pretrial detention, and her husband Arif has separately been jailed. The detention of the Yunus has raised big international outcry. Prominent international organizations such as Amnesty International, Parliamentary Assembly of the Council of Europe, United States Mission to the OSCE, Observatory for the Protection of Human Rights Defenders, Nobel Women's Initiative, Reporters Without Borders, Human Rights Watch and others have harshly condemned their detention as another step in the state crackdown on civil society in Azerbaijan and called for their immediate release.
- In August 2014 Seymur Hezi, critical reporter of Azadliq was arrested under charges of hooliganism.
- In August 2014 human rights defenders Intiqam Aliyev, head of Legal Education Society, and Rasul Jafarov, head of Human Rights Club, were arrested and the working of these two organizations were impeded.

According to Reporters Without Borders, President Ilham Aliyev launched “a new wave of fierce repression against the country’s last remaining journalists” in late 2023. Journalists from the independent Abzas Media, Toplum TV, and Meydan TV were prosecuted in 2024 and 2025 in trials that international human rights organizations described as unfair. Meydan TV's entire newsroom staff was detained in December 2024.

On 20 June 2025, seven journalists from Abzas Media and Radio Free Europe/Radio Liberty (RFE/RL) were sentenced to long prison sentences in Azerbaijan. Abzas Media's director Ulvi Hasanli, editor-in-chief Sevinj Vagifgizi and investigative reporter Hafiz Babali were sentenced to nine years in prison. Journalists Nargiz Absalamova and Elnara Gasimova were sentenced to eight years in prison, while the outlet's deputy director Mahammad Kekalov was sentenced to seven and a half years. Independent economist Farid Mehralizade, who gave interviews to Abzas Media, was sentenced to 9 years in prison.

Marie Struthers, Amnesty International’s Eastern Europe and Central Asia Director, said: "By pressing fabricated economic charges against journalists who exposed high-level corruption, the Azerbaijani authorities are sending a chilling message to anyone in the country who dares to challenge them. ... The political repression in Azerbaijan today is staggering, yet we lack a united, principled stand against it from the international community, in defence of human rights. In stark contrast, major actors like the European Union persist in actively courting President Ilham Aliyev in search of lucrative gas deals."

== Refusal of access and arbitrary expulsions ==
A number of foreign journalists have also been refused entry to Azerbaijan or have been expelled from the country for reporting unfavorably on domestic and foreign matters.

- In June 2011, Diana Markosian, a freelance photographer for Bloomberg Markets magazine who holds dual US-Russian citizenship, was denied entry by Azerbaijani border officials at Heydar Aliyev International Airport in Baku because she was Armenian.
- In the same month, a journalist for the New York Times was told that he would not be issued a visa until he could explain why there was so much "negative information" about Azerbaijan in the United States.
- In April 2011, a Swedish TV news crew was arrested and sent back to the airport after covering a demonstration by opposition protesters.
- The Embassy of Azerbaijan to Italy publishes online a black list of personae non gratae and uses it to punish journalists who visit the Armenian-occupied territories of Nagorno Karabakh

== Political interferences ==
The president Ilham Aliyev and his party control most of media and informations, despite the official 1998 ban on censorship. Political parties use economic pressure to control the media, mostly through advertisement.

- After a week of harassments the Institute for Reporters' Freedom and Safety (IRFS) and the Media Rights Institute were forced to fled the country in August 2014. Obyektiv TV, the TV program of IRFS, was showing stories about freedom of expression and human rights. In the same days the International Research and Exchanges Board (IREX), who was supporting independent media, had to close his office.
- In December 2014 the Baku office of Radio Free Europe/Radio Liberty was closed down by the authorities following a trumped-up criminal case. RFE/RL journalists were individually targeted, taken from homes for police questioning.
- In 2025, Azerbaijan ordered the closure of the BBC office in the country. The Azerbaijani government mentioned that similar measures had been taken against other foreign media organizations.

Reporters Without Borders has called on the Parliamentary Assembly of the Council of Europe (PACE) to firmly condemn Azerbaijan for tolerating escalating press freedom violations.

Activists such as Sing For Democracy and Amnesty International brought up the issues of Azerbaijan's rights as it hosted the 2012 Eurovision Song Contest, after the song Running Scared by duet Ell and Nikki won the 2011 contest (these activists described its title as ironic.) The issues included harassment of journalists, and the organisations met with the EBU on 1 May 2012 to discuss the problems.

== Defamation lawsuits ==
Defamation is a criminal offense punishable by up to three years in prison. At the same time journalists that damage the honor and the dignity of the president can be punished up to two years in prison. The government in this way can make pressure on independent journalists and opposition media. Since 2013 defamation include internet content, too.

- The newspaper Azadliq was accused several times of defamation and, after having paid high fines, stopped in July 2014 the print version due to financial problems.

== Cyber-attacks ==
In the recent years had strengthen the control on the internet activities of bloggers, social-media activists and journalists. The blogger Elsevar Mursalli was imprisoned for alleged drug possession and released in October.

In 2013 the government blocked an image-sharing website about security service. At the same time, Azadliq and RFE/RL (Radio Free Europe/Radio Liberty) reported cyber-attacks.

== Smear campaigns ==
- Since 2012 the leading investigative journalist Khadija Ismayilova of Radio Free Europe had been a frequent target of harassment, blackmail and online smear campaigns. Ismaylova was subject to gross violation of her privacy, and secretly-recorded intimate images of her were posted online in March 2013 in an attempt to discredit her. She called upon the European Court of Human Rights to order Azerbaijani authorities to protect her from threats and violences in October 2013. In 2014 she was tried and imprisoned.
- Azeri journalist and human rights activist Arzu Geybullayeva has received numerous threats in various social media circles stemming from Azerbaijan over her cooperation with the Armenian newspaper Agos. Arzu Geybullayeva, freelance journalist (video) In an interview with Global Voices, she stated that she branded as a "traitor" and that the blackmail escalated into death threats towards her and her family. The threats have caused her to refrain from visiting her native Azerbaijan in a self-imposed exile in Turkey. The threats were largely condemned by numerous international organizations including PEN International and its affiliates English PEN and PEN Center USA. PEN has called upon the Azerbaijani and Turkish government to "ensure her safety and to investigate all threats of violence made against her." The Index on Censorship has also condemned the threats and has called upon the "international community to put pressure on Azerbaijan to respect freedom of expression."

== Internet censorship and surveillance ==
The Azerbaijani government has increased its control over the internet, harassing social media activists, bloggers and online journalists. The email and telephone communications of journalists have been denounced as under surveillance. Real-life intimidations are used to deter online criticism, rather than content blocking. Legal norms criminalising online defamation have deterred social media mobilisation too, together with the arrests of bloggers and activists. DDoS attacks against independent outlets such as Azadliq and RFE/RL have been reported. Some websites are simply blocked, such as 24saat.org, xural.com, and monitortv.info.

On 3 March 2017, Mehman Huseynov, popular video blogger and activist, was arrested in the courtroom of Suraxanı raion court of Baku and sentenced to two years imprisonment on charges of defamation. Huseynov is well known for his investigative journalism, focused on corruption among the Azerbaijani elite. Most recently, he had posted pictures online of luxury properties, which he said were owned by government officials. He has long been subject to pressure by the authorities, and has been under a travel ban for several years.

== Transparency of media ownership ==
Transparency of media ownership refers to the public availability of accurate, comprehensive and up-to-date information about media ownership structures. A legal regime guaranteeing transparency of media ownership makes possible for the public as well as for media authorities to find out who effectively owns, controls and influences the media as well as media influence on political parties or state bodies.

The Law on Mass Media provides that print media ownership must be disclosed publicly. However, the law does not regulate transparency of media's financial resources and flows. This is a particularly concerning point in a country where, according to some experts, the state and one single oligarch owns more than 90 percent of the country's media.

Overall, according to Access-Info Europe, an NGO advocating for enhancing access to information, the legislative framework for transparency is vague and requires little ownership information to be disclosed.

As a consequence, in practice it is difficult to obtain comprehensive information on the ownership structures of some media outlets, in particular private broadcasters. In fact, in June 2012, some amendments to the Law on the Registration of Legal Entities, on Commercial Secrecy and the Law on Obtaining of Information further worsened the transparency situation since information about corporate owners and their shareholdings of private media have been declared commercial secrets and deleted from public websites and registers. This makes it possible for members of Parliament and other public officials that are banned from owning a business not accountable to public scrutiny.

There is a lack of political willingness in improving transparency of media ownership in Azerbaijan, where many media outlets, in particular print media, are controlled by persons or companies connected to the political power, from both and editorial and financial point of view. In some cases, this control is exerted through nominal intermediaries. Transparency of media ownership has been a neglected issue amid the frequent and vibrant public debates on the challenges and problems affecting media freedom in the country. Further, the practice, not the law, for broadcast media sees the government to strictly control ownership and any changes in ownership in the broadcast sector. In such a context, the media regulatory authority does not enforce sanctions without the order of the Presidential Administration.

== Access to public information ==
=== Background ===
Access to public information and freedom of information (FOI) refer to the right of access to information held by public bodies also known as "right to know". Access to public information is considered of fundamental importance for the effective functioning of democratic systems, as it enhances governments' and public officials' accountability, boosting people participation and allowing their informed participation into public life. The fundamental premise of the right of access to public information is that the information held by governmental institutions is in principle public and may be concealed only on the basis of legitimate reasons which should be detailed in the law.

The Law on Access to Information was adopted in Azerbaijan in 2005. The Law entitles citizens of Azerbaijan to send, both as individuals and legal entities, requests for information to any public institution as well as the agency in charge of managing public finance, and get the corresponding answer. It is an "ambitious information access Law", according to Revenue Watch Institute (RWI). However a monitoring report by RWI and the Open Society Institute (OSI) found that the reality of access to information fell short of the ideal. According to the research carried out, Azerbaijani officials were in poor compliance with the 2005 law - over half of the inquiries made were ignored, while the 65 inquiries that received responses included 16 refusals of information and 3 incomplete answers. Few oil companies responded to the request.

Organisation Article 19 also found that there were inadequate mechanisms to facilitate information requests from the public, and no dedicated public information offices in Ministries. In addition, their report found an entrenched culture of secrecy within Azerbaijani government institutions and a lack of awareness of the right to information among the public.

=== FOI provisions under the law ===
Under the law, responses to requests for information is due within seven days and, if necessary, no later than in 24 hours. A public authority may refuse to reply to the request only when it is not the owner of the information, the disclosure of the requested information is restricted by law, the request does not contain information for identifying the information requested, the applicant is not entitled to request such information, or when he/she has not provided information on his/her identity.

The law defines two categories of information, i.e. "public information" and "information with limited access". Two types of information fall within the definition of "information with limited access", as defined by the law: secret information (state secrets), and confidential information (proprietary, professional, commercial, investigative or judicial secrets, and personal information). Since 2012, commercial confidentiality includes also "information about founders (participants) of legal entities and their share in equity capital, and this significantly hampers journalistic anti-corruption investigations".

The law established the set up of the Commissioner for Information Issues, in charge of supervising the implementation of the law. However, over the six years that followed its establishment, the Office failed to comply with its duties. As a consequence, in 2011 the Parliament amended the relevant legislation, abandoning the idea of the Commissioner position, and instead entrusting the Ombudsman for Human Rights with the former responsibilities of the Commissioner for Information.

=== Access to public information in practice ===
Media outlets and journalists face several problems when trying to access public information. Such problems, however, are unevenly distributed as some public authorities offer complete and timely answers to FOI requests in most cases while many other institutions widely ignore journalists' requests. Some ministries make decisions to limit the access of journalists to information. Problems of access to public information are not limited to authorities' illegal refusals to respond to information requests. Indeed, journalists' right to access information are violated both by the courts and the Parliament. For instance, in 2013 there were cases of journalists to whom was impeded to cover trials even though all the hearings were open. In 2013, the Parliament impeded journalists to bring their equipment and smartphones to the meeting rooms following the episode of a video recorded by a journalist on a smartphone and published on the Internet showing MPs voting with e-cards on behalf of their colleagues.

In January 2014, the Minister of education signed a decree to forbid educational institutions, including universities, to make information public without approval from the Ministry's press service. Acting in compliance with this decree, the security service of the Baku State University impeded journalists from covering a students' protest. As a result, journalists who wanted to interview students were injured and their equipment was broken.

== See also ==
- Media of Azerbaijan
- Human rights in Azerbaijan
- List of journalists killed in Azerbaijan
