= Shamshad Agha =

Azerbaijani journalist

- Şəmşad Ağa
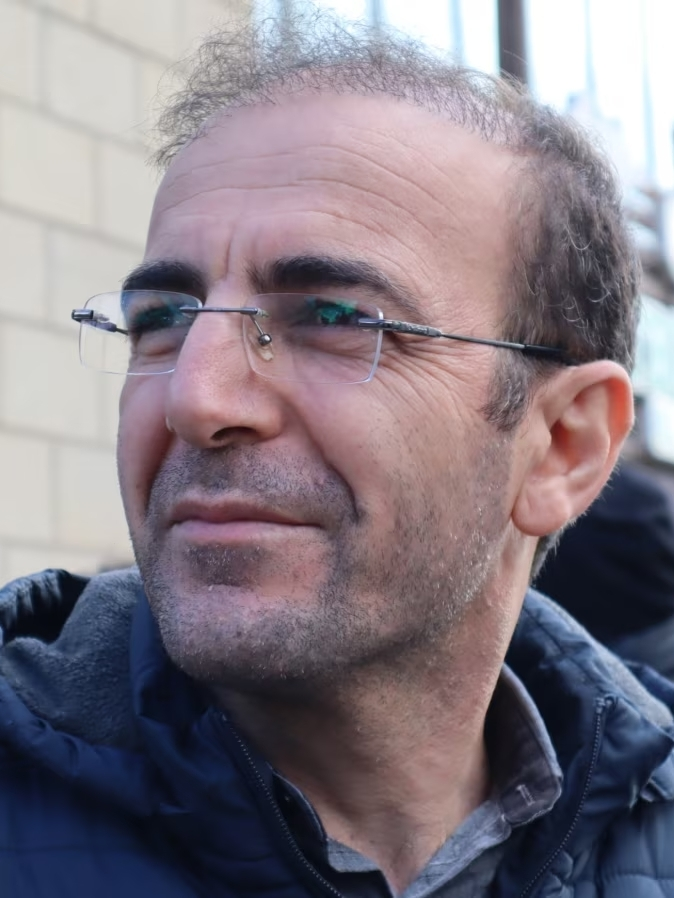
- Shamshad Agha in 2024
- Born: September 1, 1982 (age 44); Şivlə, Lerik District, Azerbaijan
- Citizenship: Azerbaijan
- Education: Lankaran State University (B)
- Occupations: journalist, political prisoner
- Years active: 2003–present

Shamshad Agha (full name: Shamshad Islam oglu Agha, Azerbaijani: Şəmşad İslam oğlu Ağa; born September 1, 1982, Lerik District, Azerbaijan SSR) is an Azerbaijani journalist and political prisoner; co-founder of Toplum TV (2016), editor-in-chief of Arqument.az (since 2018), and editor at Meydan TV (since 2022).

== Detainment ==
Shamshad Agha was detained by police on the night of February 5–6, 2025, and placed under investigation as a suspect in criminal case No. 240200039, the preliminary investigation of which was conducted by the Main Police Department of the city of Baku. He was arrested on February 6, 2025, by a decision of the Khatai District Court. Shamshad Agha and seven other journalists arrested before him were charged under Article 206.3.2 of the Criminal Code (smuggling committed by a group of persons by prior conspiracy). On August 28, 2025, the charges in the criminal case investigated by the Main Police Department of the city of Baku were aggravated. Agha and the other persons arrested in this case were charged under eight articles of the Criminal Code. The defendants were given additional charges under Articles 192.2.2 (illegal entrepreneurship resulting in large income), 192.2.3 (...committed by an organized group), 193–1.3.1 (legalization of property obtained through criminal means), 193–1.3.2 (...committed on a large scale), 206.4 (smuggling committed by an organized group), 213.2.1 (tax evasion committed by an organized group), 320.1 (forgery of documents), and 320.2 (use of forged documents) of the Criminal Code of Azerbaijan.

A number of local and international human rights organizations condemned the arrest of Shamshad Agha, calling it politically motivated, and called on the authorities of Azerbaijan to immediately release him.

He is currently being held in the Baku pre-trial detention center of the Penitentiary Service of the Ministry of Justice.

== Early years ==
Shamshad Islam oglu Aghayev was born on September 1, 1982, in the village of Şivlə, Lerik District.

In 1989, he entered secondary school in the village of Bilavar and graduated from it in 1999.

From 2000 to 2002, he served in the military on the line of contact in the Fuzuli and Khojavend districts.

In 2003, he entered the Faculty of Philology at Lankaran State University and graduated with honors in 2007.

From 2007 to 2010, he worked as a teacher of Azerbaijani language and literature at the secondary school in the village of Bilavar, the same school he had graduated from.

Since his student years, he actively participated in socio-political processes and wrote reports and columns for the press about the socio-economic problems of the region.

After the 2003 presidential election, he became a member of the Musavat Party.

== Journalistic sctivity ==
Shamshad Agha has been engaged in journalism since his student years; he is also involved in creative activities. His poems have been published in the newspaper Sənət (“Art”), the magazine Məşəl (“Torch”), and on the website Kult.az.

In 2014, together with friends, he founded the website Arqument.az and serves as its editor-in-chief. In 2018, the website was blocked twice for political reasons due to its activities.

In 2016, together with Akif Gurbanov and Alasgar Mammadli, they founded the media platform Toplum TV to train young journalists, where Shamshad worked as an editor. Later, he became the host of the program Debat on the channel, dedicated to socio-political topics.

At the same time, he participated in training young journalists as a lecturer and coordinator at the School of Democracy operating under the Institute for Democratic Initiatives (IDI). In parallel, he also worked as an editor at the website Faktyoxla.info.

Since 2021, he has been writing articles on political and social issues for the channel Meydan TV. After leaving Toplum TV in 2022, he worked as an editor at Meydan TV while continuing his work at Arqument.az.

In 2024, he was questioned as a witness in a criminal case opened against the founder and journalists of Toplum TV at the Main Police Department of the city of Baku, and he was banned from leaving the country.

He is a member of the Azerbaijan Journalists Union (AJB). During his journalistic activity, Shamshad Agha was subjected to persecution and pressure.

On July 22, 2016, he was summoned for questioning to the Main Directorate for Combating Organized Crime of the Ministry of Internal Affairs.

On August 8, 2018, the Sabail District Court, chaired by Judge Elmar Rahimov, considered a request from the Ministry of Transport, Communications and High Technologies to restrict the activity of the website arqument.az. The website's editor-in-chief, Shamshad Agha, stated that during the hearing it became clear that the ministry's claims were unfounded. “The judge himself saw this, and the inability of the ministry officials to answer questions confirmed this picture,” Agha added, calling the court's decision “political.” The restrictions on the website's activity caused significant dissatisfaction in society and among critics. On August 10, 2018, the Baku Court of Appeal overturned the Sabail District Court's decision of August 8, 2018, to block the website arqument.az.

On April 8, 2019, access to the website arqument.az was restricted again, this time without a court decision. On September 27, the Baku Administrative-Economic Court No. 1, chaired by Judge Elchin Mammadov, considered a lawsuit filed by the website arqument.az against the Ministry of Transport, Communications and High Technologies. On December 24, following four months of court proceedings, Shamshad Agha's lawsuit against the ministry was rejected, and access to the website was effectively blocked nationwide without a court decision.

In February 2023, he stated that the new draft media law, particularly the provisions regarding the creation of a unified register, created broad opportunities to restrict freedom of speech and media activities. He became one of 40 journalists who signed a position paper prepared by independent journalists and media experts in Azerbaijan.

== Arrest and trial (2025–2026) ==
Shamshad Agha was detained on the night of February 5–6, 2025. In his detailed account of the arrest, Agha stated that at around 1 a.m. he was detained by masked individuals near Neftchilar Park (Nizami District). He was handcuffed and forcibly placed in a car. After that, Shamshad Agha was beaten inside the vehicle. They took a phone from his pocket and demanded the password. When Shamshad Agha refused to give the password, one of the police officers struck him on the neck. After that, his condition worsened, and he asked the police to take medicine from his pocket and place it under his tongue, but instead they demanded the password to his phone. Shamshad Agha refused to give the password, and they refused to give him the medicine. Then, when Shamshad Agha requested his lawyer, a police officer hit him in the jaw with his elbow. After about 20–25 minutes, a man entered the car and introduced himself as Lieutenant Colonel of Police Samir Ismayilov, an investigator from the Main Police Department of the City of Baku. He told Agha that he had been detained as a suspect in connection with the “Meydan TV case.”

They then went to the apartment where Shamshad Agha lived. At that time, his brother and daughter were in the house. Together with the police officers, they approached the door of Agha's apartment, covered the door peephole with their hands, and quietly knocked on the door. His brother asked who they were. Shamshad Agha said in Talysh: “Shahid (brother), I have been arrested. Open the door and try not to scare the child.” At that moment, a police officer grabbed his mouth and hit him in the stomach. As soon as the door was opened, dozens of police officers entered the apartment and first seized the internet modem. After that, an оперативный (operational) search was conducted in the apartment. They took the computers belonging to Shamshad Agha and his wife, electronic equipment, phones, a tablet computer, and his brother's phone.

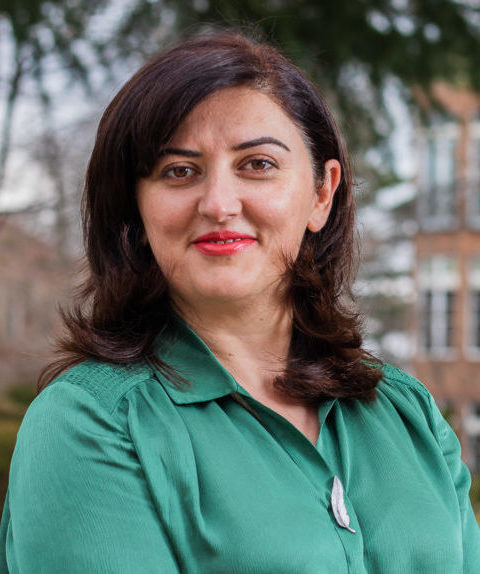
According to lawyer Shahla Humbatova, no initial evidence of Shamshad Agha's involvement in this criminal case was presented to the court. Neither the judge nor the representative of the investigative body was able to answer the court's numerous questions regarding the reasons for Agha's arrest.

Then investigator Samir Ismayilov demanded that Shamshad Agha provide the password to his phone. Shamshad Agha told the investigator that he would not give the password without the presence of his lawyer, Shahla Humbatova. After that, one of the police officers said that they would take his daughter and brother to the Main Police Department of the city of Baku and release them the next day, and continued threatening him. Under pressure and threats, Shamshad Agha gave the password to his phone in order to avoid psychological trauma, although he suspected that the police might take the 16-year-old girl with them.

After the search in the apartment was completed, Shamshad Agha was taken to the Main Police Department of the city of Baku. He was then interrogated in the presence of his lawyer, Shahla Humbatova. Shamshad Agha did not admit guilt and described the arrests of journalists from Abzas Media, Toplum TV, and Meydan TV since November 2023 as repression against media freedom. After the interrogation, Shamshad Agha was taken to the Temporary Detention Facility of the Khatai District Police Department. Shamshad Agha was listed as a suspect in criminal case No. 240200039, initiated on December 6, 2024, against the management and journalists of Meydan TV. He was charged under Article 206.3.2 of the Criminal Code (smuggling committed by a group of persons by prior conspiracy). On February 6, the investigative body's motion regarding the arrest of Shamshad Agha was considered. During his statement, Shamshad Agha categorically denied the accusations and told the investigative body: “I am not your prisoner, but the prisoner of Ilham Aliyev (President of Azerbaijan),” linking his arrest to his journalistic activities. Shamshad Agha was arrested by decision of Judge Rafael Sagidov of the Khatai District Court of Baku. He was sentenced to two months and one day of pre-trial detention. According to lawyer Shahla Humbatova, no initial evidence of Shamshad Agha's involvement in this criminal case was presented to the court. Neither the judge nor the representative of the investigative body was able to answer the court's numerous questions about the reasons for Agha's arrest. Although the execution of the arrest was initially assigned to Detention Facility No. 3 (Shuvalan), he was later transferred to the Baku Pre-Trial Detention Center (Zabrat). On February 13, a panel of judges of the Criminal Chamber of the Baku Court of Appeal—Javid Huseyn (rapporteur), Gabil Mammadov, and Elbey Allahverdiyev—considered the appeal filed by Shamshad Agha and his lawyer Shahla Humbatova. The court rejected the appeal and upheld Agha's detention. Shahla Humbatova described the decision as unfounded.

On March 14, 2025, by the decision of Judge Sulhana Hajiyeva of the Khatai District Court of Baku, Shamshad Agha's pre-trial detention was extended by three months.

On June 24, 2025, by the decision of Judge Rafael Sadigov of the Khatai District Court of Baku, his detention was extended by one month and 30 days.

On August 28, 2025, the charges in the criminal case investigated by the Main Police Department of Baku were intensified. Shamshad Agha and other individuals arrested in this case were charged under eight articles of the Azerbaijani Criminal Code. The new charges included Articles 192.2.2 (illegal entrepreneurship generating large income), 192.2.3 (...committed by an organized group), 193–1.3.1 (legalization of property obtained through criminal means), 193–1.3.2 (...committed on a large scale), 206.4 (smuggling committed by an organized group), 213.2.1 (tax evasion committed by an organized group), 320.1 (forgery of documents), and 320.2 (use of forged documents).

On September 1, 2025, by the decision of Judge Rafael Sadigov of the Khatai District Court of Baku, Shamshad Agha's detention was extended by one month and one day.

On September 16, 2025, by the decision of Judge Aygun Hasanova of the Khatai District Court of Baku, his detention was extended by one month and 29 days.

On September 17, Shamshad Agha was hospitalized due to gastrointestinal problems and received treatment there for some time. During his stay, he wrote an article titled “The Most Valuable Here Is Money, the Cheapest — Human Life…”, in which he described cases of bribery, abuse of power, and indifference occurring within the medical facility.

== International attention ==
On February 6, the organization Reporters Without Borders (RSF) condemned the arrest of Shamshad Agha. “Shamshad Agha and Shahnaz Beylargizi have been arrested. Reporters Without Borders calls for the immediate release of these two journalists, as well as 21 other journalists currently imprisoned in the country,” the organization said in a statement. The Committee to Protect Journalists (CPJ) also condemned the arrests. “The arrest of Shamshad Agha is an attempt by the Azerbaijani authorities to silence and further restrict the activities of the country’s small and struggling independent media community. The government must immediately stop its unprecedented crackdown on the media and release Shamshad Agha and all other unjustly imprisoned journalists,” said Gulnoza Said, CPJ's Europe and Central Asia program coordinator.

On February 10, the Norwegian Helsinki Committee also reacted to the arrest of journalists Shamshad Agha and Shahnaz Beylargizi. “The Norwegian Helsinki Committee calls for the immediate and unconditional release of the unlawfully detained journalists and human rights defenders,” the committee said in a statement.

On February 27, the International Federation of Journalists (IFJ) and the European Federation of Journalists (EFJ) also issued a statement calling for the release of imprisoned journalists, including Shamshad Agha, and condemning the Azerbaijani government's harsh policy toward critical media outlets and journalists.

In December 2025, Amnesty International and the Committee to Protect Journalists (CPJ) demanded the release of detained staff members of the channel Meydan TV, including Shamshad Agha. Arzu Abdullayeva, chair of the National Committee of the Azerbaijan Helsinki Citizens' Assembly and a human rights defender, also called for the immediate release of those arrested.

On February 7, 2026, U.S. Congressman Jim McGovern called for the release of Azerbaijani journalists and civil society activists, including Shamshad Agha.

== Personal life ==
He is married and has a daughter and a son.

Shamshad Agha's mother died on January 28, 2026. On January 29, 2026, by a decision of the Baku Court for Grave Crimes, Shamshad Agha was released for three days to attend his mother's funeral.

== See also ==
- Media freedom in Azerbaijan
