= Rovshana Rahimli =

Azerbaijani human rights lawyer

- Rövşanə Rəhimli
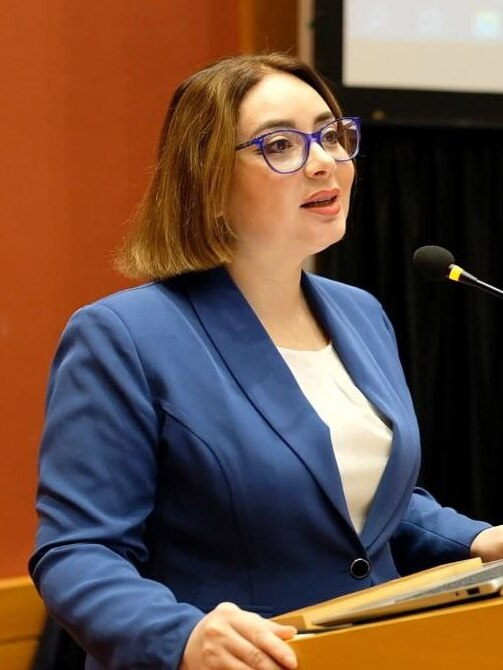
- Rovshana Rahimli in 2023
- Born: July 8, 1984 (age 41); Şirvan, Azerbaijan
- Citizenship: Azerbaijan
- Education: Odlar Yurdu University
- Occupations: lawyer, human rights defender
- Years active: 2014–

Rovshana Rahimli (full name: Rovshana Vagif gizi Rahimova; (Azerbaijani: Rövşanə Vaqif qızı Rəhimova); born on July 8, 1984, Şirvan, Azerbaijan) is an Azerbaijani human rights lawyer. For over 10 years, she has been dedicated to human rights advocacy, with a particular focus on women's rights and combating domestic violence. As a member of the Bar Association of the Republic of Azerbaijan, she has defended the rights of nearly a dozen political prisoners in the country.

== Early years ==
Rovshana Vagif gizi Rahimli was born on July 8, 1984, in the city of Şirvan. She received her legal education at the Odlar Yurdu University.

== Advocacy career ==
Rovshana Rahimli has been defending the rights of individuals arrested for political reasons in Azerbaijan for many years. She also focuses on women's rights and combating domestic violence.

In April 2021, she became a member of the Bar Association. She has defended the rights of lawyer Elchin Sagidov, arrested in September 2022, politician Bakhtiyar Hajiyev, arrested in December of the same year, PhD student of Istanbul University Fazil Gasimov, arrested in August 2023, journalist Nargiz Absalamova from Abzas Media, arrested in November of the same year, human rights defender Ilhamiz Guliyev, arrested in December of the same year, activist Ilkin Amrahov, arrested in March 2024, researcher Igbal Abilov, arrested in July of the same year, human rights defender Rufat Safarov, journalist Aysel Umudova from Meydan TV, and politician Azer Gasimli, all of whom were arrested in December of the same year.

In October 2024, she became one of the heroines of the international exhibition "Portraits of Strength 2024".
