= Press in the Azerbaijan Democratic Republic =

Press in the Azerbaijan Democratic Republic (ADR, Azerbaijani: Azərbaycan Xalq Cümhuriyyətində mətbuat) is one of the stages in the history of the Azerbaijani press (1918–20). During these two years, there were about 100 newspapers and magazines published in ADR.

== Ideology ==
From the point of view of ideological propaganda, the press of 1918-20 can be grouped as follows: the national press (of the Azerbaijan Democratic Republic), the Bolshevik press (opposition), the Socialist-Revolutionary-Menshevik press, etc.

The text of the national publications published in Baku, Ganja, Shusha, Tiflis and other cities was written and published not only in Azerbaijani-Turkish, but also in Russian, Georgian, Polish, Persian, German and other languages.

== Foundation ==
Representatives of Azerbaijani intelligentsia: Hasan bey Zardabi, Alimardan bey Topchubashev, Ismail bey Gasparly and others had a strong influence on the emergence and subsequent development of the national press.

The "Charter on the Press", adopted in accordance with Decree of the Parliament of the ADR dated October 30, 1919, stated that it is sufficient to submit an application to the Inspector General for Press Affairs in order to get permission for the publication. The decree of November 9, 1918 abolished state control over the content, publication and distribution of the press and mass media.

In March 1919, the Council of Ministers decided to establish the Azerbaijan Telegraph Agency.

== National press ==
The national press of Azerbaijan in 1918-20 reflected the interests of various segments of the population. Such newspapers and magazines as "Ganjlar Yurdu", "Afkari-mutaallimin", "Madaniyyat", etc. were published. There were mainly articles published on the development of science, education and culture, as well as socio-economic and political events taking place in the country.

Starting from March 11, 1919, the magazine titled "Ovragi-nafisi" had been the first magazine in the history of the Azerbaijani press that was devoted to literature and art. From March to August 1919, there were only 6 issues published in Baku. The editor of this magazine was Alabbas Muzhib, the publisher was composer Zulfugar Bey Hajibeyli, and the artist was Azim Azimzadeh. The magazine used to consist of photos and articles about music, theater, architectural monuments, the life of actors and stage activities.

Among the press organs during the ADR period, one can distinguish: "Istiglal" (1918–20), "Azerbaijan" (1918-20), "Ovragi-nafisi" (1919), "Salvation" (1920), "Ganjlar Yurdu" (1918), "Sheypur" (1918-1919), "Zanbur (magazine)" (1919), "News of the Azerbaijani Government", etc.

Works of Azerbaijani prominent writers and poets such as Abdullah Shaig, Huseyn Javid, Salman Mumtaz, Feyzullah Sajid, Ali Yusif and others were published in the magazine "Salvation", the first issue of which was published in early 1920.

== The Bolshevik Press ==
In 1917–1920, the Bolsheviks published more than 40 newspapers and magazines in Azerbaijan. The leading organ of the Bolshevik press was the newspaper "Gummet" (1917-1918, edited by publicists Mammad Said Ordubadi and Dadash Bunyadzadeh). The most active representative of the Bolshevik press was Alikhan Garayev. In 1918–1920, Garayev was the editor of such newspapers and magazines as "Red Flag", "Zahmat sadasi", "Bednota", "Rabochaya Pravda", "Voice of Labor", "Torch", "October Revolution", published in Russian and Azerbaijani languages.

In 1918–1920, such Bolshevik press organs as "Bakinets" (1907–20), "Bakinskaya jizn", "Bakinsky rabochiy" (1906-1920, the organ of the Baku Committee of the RSDLP), "Bakinskoye slovo", "Bakinskoye utro", "Iskra", "Nabat" (1919), "Nasha jizn" (1919), "Proletariy" and others operating in Baku.

== Satirical magazines ==
During these years, the satirical magazines "Sheypur" and "Zanbur" were published in Azerbaijan. The publisher of Sheypur, the first issue of which was published on October 5, 1918, was Samad Mansur, and the editor was Mammadali Sidgi. Published in April 1919, “Zanbur” published poems and journalistic articles by Mammadali Sidgi, Ali Nazmi, Samad Mansur, Balagardash Sattaroglu and other authors. The color cartoons in the magazine belonged to Azim Azimzadeh. Being published once a week, "Zanbur" got 24 issues.

== See also ==
Azerbaijan Democratic Republic

Mass media in Azerbaijan
