= Keskon =

- Village
- Location within Azerbaijan
- Coordinates: 38°49′59″N 48°21′07″E
- Country: Azerbaijan
- Rayon: Lerik
- Time zone: UTC+4 (AZT)
  - Summer (DST): UTC+5 (AZT)

Keskon is a village in the municipality of Şivlə in the Lerik District of Azerbaijan.
