= Marianne Díaz Hernández =

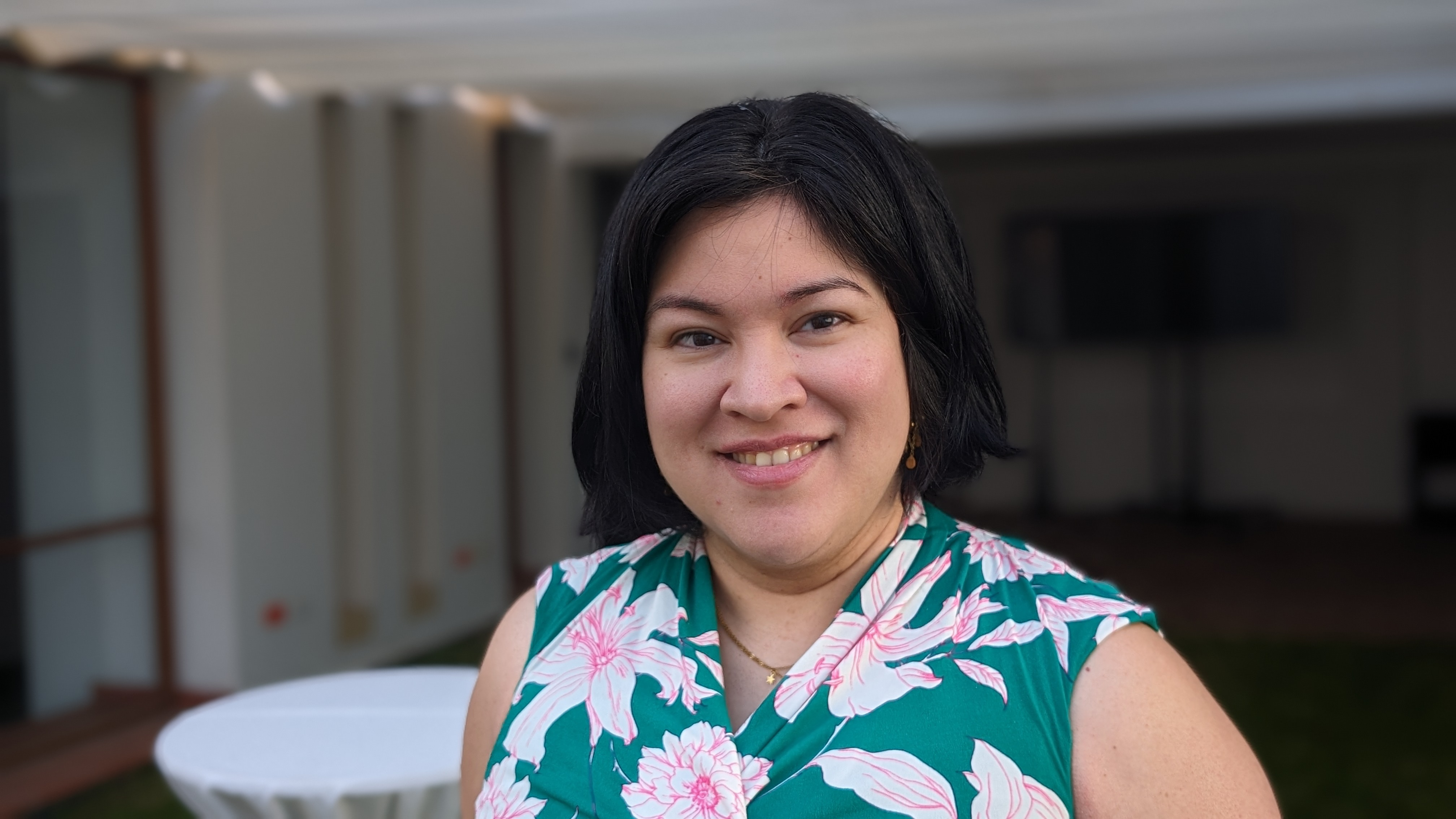
- Born: June 4, 1985 (age 41); Altagracia de Orituco, Venezuela
- Education: Universidad de Carabobo
- Occupations: Lawyer, writer, human rights activist, researcher
- Years active: 2007-present
- Awards: Human Rights Hero, 2019 ; Global Leader of Digital Human Rights, 2022
- Website: the-far-away.com

Marianne Díaz Hernández (born in Altagracia de Orituco, on June 4, 1985), is a Venezuelan fiction writer, lawyer and human rights activist.

== Biography ==
Marianne Díaz Hernández graduated as a lawyer from Universidad de Carabobo and was a postgraduate degree teacher at Universidad Católica Andrés Bello. She is a researcher and an activist on the intersection of technology and human rights, and was an active member of Creative Commons Venezuela and Global Voices, being part of the latter's board as a representative of their volunteer base between 2018 and 2019.

Between the years of 2016 and 2021 Díaz Hernández worked as a public policy officer at the Latin American NGO based in Chile, Derechos Digitales. After, she was a fellow of the #KeepItOn campaign at Access Now, where she led the #WhyID campaign. As a leader of the #WhyID campaign, she developed the Digital Identity Toolkit, a tool that "aims to help digital rights activists working on digital identification systems to navigate the complexities of the topic in an easier way, as well as to provide them with language that might help get them started in campaigning, advocating, educating, and mobilizing around digital ID systems". She also co-founded the Venezuelan NGO Acceso Libre, which documented and reported on the state of the internet in Venezuela.

As a fiction writer, she published her first book of short stories in 2007, after winning the Contest for Unpublished Authors held by Monte Ávila Editores. After that, she published the short story book “Aviones de papel”. In 2011, she won the I National Biennial of Literature Gustavo Pereira with her book “Historias de mujeres perversas”, which was published in 2013 by El perro y la rana. In 2024, she published her fourth short story collection, "El país de las pesadillas".

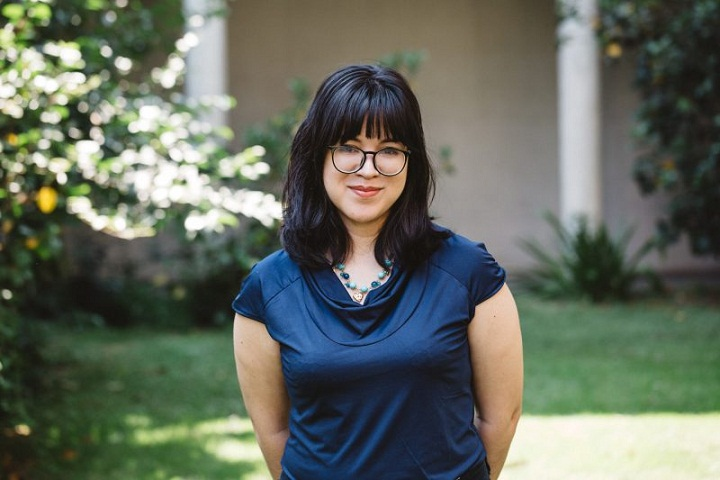
Marianne Díaz in 2020

== Awards ==
- “Global Leader of Digital Human Rights” (2022)
- “Human Rights Heroes” (2019)
- Winner of the Contest for Unpublished Authors held by Monte Ávila Editores, for the book Cuentos en el espejo (Monte Ávila Editores, 2007)
- Winner of the I National Biennial of Literature Gustavo Pereira, for Historias de mujeres perversas (I Bienal Gustavo Pereira, 2013)

== Other publications ==
- Cuentos en el espejo, 2008, Monte Ávila Editores.
- Aviones de Papel, 2011, Monte Ávila Editores.
- Historias de mujeres perversas, 2013, El perro y la rana.
- El país de las pesadillas, 2024.
- Documenting Internet blocking in Venezuela, 2014, Digital Rights LAC.
- Telecommunications and Internet Access Sector: Latin America. Report to the Special Rapporteur on the Protection and Promotion of the Right to Freedom of Expression of the United Nations, 2016, NGO Derechos Digitales.
- Retención de datos y registro de teléfonos móviles: Chile en el contexto Latinoamericano, 2017, NGO Derechos Digitales.
- Data Retention and Registration of Mobile Phones: Chile in the Latin American Context, 2017, NGO Derechos Digitales.
- Políticas públicas para el acceso a internet en Venezuela: Inversión, infraestructura y el derecho al acceso entre los años 2000-2017, 2018, NGO Derechos Digitales.
- El cuerpo como dato, 2018, NGO Derechos Digitales.
- Discurso de odio en América Latina: Tendencias de regulación, rol de los intermediarios y riesgos para la libertad de expresión, 2020, NGO Derechos Digitales.
- Identity systems and social protection in Venezuela and Bolivia: Gender impacts and other inequalities, in co-authorship with Jamila Venturini, 2021, NGO Derechos Digitales.
- Sistemas de identificación y protección social en Venezuela y Bolivia: impactos de género y otras formas de discriminación, in co-authorship with Jamila Venturini, 2021, NGO Derechos Digitales.
- Memes para sobrevivir el apocalipsis, 2021, NGO Derechos Digitales.
- The return of digital authoritarianism: internet shutdowns in 2021, in co-authorship with Felicia Anthonio. 2022, Access Now.
