= Elnara Gasimova =

Azerbaijani journalist

- Elnarə Qasımova
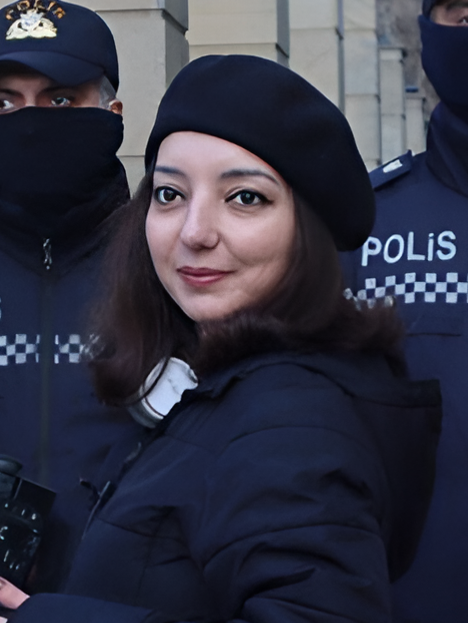
- Elnara Gasimova in 2023
- Born: February 5, 1996 (age 30); Baku, Azerbaijan
- Citizenship: Azerbaijan
- Education: Baku State College of Communications and Transport
- Occupations: journalist, political prisoner
- Years active: 2018–present

Elnara Bahadar gizi Gasimova (Azerbaijani: Elnarə Bahadar qızı Qasımova; born February 5, 1996, Baku) is an Azerbaijani journalist and political prisoner. She was a reporter for Abzas Media.

In January 2024, she was arrested in a case against the management and journalists of Abzas Media, initiated by the Investigative Department of the Main Police Department of the city of Baku. On 16 August 2024, the charges in the criminal case investigated by the Main Police Department of Baku were aggravated. Elnara Gasimova and other individuals arrested in this case were charged under seven articles of the Criminal Code of Azerbaijan. New charges were brought under Articles 192.3.2, 193-1.3.1, 193-1.3.2, 206.4, 320.1, and 320.2 of the Criminal Code of Azerbaijan. These include the following acts: illegal entrepreneurship involving large-scale income; laundering of criminally obtained funds committed by an organized group; smuggling committed by an organized group; forgery of documents and use of forged documents under the Criminal Code of Azerbaijan.

On 20 June 2025, the Baku Court on Grave Crimes sentenced her to eight years of imprisonment. From January 2024 to September 2025, she served her sentence in the Baku Pre-Trial Detention Center (Zabrat settlement), and from September 2025 in the Lankaran Penitentiary Complex (city of Lankaran).

== Early life ==
Elnara Gasimova was born on 5 February 1996 in Baku.

In 2014, she graduated from the Baku State College of Communications and Transport. In 2016, she graduated from the Baku School of Journalism (BSJ).

From 2014 to 2016, she was a member of the Nida Civic Movement.

== Journalistic activity ==
Elnara Gasimova has been engaged in journalism since 2018. During this time, she collaborated with Open Azerbaijan, Meydan TV, Voice of America, BBC Azerbaijan, and Mikroskop Media. Since October 2023, she has worked with Abzas Media. In the course of her professional activity, she has been repeatedly subjected to detentions, police obstruction, and ill-treatment.

On 4 August 2021, while performing her professional duties in front of the administrative building of the Khazar District Police Department, Elnara Gasimova was detained together with her colleagues Ulviyya Ali and Nargiz Absalamova during a feminist protest against the murder of Sevil Maharramova. During the detention, she was subjected to rough treatment; she was insulted inside the building, and her filming equipment was damaged. Despite complaints filed with the relevant authorities, no results followed.

== Arrest and trial (2024–2025) ==
On 27 November 2023, Elnara Gasimova was questioned as a witness in criminal case No. 230200080 conducted by the Investigative Department of the Main Police Department of the city of Baku, the division for the investigation of serious crimes. Gasimova stated that she was interrogated for two hours about her arrested colleagues.

Fifteen days later, Elnara Gasimova was again summoned for questioning as a witness. She stated that she was among those questioned in November 2023. Journalist Nargiz Absalamova, who was questioned at the same time as a witness, was later arrested on smuggling charges, as were her colleagues. Law enforcement officers explained to Gasimova that she was being summoned to clarify “issues that had arisen in the case of the online publication Abzas Media.” However, Gasimova stated that she most likely would be arrested. After the interrogation at the Main Police Department of Baku, Elnara Gasimova was detained as a suspect under Article 206.3.2 (smuggling committed by a group of persons by prior conspiracy) of the Criminal Code of Azerbaijan, according to her lawyer Bahruz Bayramov.

On 15 January 2024, Judge Bakhtiyar Mammadov of the Khatai District Court of Baku ordered that Elnara Gasimova be placed in pre-trial detention for two months, until 13 March 2024. Lawyer Bahruz Bayramov emphasized the inhumane treatment of the journalist by convoy officers, stating that she was brought to court handcuffed behind her back, possibly to prevent her from greeting colleagues gathered outside the courthouse. Such treatment, he noted, contradicts international legal standards. He added that when she was brought into the courtroom, the handcuffs were already placed in front. Another lawyer, Aisha Abdel Gadir, pointed out the lack of grounds for Gasimova’s detention. According to her, the investigative motion did not present any evidence justifying the necessity of detention. When the judge asked the investigator why her arrest was necessary, the investigator replied that “there are other persons in this case, and she may influence them,” without explaining the basis for this claim. The defense stated that there was no need to keep Gasimova in custody, as she had permanent residence in Baku, appeared for investigative actions when summoned, and had not attempted to flee.

On 19 January 2024, the Baku Court of Appeal considered the appeal against Gasimova’s arrest and rejected it. On 25 January, the Khatai District Court refused to transfer her to house arrest.

On 7 March 2024, the Khatai District Court extended her detention by three months. Appeals filed by the defense were rejected. Subsequent motions to change the preventive measure to house arrest were also denied. On 10 June 2024, the court extended her detention by another two months. On 10 August 2024, the detention was extended by one month and seven days. Appeals against these decisions were rejected.

On 19 August 2024, the charges were aggravated, and new accusations were brought under additional articles of the Criminal Code.

On 17 December 2024, the trial of the management and journalists of Abzas Media, as well as Hafiz Babali and Radio Free Europe/Radio Liberty contributor Farid Mehralizade, began. During the trial, Gasimova denied all charges and linked her arrest to her journalistic work. Motions for house arrest were rejected.

=== Sentencing and time in prison ===
On 20 May 2025, Prosecutor Rauf Malishov requested a sentence of 11 years of imprisonment. On 20 June 2025, the Baku Court on Grave Crimes sentenced Gasimova to eight years in prison. In July 2025, Gasimova undertook a hunger strike in solidarity with fellow prisoner Ulvi Hasanli. At the time, she also reported poor living conditions, including unclean cells, lack of ventilation, lighting, and shower facilities, and lack of access to a telephone to speak to family.

In August 2025, the Baku Court of Appeal began reviewing appeals. By a decision dated 9 September 2025, the eight-year sentence was upheld.

== International attention ==
Following Gasimova’s arrest, the head of the European Union Delegation to Azerbaijan, Ambassador Peter Michalko, and the OSCE Representative on Freedom of the Media, Teresa Ribeiro, strongly condemned the arrests of journalists in the country.

The International Federation of Journalists (IFJ) and the European Federation of Journalists (EFJ) issued a joint statement describing a disturbing wave of arrests and repression against independent journalists and media in Azerbaijan. U.S. Senator and Chairman of the Senate Foreign Relations Committee Ben Cardin called on Baku to release political prisoners.

== See also ==
- Nargiz Absalamova
- Media freedom in Azerbaijan
