= Nargiz Absalamova =

Azerbaijani journalist

- Nərgiz Absalamova
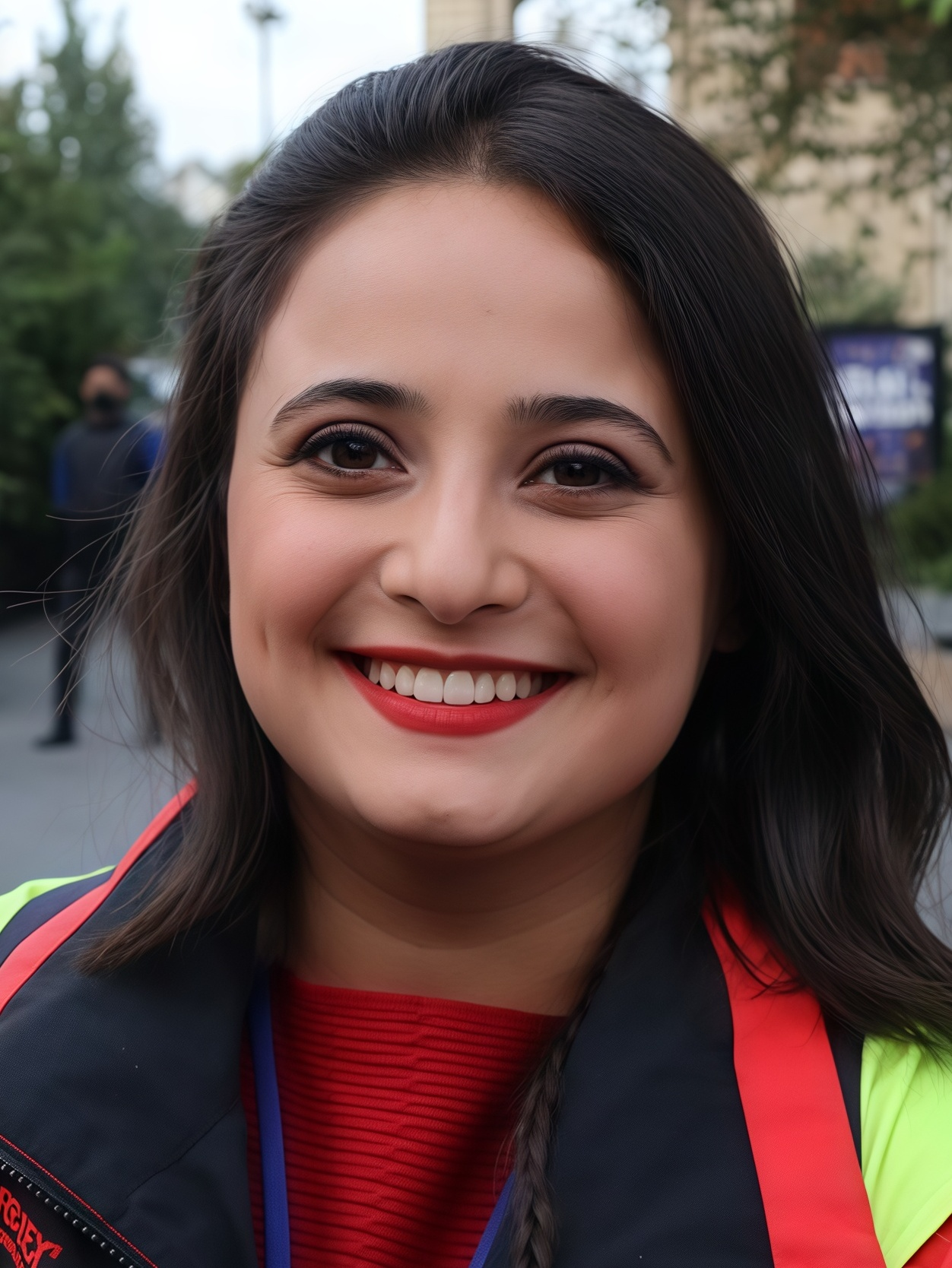
- Nargiz Absalamova in 2022
- Born: July 17, 1998 (age 28); Baku, Azerbaijan
- Citizenship: Azerbaijan
- Education: Baku State University
- Occupations: journalist, political prisoner
- Years active: 2019–present
- Awards: Free Media Awards (2025)

Nargiz Absalamova (full name: Nargiz Fazail gizi Absalamova, Azerbaijani: Nərgiz Fəzail qızı Absalamova; born July 17, 1998, Baku, Azerbaijan) — Azerbaijani journalist and political prisoner; a reporter for Abzas Media. She is the recipient of the Gerd Bucerius Free Media Awards for 2025.

On November 30, 2023, she was charged in a criminal case against the leadership and journalists of AbzasMedia, initiated by the Investigative Department of the Main Police Department of the city of Baku, and was arrested by a decision of the Khatai District Court on December 1, 2023. On August 16, 2024, the charges in the criminal case investigated by the Main Police Department of Baku were intensified. Nargiz Absalamova and other individuals arrested in this case were charged under seven articles of the Criminal Code. New charges were brought under Articles 192.3.2, 193-1.3.1, 193-1.3.2, 206.4, 320.1, and 320.2 of the Criminal Code of Azerbaijan. These include: illegal entrepreneurship with large profits; money laundering committed by an organized group; smuggling committed by an organized group; forgery of documents and use of forged documents under the Criminal Code of Azerbaijan.

A number of local and international human rights organizations condemned the arrest of Nargiz Absalamova, calling it politically motivated, and urged the Azerbaijani authorities to release her immediately.

On June 20, 2025, the Baku Serious Crimes Court sentenced her to 8 years of imprisonment.

From November 2023 to September 2025, she served her sentence in the Baku Pre-Trial Detention Center (Zabrat settlement), and from September 2025 — in the Lankaran Penitentiary Complex (Lankaran city).

== Early life ==
Nargiz Absalamova was born on July 17, 1998, in Baku.

From 2004 to 2015, she studied at Secondary School No. 170 in the Sabunçu settlement.

From 2015 to 2019, she received higher education at the Faculty of Journalism of Baku State University.

In 2019, she completed the Young Journalists Training Program of the Institute of Democratic Initiatives (IDI).

== Journalistic activity ==
Nargiz Absalamova has been engaged in journalism since 2019. During this time, she collaborated with media outlets such as Toplum TV and Mikroskop Media. Since 2021, she has been working with Abzas Media.

As part of her professional work, she also produced content for the Fem-Utopia platform, aimed at promoting feminist ideas and creating educational content in the Azerbaijani language on feminism.

In the course of her professional activities, she was repeatedly subjected to detentions, police interference, and ill-treatment.

June 2, 2020 — She was detained by police while covering a solo picket by feminist activist Gulnara Mehdiyeva in front of the Ministry of Education. She was released after three hours at Police Station No. 18 of the Narimanov District Police Department. Absalamova stated that she was detained while filming Mehdiyeva's arrest. According to her, law enforcement officers acted roughly, broke the handle of her tripod, and damaged her fingernail.

October 13, 2020 — During an interview with Giyas Ibrahimov, who had been summoned to the Prosecutor General’s Office, Nargiz Absalamova and her colleague Ulviyya Ali were detained together with Ibrahimov. After more than an hour at Police Station No. 26 of the Yasamal District Police Department, they were released.

August 4, 2021 — While performing her professional duties outside the administrative building of the Khazar District Police Department, Absalamova was detained together with colleagues Ulviyya Ali and Elnara Gasimova during a feminist protest against the murder of Sevil Maharramova. She was subjected to rough treatment, verbally insulted inside the building, and her filming equipment was damaged. Complaints filed with relevant authorities produced no results.

December 28, 2021 — During a protest by independent journalists and media workers outside the Azerbaijani parliament, she was subjected to police violence. According to her, she fell during a clash with law enforcement and sustained injuries. Doctors diagnosed her with a fractured coccyx. Although the Ministry of Internal Affairs claimed that force had not been used, video footage later surfaced showing law enforcement officers knocking several women to the ground. Absalamova fell onto a stone curb. She later sought medical help, where doctors confirmed a coccyx fracture and soft tissue injuries. She was prescribed three weeks of bed rest and instructed to sit only in a special chair.

June 21, 2023 — She faced police interference while covering a protest by local residents in the village of Soyudlu, Gadabay District. She was detained along with colleagues Nigar Mubariz and Elsever Muradzade; their phones were confiscated, and they were forcibly removed from the village and later expelled from the district. The Committee to Protect Journalists (CPJ) called on Baku to investigate the incidents in Soyudlu.

Nargiz Absalamova also participated in feminist rallies held on March 8 in 2020–2023, demanding that the Azerbaijani government accede to the Istanbul Convention, aimed at ensuring gender equality in labor and education and combating violence against women. In 2021, she was detained during one of these protests.

== Arrest and trial (2023–2025) ==
On November 23, 2023, Nargiz Absalamova was questioned as a witness in criminal case No. 230200080 by the Investigative Department of the Main Police Department of Baku. She stated that the questioning focused on the activities of Abzas Media and that it became clear to her that the outlet itself was the target.

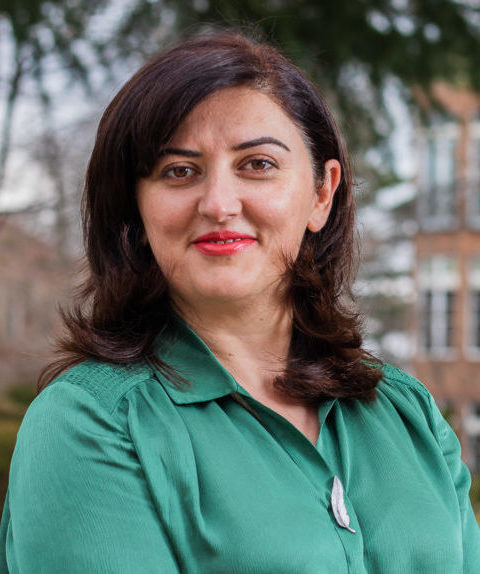
According to Shahla Humbatova's lawyer, the investigation did not provide any grounds for criminal prosecution and arrest of Nargiz Absalamova.

On November 30, 2023, she was summoned again for questioning and detained, charged with currency smuggling. The Ministry of Internal Affairs confirmed her detention. On December 1, the Khatai District Court ordered her pre-trial detention for three months under Article 206.3.2 of the Criminal Code (smuggling committed by a group).

Her lawyer Shahla Humbatova stated that Absalamova rejected the charges and said the real reason for her prosecution was her journalistic work. The defense argued that there was no evidence linking her to the alleged money discovered in the AbzasMedia office.

The Baku Court of Appeal upheld her detention on December 9, 2023. During the first three months of her arrest, Absalamova was denied contact with her family and lawyers; restrictions were lifted only on February 20, 2024.

Subsequent motions to place her under house arrest were repeatedly denied. Her detention was extended multiple times throughout 2024.

On August 16, 2024, the charges were officially aggravated, with multiple serious economic and criminal accusations added.

On December 17, 2024, the trial of Abzas Media leadership and journalists began.. Absalamova denied all charges and stated that her arrest was linked to her journalistic activities. All defense motions for house arrest were rejected..

On May 20, 2025, the prosecutor requested an 11-year prison sentence. On June 20, 2025, the court sentenced her to 8 years in prison.

In September 2025, the Baku Court of Appeal upheld the sentence.

From November 2023 to September 2025, she served her sentence in the Baku Pre-Trial Detention Center (Zabrat settlement), and from September 2025 — in the Lankaran Penitentiary Complex (Lankaran city).

== International response and awards ==
The Committee to Protect Journalists (CPJ) condemned the arrest of Nargiz Absalamova and called on Azerbaijani authorities to release her and her colleagues.

== Awards ==
- Free Media Awards (2025) — Gerd Bucerius Award for Free Media of Eastern Europe.

== See also ==
- Elnara Gasimova
- Media freedom in Azerbaijan
