= Mehman Huseynov =

Azerbaijani journalist and human rights activist

- Azerbaijani: Mehman Hüseynov
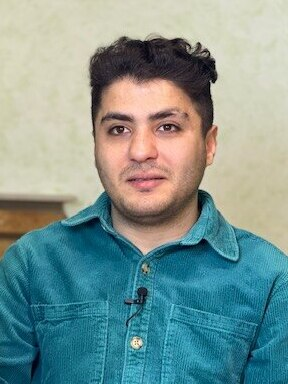
- Born: November 24, 1989 (age 36); Baku, Azerbaijan,
- Education: Azerbaijan State University of Economics
- Occupations: journalist, human rights activist
- Relatives: Emin Huseynov (brother)
- Website: https://www.facebook.com/Sancaq.biz

Mehman Rafig oglu Huseynov (Azerbaijani: Mehman Rafiq oğlu Hüseynov; born 24 November 1989) is an Azerbaijani journalist and human rights activist. He was imprisoned from 2017 to 2019.

== Career and Arrests ==
Huseynov edits SANCAQ, a socio-political magazine, which uses social media. He also chaired the Institute for Reporters' Freedom and Safety (IRFS), an Azerbaijani human rights organisation concerned with freedom of expression and freedom of information, which was shut down after a police raid in the summer of 2014. Prior to his arrest he had launched a campaign, “Hunt for Corrupt Officials”. The purpose was to provide evidence of corruption amongst Azerbaijan's ruling establishment.

He was arrested in central Baku at around 8 pm local time on Monday 9 January 2017. He had recently posted online pictures of luxury properties he claimed were owned by government officials. He has also claimed he was subsequently tortured. The day following his arrest, he was tried in a closed session of the Nəsimi raion court and fined 200 manat (about 105 euro) for "disobedience to a lawful order by police officers". He subsequently received a visit from international doctors who stated his medical and psychological condition was consistent with his claims of mistreatment. However, on 3 March 2017, he appeared at the Suraxanı raion where he was found guilty of "slander" and sentenced to two years imprisonment. On 2 March 2019, Mehman Huseynov was released.

In January 2019 his lawyer, Shahla Humbatova, spoke publicly about the poor conditions of his detention. She was later cautioned for "spreading false information" by the penitentiary service. The prison subsequently refused to allow her access to Huseynov (and other clients). The bar association attracted international criticism for moving to disbar Humbatova from a number of bodies, including the International Bar Association’s Human Rights Institute and Lawyers for Lawyers.

== Awards ==
Mehman Huseynov was awarded the Free Media Award from Fritt Ord Foundation and the Zeit Foundation in 2013.
