= Lankaran State University =

University in Azerbaijan

Coordinates: 38.7544°N 48.8512°E

- Lənkəran Dövlət Universiteti; Lánkoni Kišvari Universitet
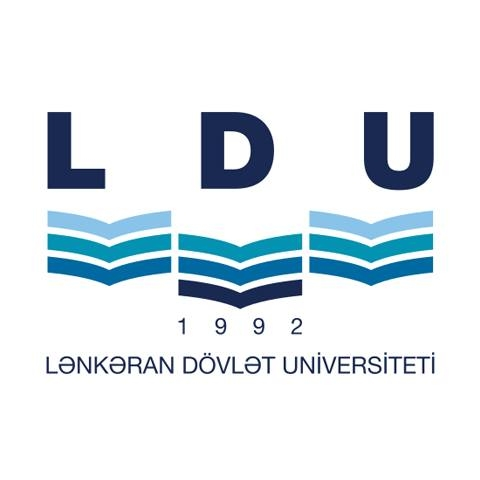
- Type: Public
- Established: July 23, 1992
- Rector: Prof. Natiq Ibrahimov
- Faculty: 250
- Undergraduates: 1500
- Postgraduates: 100
- Location: 50 General H. Aslanov Street, 4200, Lankaran, Azerbaijan
- Campus: Urban
- Website: www.lsu.edu.az

Lankaran State University (Azerbaijani: Lənkəran Dövlət Universiteti, Talysh: Lánkoni Kišvari Universitet) is a public university located in Lankaran, Azerbaijan. In 1991 it began to operate as a branch of Baku State University, and in 1992 it received a status of an independent state university.

The university has about 1500 undergraduate and 100 graduates students. Out of the 250 professors working at the university, 150 are Candidates of Science

== Departments and Institutes ==
- Lankaran State University
  - Faculty of Philology and Primary Education
    - Department of Azerbaijani Language and Literature
    - Department of Foreign Languages and Translation
    - Department of Primary and Preschool Education
  - Faculty of Natural Sciences
    - Department of Mathematics and Computer Science
    - Department of Chemistry and Physics
    - Department of Biology and Ecology
  - Faculty of History, Geography, and Art
    - Department of History and Teaching Methods
    - Department of Geography and Teaching Methods
    - Department of Pedagogy, Psychology, and the Arts
  - Faculty of Economics and Management
    - Economics and Innovative Management
    - Financial Management and Audit
  - Faculty of Agrarian and Engineering Sciences
    - Department of Technology and Technical Sciences
    - Department of Veterinary and Agricultural Sciences
  - Faculty of Veterinary Medicine
    - Department of Veterinary and Animal Husbandry Sciences
