= Şivlə =

- Municipality
- Location within Azerbaijan
- Coordinates: 38°48′22″N 48°36′53″E
- Country: Azerbaijan
- Rayon: Lerik

Population
  - Total: 621
- Time zone: UTC+4 (AZT)
  - Summer (DST): UTC+5 (AZT)

Şivlə (also, Shivlik) is a village and municipality in the Lerik Rayon of Azerbaijan. It has a population of 621. The municipality consists of the villages of Şivlə and Keskon.
