= Global Voices =

Non-profit organization of grassroots citizen writers, bloggers, and digital activists

- Founded: 2004, Berkman Center for Internet & Society
- Type: Nonprofit foundation
- Purpose: Journalism
- Headquarters: Amsterdam, Netherlands
- Coordinates: 52.3855°N 4.8433°E
- Region served: Global
- Website: globalvoices.org

Global Voices is an international community-based organisation, consisting of writers, bloggers, translators, journalists, researchers, digital activists and experts that aim to translate and report on what is being said in citizen media worldwide. It started as a nonprofit project at the Berkman Center for Internet and Society at Harvard Law School that grew out of an international bloggers' meeting held in December 2004. The organization was founded by Ethan Zuckerman and Rebecca MacKinnon. In 2008, it became an independent non-profit organisation incorporated in Amsterdam, Netherlands.

== Summits ==
Global Voices has organized biannual summits and bloggers meetings for their virtual community to meet face-to-face.

Global Voices Summits
Summit	Place	Date
Summit 2005	London, United Kingdom	December 10, 2005
Summit 2006	Delhi, India	December 16, 2006
Summit 2008	Budapest, Hungary	June 27-28, 2008
Summit 2010	Santiago, Chile	May 6-7, 2010
Summit 2012	Nairobi, Kenya	July 2-3, 2012
Summit 2015	Cebu, Philippines	January 24-25, 2015
Summit 2017	Colombo, Sri Lanka	December 2-3, 2017
Summit 2019	Taipei, Taiwan	June 2, 2019
Summit 2024	Kathmandu, Nepal	December 6-7, 2024

Global Voices Bloggers Meetings
Meeting	Place	Date
Arab Bloggers Meeting 2008	Beirut, Lebanon	2008
Arab Bloggers Meeting 2009	Beirut, Lebanon	December 7-12, 2009
Arab Bloggers Meeting 2011	Tunisia	2011
Arab Bloggers Meeting 2014	Amman, Jordan	January 20-23, 2014

== Notable people ==
- Marianne Díaz Hernández
- Arzu Geybullayeva
- Omid Memarian
- Nanjala Nyabola
- Malka Older
- Raymond Palatino
