= Emin Huseynov =

Azerbaijani journalist and human rights activist

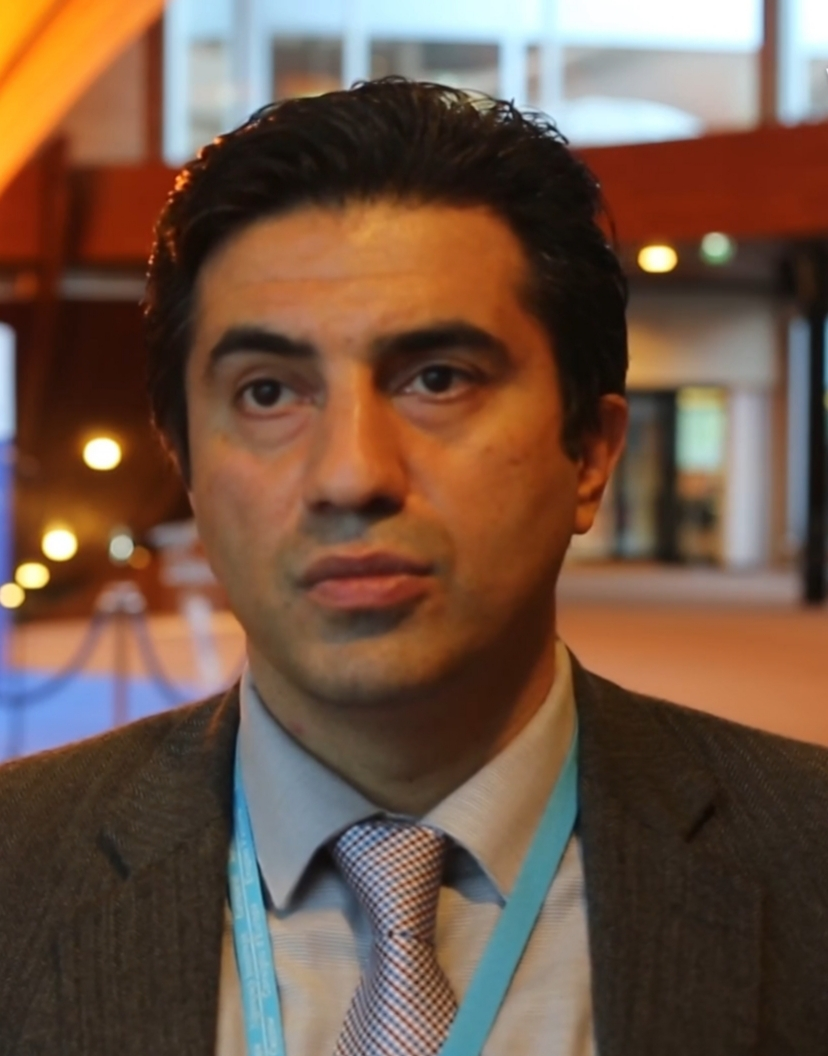
- Huseynov in 2021
- Born: 4 December 1979 (age 46); Baku, Azerbaijan SSR, USSR
- Occupation: Journalist
- Organization(s): Institute for Reporters’ Freedom and Safety
- Known for: Journalism and activism
- Relatives: Mehman Huseynov (brother)

Emin Rafiq oglu Huseynov (Azerbaijani: Emin Hüseynov; born 4 December 1979) is an Azerbaijani journalist and human rights activist. He was the chairman of the Institute for Reporters' Freedom and Safety (IRFS). After he was forced into hiding to avoid arrest, Huseynov fled Azerbaijan and is in the process of attaining political asylum status in Switzerland.

== Life and career ==
Emin Huseynov was born on 4 December 1979 in Baku, Azerbaijan. He completed his education at Azerbaijan State University of Economics. From 2002 to 2005, he worked at the Turan Information Agency, a Baku-based news agency. In 2006, he became the founding member and chairman of the IRFS, and worked as chairman until he went into hiding in 2014. In 2008, he became the monitor of the ITV television channel. In 2010, he became the founding member and chairman of Objective TV. He is married to Sarah Paulsworth, an American citizen.

== Repression and exile ==
In 2008, Huseynov reported about the crackdown of peaceful rallies by Azerbaijani police. He was subsequently detained by the law authorities of Azerbaijan and beaten. Huseynov sustained injuries to the brain and was hospitalized. Due to this event, Huseynov continues to have health concerns.

Afraid of being arrested during a crackdown of journalists in August 2014, Huseynov escaped Azerbaijan to Turkey but was detained at the border. Meanwhile, a raid was conducted at the main office of the IRFS in Baku. Fearing for his life, Huseynov went to the Swiss embassy where he remained hiding. While hiding, the IRFS offices were shut down by the authorities and its members were detained, some beaten. While hiding, Huseynov was convicted of abuse of power and tax evasion, a charge which would sentence him to 12 years in prison if convicted. After almost a year of hiding, Huseynov flew to Switzerland on 13 June 2015. The flight was arranged by the Swiss foreign minister, Didier Burkhalter. He currently resides in Bern and is applying for political asylum.

== International condemnation ==
Several international organization expressed their condemnation and concern over Emin Huseynov's case including International Media Support, Council of Europe, International Freedom of Expression Exchange (IFEX), Article 19, Civil Rights Defenders, Human Rights House Foundation, Commission on Security and Cooperation in Europe, Committee to Protect Journalists, and others. An OSCE representative, Dunja Mijatović, stated:

"The attempts to raid the IRFS office, intimidation of Emin Huseynov’s family and the imposed travel ban are further proof of a wide-scale deterioration of the media freedom situation in Azerbaijan that includes targeted persecution of independent journalists, freedom of expression advocates and bloggers. I once again call on the authorities to stop the continued persecution of media and free voices in the country."

Gulnara Akhundova of International Media Support stated:

“It’s important to recognise why so many NGOs are standing up in support of Emin – it’s because we’ve worked with him over the years so we know exactly how important his contribution has been. Emin is one of several brave people the world has depended on for information about human rights and press freedom in Azerbaijan, information that Azerbaijan’s government has been trying very hard to suppress. Making a commitment to the protection of Emin’s rights now would be an important signal to Azerbaijan’s government that the world is not deceived by the glitz of international sporting competitions.”

== Support initiatives ==
A support initiative for Emin Huseynov is launched by the Courage Foundation. The initiative is tasked to help support Emin Huseynov and to collect donations and funds to help him with his legal case.
