= Arzu Geybullayeva =

Azerbaijani journalist (born 1983)

- Arzu Qeybullayeva
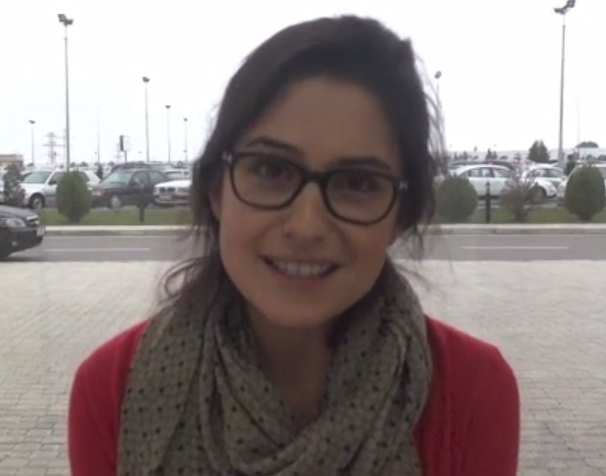
- Born: August 1, 1983 (age 42); Baku, Azerbaijan SSR, Soviet Union
- Other names: Arzu Geybulla
- Occupations: Journalist, blogger, and activist
- Organization(s): National Democratic Institute, European Stability Initiative
- Known for: civil society engagement

Arzu Geybulla gizi Geybullayeva (Azerbaijani: Arzu Qeybulla qızı Qeybullayeva), also known as Arzu Geybulla (Azerbaijani: Arzu Qeybulla), is an Azerbaijani columnist, blogger, and journalist for several newspapers and media news outlets including Al Jazeera, Foreign Policy, Global Voices, and Agos. She has also worked with several non-profit organizations and think-tanks including the National Democratic Institute and European Stability Initiative. Geybullayeva was included in the BBC's list of top women in 2014. She advocates a peaceful resolution among Armenians and Azerbaijanis over the Nagorno-Karabakh conflict. However, in recent years, she has received various threats mainly stemming from Azerbaijan due to her work with Agos, an Armenian newspaper. The threats were internationally condemned by various human rights organizations.

== Life and career ==
Arzu Geybullayeva was born in Baku, Azerbaijan in August 1983. Her father, Geybulla Geybullayev, was a professor. Geybullayeva received a B.A. degree in International Relations at Bilkent University in Ankara, Turkey. She furthered her studies at the London School of Economics and received a Master of Science in Global Politics. Geybullayeva then began her career as a researcher at the Oxford Business Group in London and was active in many projects in Africa and Asia, as well as providing a detailed market survey analysis of Libya. She has worked for the National Democratic Institute (NDI) in Baku. As part of NDI, she worked closely with local politicians and youth activists.

While in Istanbul in 2007, Geybullayeva began working for the European Stability Initiative, a non-profit research and policy institute and a think-tank for South East Europe. In September 2008, she started her blog called Flying Carpets and Broken Pipelines. Since 2009, she has become a contributing columnist to editorials for Osservatorio Balcani e Caucaso, a think-tank based in Italy.

She has been a co-director of the Imagine Center for Conflict Transformation since 2011, an organization that fosters relations between Armenians and Azerbaijanis. She is currently the managing editor of Neutral Zone, an internet platform which promotes cultural and social interaction, as well as conflict resolution among Armenians and Azerbaijanis. In regards to Armenian and Azerbaijani reconciliation, she remarked: "It is just like a building under construction – you set the base, so that the building can stand firmly."

Since 2013, Geybullayeva has been working as a correspondent for Agos, an Armenian bilingual weekly newspaper published in Istanbul. In the same year, she became an associate scholar for the Foreign Policy Research Institute, an American think-tank based in Philadelphia, Pennsylvania.

She was included in the British Broadcasting Corporation's (BBC) list of top women in 2014.

Arzu presently lives in Istanbul, Turkey. She speaks English, Azerbaijani, Turkish, and Russian.

== Threats and reactions ==
Geybullayeva has received numerous threats in various social media circles stemming from Azerbaijan over her cooperation with the Istanbul-based Armenian newspaper Agos. In an interview with Global Voices, she stated she was branded a "traitor" and that the blackmail escalated into death threats towards her and her family. The threats have caused her to refrain from visiting her native Azerbaijan then in a self-imposed exile in Turkey in 2015.

The threats were largely condemned by numerous international organizations including PEN International and its affiliates English PEN and PEN Center USA. PEN has called upon the Azerbaijani and Turkish government to "ensure her safety and to investigate all threats of violence made against her." The Index on Censorship has also condemned the threats and has called upon the "international community to put pressure on Azerbaijan to respect freedom of expression."
