= Shahla Humbatova =

Azerbaijani human rights lawyer (born 1976)

- Şəhla Knyaz qızı Hümbətova
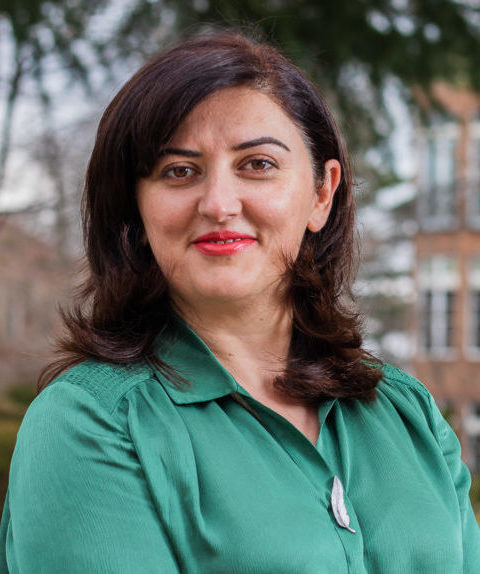
- Born: 4 September 1976 (age 49)
- Occupation: lawyer
- Known for: human rights advocacy

Shahla Knyaz gizi Humbatova (Azerbaijani: Şəhla Knyaz qızı Hümbətova) is an Azerbaijani human rights advocate and lawyer. After speaking out against prison conditions in Azerbaijan, she was disbarred from being a lawyer, which resulted in international protests. In 2020 she was recognised as an International Woman of Courage by U.S. Secretary of State Mike Pompeo.

== Life ==
Humbatova began practising law in Azerbaijan in 2013. She is one of few women who speaks out against the treatment of human rights advocates in Azerbaijan. She has attracted both criticism and admiration for defending LGBT rights. Her example encourages others to follow.

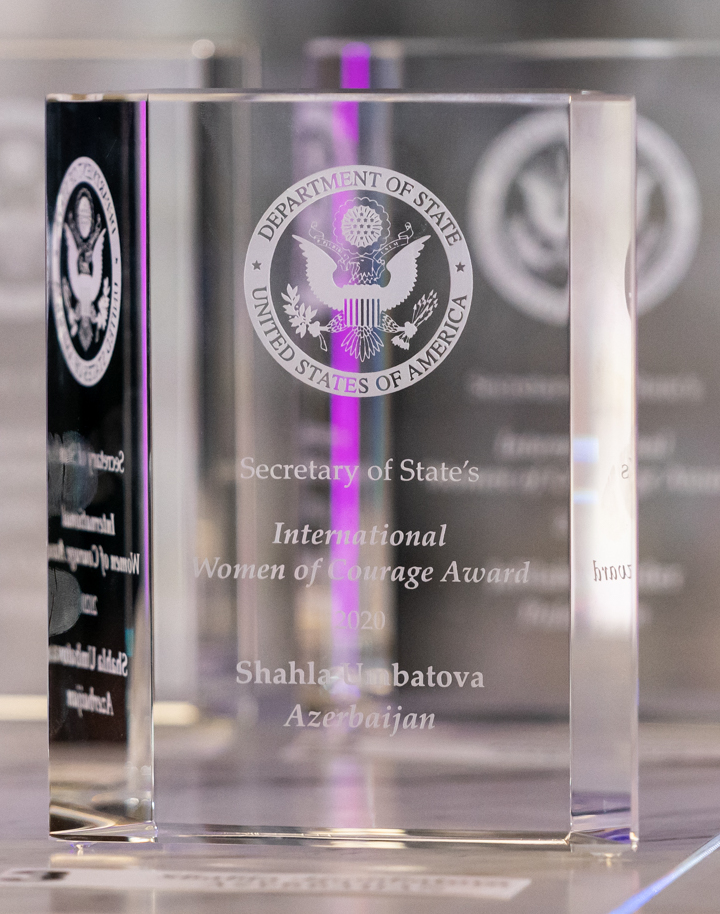
Humbatova's International Woman of Courage award

In 2019 she spoke publicly about the poor detention conditions of political prisoner and journalist Mehman Huseynov, who was her client. Humbatova was later cautioned for spreading false information by the penitentiary service, and the Azerbaijani Bar Association threatened proceedings. After this, the prison forbade her from accessing her clients. The Bar Association attracted international criticism for disbarring Humbatova. Critics included the International Bar Association's Human Rights Institute and Lawyers Lor lawyers. The bar association was asked to withdraw its decision, given the "arbitrary" nature of its charges.

She was given an award as an International Women of Courage on 4 March 2020, by the U.S. Secretary of State. Earle D. Litzenberger the US ambassador returned to Washington to support her as she received the award. She was the first person from Azerbaijan to win the award. She noted afterwards that she had been rewarded in the U.S. for the same thing that she had been punished for in Azerbaijan.
