= Aysel Umudova =

Azerbaijani journalist and political prisoner

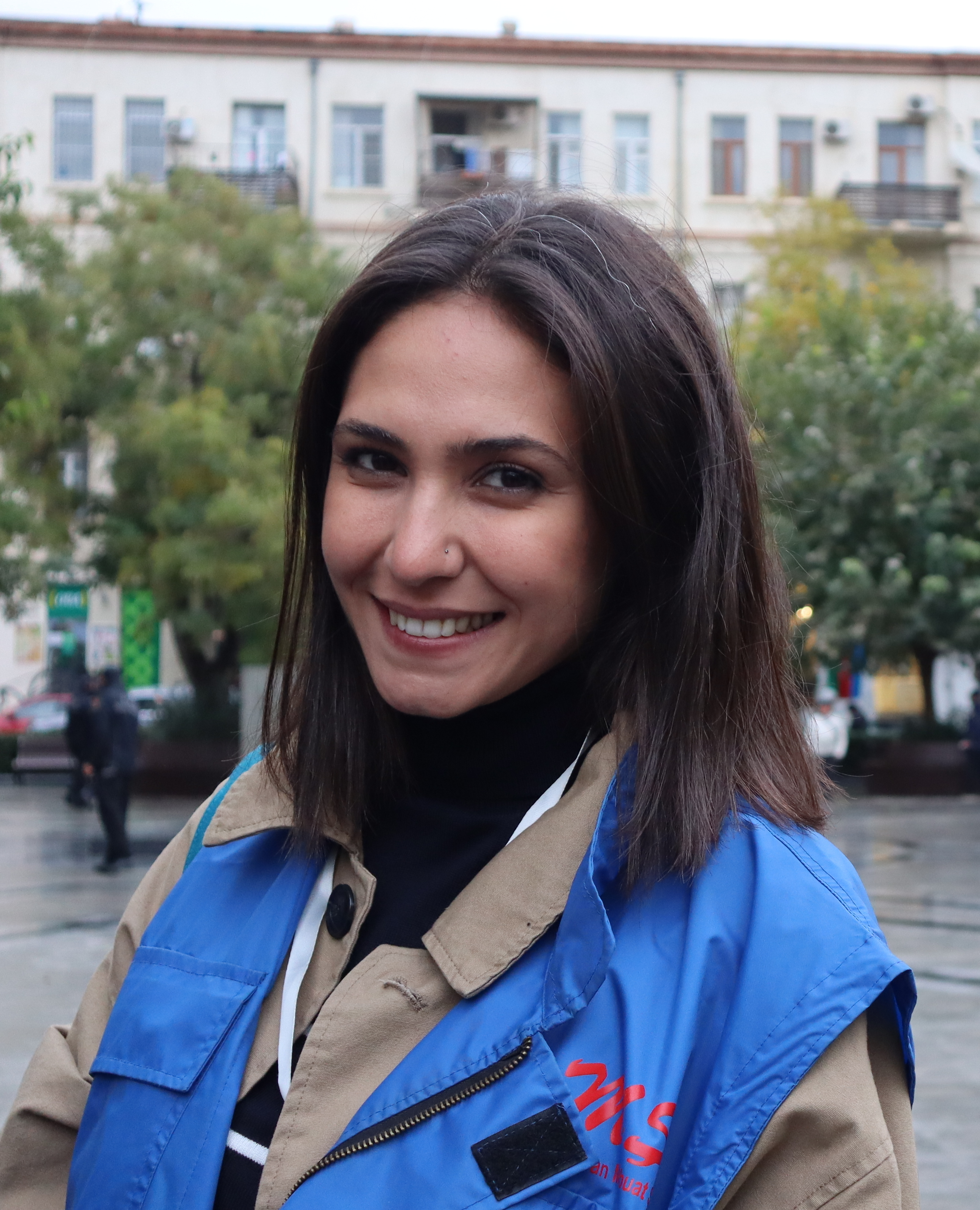
- Umudova in 2022
- Born: August 1, 1992 (age 33)
- Citizenship: Azerbaijan
- Occupation: Journalist
- Years active: 2014-

Aysel Shamsaddin gizi Umudova (born August 1, 1992) is an Azerbaijani journalist and political prisoner; a reporter for Meydan TV. She was arrested on December 6, 2024, as part of a criminal case opened against Meydan TV journalists. Aysel Umudova and six other journalists involved in the case were charged under Article 206.3.2 of the Criminal Code of Azerbaijan (smuggling on preliminary arrangement by group of persons).

She is currently held at the Baku Pretrial Detention Center under the Penitentiary Service of the Ministry of Justice.

== Early life and education ==
Aysel Umudova was born in 1992 in Azerbaijan. She began her higher education in sociology, but her studies were interrupted due to her arrest. In 2014, Umudova started working as a reporter for Meydan TV. From a young age, she showed a strong interest in social justice and decided to use her knowledge to contribute to society through journalism.

== Journalism career ==
Working with Meydan TV (a Berlin-based independent media platform), Umudova reported on various sensitive topics, including government corruption and civil society issues. She often covered public protests and human rights rallies. On March 8, 2021, during an International Women’s Day march in Baku, Umudova participated in and covered the women’s rights protest that was violently dispersed by police. After the rally, she publicly revealed that police had attempted to intimidate the participants by visiting their homes (even coming to an address they believed was hers). Umudova also reported on opposition demonstrations. In November 2022, while covering opposition protests in Baku, she was assaulted by police officers, suffering a leg injury despite wearing a press vest. On November 5, 2022, while covering another protest, Umudova and several other journalists were forcibly removed from the area by police using excessive force; as a result, their equipment was destroyed. In addition to her on-ground reporting, Umudova became a target of online harassment and smear campaigns. In early 2023, a pro-government social media group called “Tenqidci” (“Critic”) leaked private content and targeted several women activists. Umudova and another Meydan TV reporter, Aytaj Tapdig, were among those singled out.

== Arrest and detention ==
On December 6, 2024, amid a broader crackdown on independent media, Aysel Umudova was arrested by Baku police along with five other Meydan TV journalists as part of what became known as the “Meydan TV case.” She was charged under Article 206.3.2 of the Azerbaijani Criminal Code – “smuggling on preliminary arrangement by group of persons” specifically accused of conspiring to smuggle foreign currency. Observers noted the irony of this charge, as Umudova had long been under a travel ban that made any smuggling activity impossible. According to her lawyer, she was detained overnight and interrogated without legal counsel present raising concerns about due process violations. On December 8, the investigative authority's motion for the imposition of a pre-trial detention measure against Aysel Umudova was reviewed. The motions concerning the detention of each individual were examined separately by the Khatai District Court, presided over by Judge Sulhane Hajiyeva. The court granted the motions, and a pretrial detention order for a period of four months was issued against all detainees, including Aysel Umudova. Umudova has denied all charges, asserting that her arrest is retaliation for her journalistic work. “She stated that her arrest was directly related to her journalistic activities,” her lawyer reported after a court hearing. All six jailed journalists maintained their innocence and viewed the case as politically motivated, a stance echoed by local human rights defenders who immediately recognized them as de facto political prisoners. While in custody at Baku Pre-Trial Detention Center, Umudova’s health deteriorated. Reports in December 2024 indicated she suffered frequent panic attacks and stress-related illness; an ambulance was called twice due to spikes in her blood pressure and vomiting. Despite this, authorities declined motions to replace her incarceration with house arrest. In January and again in March 2025, court rejected appeals for Umudova’s release to house arrest, leaving her behind bars pending trial. By this time, the crackdown had widened to include other journalists (such as Fatima Movlamli and Nurlan Libre) in the same case.

== International attention ==
The arrest of Meydan TV journalists has drawn sharp criticism. Influential international organizations have called on the Azerbaijani authorities to release the journalists. Leaders of opposition parties in Azerbaijan — including the Azerbaijani Popular Front Party (APFP), the Musavat Party, the Republican Alternative Party (REAL), and the National Council of Democratic Forces — issued statements condemning the arrests of Meydan TV journalists.

The international human rights organization Amnesty International condemned the arrests. "We condemn the recent arrests and call on the Azerbaijani authorities to immediately release the journalists and media workers. We feared a crackdown following COP29, and now we urge the participating states of the UN conference to respond to the ongoing persecution in Azerbaijan — a country that still holds the COP29 presidency," the organization stated. Amnesty International emphasized that the recent arrests of independent journalists, including staff from Meydan TV, are part of a broader crackdown that began a year ago, aimed at silencing critical and independent voices.

The press freedom organization Reporters Without Borders (RSF) also condemned the arrests of Meydan TV staff. In a message on the RSF account on the X platform, it said: "Reporters Without Borders condemn these new arrests and call for the immediate release of them and 13 other journalists held in disgraceful conditions on fabricated charges."

The New York-based Committee to Protect Journalists (CPJ) likewise denounced the arrests of Meydan TV staff: "Azerbaijani authorities must immediately release Natig Javadli, Khayala Aghayeva, Aytaj Tapdig, Aynur Elgunesh, Aysel Umudova, and Ramin Deko — along with more than a dozen other leading journalists detained on similar charges in recent months — and put an end to this unprecedented assault on the independent press," CPJ emphasized.

The international media rights organization Article 19 also condemned the arrests: "Just weeks after the climate summit in Baku, at least seven journalists — most of them from Meydan TV — were detained. These repressions are a stark reminder that Azerbaijan does not tolerate criticism or dissent. We must continue resisting the pressure on press freedom," the organization posted on its X (formerly Twitter) account.

The human rights organization Freedom Now also joined calls to end the pressure on the independent press in Azerbaijan: "Azerbaijan continues to harshly persecute independent journalists. The latest act of repression is the detention of five Meydan TV journalists on clearly politically motivated grounds. We call for their immediate release and an end to this persecution," the organization stated on its X account.

Women Press Freedom (WPF) in its statement supported Meydan TV and all journalists in Azerbaijan who continue risking their safety to report the truth: "Silencing the press is an attack on democracy," the WPF statement said.

The UK Ambassador to Azerbaijan, Fergus Auld, also sharply criticised the arrests: “The detention of Meydan TV journalists at the end of the COP29 climate conference is a slap in the face to democratic governments,” he wrote on his official X account.

=== US State Department response ===
On December 11, 2024, United States Secretary of State Antony Blinken issued a special statement regarding the arrests of activists and journalists in Azerbaijan and called on the country’s authorities to release them. Baku accused Blinken of bias and rejected the claims of suppressing civil liberties. In his statement titled "Escalation of Repression Against Civil Society and Media in Azerbaijan," Blinken specifically mentioned Rufat Safarov, Sevinj Vagifgizi, Azer Gasimli, Farid Mehralizade, Bakhtiyar Hajiyev, recently detained Meydan TV staff, and many others arrested for their human rights work. The U.S. called on the Azerbaijani government to release them immediately, Blinken stated. "The United States is deeply concerned not only about these detentions but also about the increasing repression of civil society and media in Azerbaijan," the United States Department of State's statement emphasized. The Azerbaijani Ministry of Foreign Affairs responded negatively to Blinken’s statement, accusing the U.S. State Department of interfering in the country’s internal affairs. According to the ministry, such interference has continued "for the past four years," which has been "lost years for Azerbaijani-American relations."
