= 2011 Azerbaijani protests =

Pro-democracy, anti-corruption protests

- Date: 11 March 2011 – 11 September 2011 (6 months)
- Location: Azerbaijan
- Caused by: Corruption; Unemployment; Low wages; Authoritarianism; Political repression
- Goals: Democratic reforms; Release of political prisoners; Resignation of President Ilham Aliyev and Prime Minister Artur Rasizade
- Methods: Civil resistance, demonstrations, hunger strikes, online activism
- Result: Protests suppressed

Casualties
- Arrested: 469+

The 2011 Azerbaijani protests were a series of demonstrations held to protest the government of President Ilham Aliyev. Common themes espoused by demonstrators, many of whom were affiliated with Müsavat and the Popular Front Party, the main opposition parties in Azerbaijan, included doubts as to the legitimacy of the 2008 presidential election, calls for the release of political prisoners, for democratic reforms, and that Aliyev and his government resign from power. Azerbaijani authorities responded with a security crackdown, dispersing protests and curtailing attempts to gather with force and numerous arrests.

The European Union, the United States Department of State, Amnesty International, and other organizations called on the government to release political prisoners and allow freedom of assembly. Meanwhile, Azerbaijani Prosecutor General Zakir Qaralov vowed to "suppress" protests, comparing them to incidents in "other countries" and saying that the government would not allow them to go forward.

== Background ==
On 29 January, more than 100 activists and politicians not affiliated with the Azerbaijani government gathered in Baku to urge President Ilham Aliyev to dismiss the government and call snap elections. Several critics compared Aliyev to Egypt's then-President Hosni Mubarak and warned that Azerbaijan could face popular protests as part of a regional wave of civil unrest, though leaders of the Azerbaijani Popular Front Party and Müsavat stopped short of threatening to lead them personally.

Around the same time, 20-year-old web activist and APFP supporter Jabbar Savalan gained prominence for posting increasingly provocative invective against the government on Facebook and other social networking websites, eventually calling in early February for a "Day of Rage" modeled off the protests in Egypt, with major protests to be held in downtown Baku. Authorities reacted by arresting Savalanly in Sumqayit on 5 February and charging him with marijuana possession, a charge his supporters claimed was fabricated. Opposition groups called on authorities to release the young activist and compared his detention to the suppression of dissidents in Egypt and other countries, but police insisted the arrest was not political.

On 6 February, an unsanctioned protest was held at the Egypt–Azerbaijan Friendship Park outside Baku, in the suburb of Xırdalan. Several dozen rally-goers, mostly young men and women, waved signs and chanted slogans calling for Egyptian President Mubarak to step down, but also voiced dissent against several recently adopted Azerbaijani government policies, including price increases for services. Police dispersed the gathering within minutes, making no arrests.

== Political protests ==
=== March ===
Youth activists Elnur Majidli, Bakhtiyar Hajiyev, and others called on Facebook for mass protests on 11 March 2011 to mark the one-month anniversary of both Hosni Mubarak's resignation and the detention of Savalanly on what they called are trumped-up charges. In response, the government reportedly dispatched military forces to Baku to bolster security in the former Soviet republic's capital.

Members of the opposition in the National Assembly indicated support for the demonstrators, demanded the release of political prisoners, and called on the cabinet, led by former Communist Party member Prime Minister Artur Rasizade, to resign over its failure to institute reforms. The government claimed the demonstrations were organized by the parliamentary opposition under the guise of grassroots activism, but activists denied this, citing criticism from politically like-minded allies in the National Assembly over the date of the planned protests as an example of where they differ from the opposition parties.

==== 11 March – "The Great People's Day" ====
On 11 March, police foiled several attempted protests, arresting at least 43. The New York Times reported that about 60 people gathered in Baku, the capital city, in response to the scheduled event on Facebook, but security forces quickly clamped down, preventing the demonstration from gaining much steam.

==== 12 March ====
A larger protest in Baku, the capital city, drew several hundred people on 12 March, The New York Times reported. The protest was led by Müsavat, in contrast to the smaller youth-led demonstrations of the previous day. Once again, however, police were prepared for the rally and began arresting people on the spot, including at least one person for speaking to a Western journalist, though media reported they had a more difficult time subduing the larger, better-prepared protest than they had on 11 March. About 50 people were arrested on this second day of protests. Although most of the protesters appeared to be supporters of the secular, relatively pro-Western Müsavat and similar parties, a number of young protesters representing the Islamist opposition began chanting "Allahu Akbar", reportedly angering police on the scene.

At least 30 people arrested in connection with the protests were sentenced to time in prison, the United States Department of State reported. Müsavat demanded that President Ilham Aliyev step down over the incident. The Azerbaijani Human Rights House and the European Union, among others, criticised Aliyev's government and called on authorities to allow people to demonstrate peacefully.

==== Other incidents ====
Reuters reported that at least 150 activists were arrested in Azerbaijan during March, including those detained 11–12 March.

=== April ===
Opposition groups signaled their intention to hold additional protests in April in spite of warnings from authorities not to do so. Officials in Baku pushed government opponents to rally only in a designated part of Bebiheybat, outside the city center of Baku, but the opposition refused any deal by which protesters would not march in downtown Baku. Opposition leader Ali Karimli of the Azerbaijani Popular Front Party said that while activists intended to demonstrate peacefully, "In case of a provocation, however, we will not be responsible."

==== 2 April – "Day of Wrath" ====
Another protest was held on 2 April at Fountain Square in Baku's city center, with between 350 and 1,000 demonstrators in attendance. The APFP and Müsavat called the demonstration a "Day of Wrath" and led the rally downtown instead of holding it in a government-approved stadium on the outskirts of the city. Police arrested well over 200 demonstrators, detaining at least two Azerbaijani journalists covering the protest as well. Isa Gambar, the leader of Müsavat, responded to the crackdown and the government's charging of four opposition leaders with "organizing mass unrest" by vowing to intensify protests. On 10 October, four of the arrested activists were given sentences from 18 months to three years in prison.

==== 17 April ====
Police again dispersed an attempted demonstration in Baku's Fountain Square on 17 April, arresting activists chanting pro-democracy slogans, including a mother and her young daughter, and briefly detaining two or three Swedish journalists. The Swedes were later deported. One woman reportedly warned police as they arrested her, "Don't think you'll be able to keep your government. A 30-year-old government collapsed in Egypt." Officials said they detained 65 people in total. While the government again attempted to confine demonstrations to a small area on the outskirts of Baku, Gambar and other opposition leaders have vowed to continue holding protests in the city center in defiance of the law, as its requests to be allowed to gather in front of the Narimanov Cinema downtown were denied and the organizers rejected alternative settings proffered by the city council. The crackdown came in defiance of an appeal from human rights watchdog Amnesty International to allow peaceful protests to go forward.

==== 20 April ====
To commemorate the four-year anniversary of Azerbaijani journalist Eynulla Fatullayev, 20 journalists held a one-day hunger strike to protest what they view as his unjust imprisonment. "We want to demonstrate our complaints against the arrest of Eynulla Fatullayev [by striking]," said editor Aynur Elganesh.

=== May ===
Though action by the political opposition was subdued throughout the first half of the month, unrest continued in the capital of Baku.

==== 6 May ====
Police swiftly dispersed a protest on 6 May in Baku. Protesters called on the government to allow Muslim girls to wear the hijab in school. Several dozen were arrested, and police reportedly used batons and pepper spray to subdue some of the demonstrators.

==== 22 May ====
Youth activists rallied on Baku Boulevard to call for the release of "political prisoners", fellow activists imprisoned on what they believe are trumped-up charges. Four activists and a journalist covering the event were arrested, though the journalist was released later that same evening. The activists were sentenced to between seven and eight days of jail time each.

=== June ===
==== 19 June ====
Police arrested "23 of about 80 protesters" affiliated with the opposition Public Chamber in Baku in front of the Narimanov Cinema, a frequent site of attempted rallies against the government during the protests of 2011. Interior Minister Ehsan Zahidov insisted that the protesters, by gathering in front of the cinema instead of at the Bibi Heybat settlement on the outskirts of the city, were "violating the constitutional rights of citizens" and added, "If the Public Chamber rally set for 19 June [was] sanctioned by the Baku Mayor's Office and staged in a venue allotted by it, the police would provide security of rally participants." Police were present in the square an hour before protesters arrived, successfully thwarting the rally.

=== November ===
Around 30—35 opposition youth activists organised a protest in front of Baku's City Hall on 15 November chanting "Freedom!" but were soon violently confronted by police forces. The arrested activists were released within the next hours.

== Hijab protests ==
Hijab protests in Azerbaijan is a consequence of recently changes specially in formal and social aspects of Azerbaijan. The hijab ban in schools and arresting of social activists can be mentioned as these changes. The government of Azerbaijan arrested a few Leaders of Opposition and this caused a new round of protests and rallies inside the country. these parties include the Popular front of Azerbaijan, the Musavat Party, and the Islamic party. Leaders of these parties face long prison terms. Movsum Samadov, leader of the Islamic Party of Azerbaijan, has been charged with preparing an act of terror. Several Demonstrations and Rallies took place in Different cities of Azerbaijan Due to Islam-Fighting Policy of Azerbaijan's Government. Thousands of Azeri Muslims have held demonstrations to protest the new policy. Main dates of these protest include: 11 March, 2 April, 6 and 19 May and 10 December 2011. United States Ambassador, The European Union, Amnesty International, The International Press Institute and peoples of some cities of Iran expressed concern over the Azerbaijani government's response to protests in the county.

== Tactics ==
Protesters have used social networking sites such as Facebook to spread information about rallies, including when and where to meet. However, BBC News has noted that as many as 80 percent of Azerbaijanis do not use the Internet, which has perhaps contributed to relatively low turnout compared to protests in neighboring Armenia and Iran, among other places. A BBC analyst also remarked upon a strategy seen at the unsuccessful 17 April rally in Fountain Square, with demonstrators slowly gathering while at least initially trying to appear unorganized, very similar to a smart mob.

== Domestic response ==
The government has striven to keep rallies from gathering much strength, dispersing the initial youth-led protests on 11 March in some cases before they could even start. To accomplish this, authorities have ordered security forces to the scene of planned demonstrations, taking a proactive approach rather than reacting once protests actually break out. Police have generally not hesitated to detain and arrest anyone they judge to be a possible agitator, including Azerbaijanis seen talking to journalists, and on at least two occasions, they have detained journalists themselves.

Authorities have cited the relatively small scale of protests as proof that the Azerbaijani public supports the government and does not approve of the opposition parties. They frequently use the descriptor "radical" to characterize protesters and opposition leaders.

Government officials, including Prosecutor General Zakir Qaralov, have also accused opposition leaders like Ali Karimli and Isa Gambar of being agents of foreign governments. In response, Karimli said after being interrogated for over eight hours on 16 April, "Speaking about who we are working for, there is only one address: the people of Azerbaijan." While the government has attempted to publicly discredit the main opposition leaders, and both Karimli and Gambar have been summoned for questioning, neither has yet been arrested.

Other activists have been charged with such crimes as "inciting hatred". The government has warned the France-based blogger who first called for the 11 March protests on Facebook that he will be prosecuted and could face up to 12 years in prison if he returns to Azerbaijan. His family has reportedly also faced consequences, with his father and cousins briefly being detained and the government allegedly pressuring his parents' employers to fire them from their jobs.

On 25 April, police raided the offices of Gambar's party Müsavat in Baku.

In mid-May, a top official with the ruling New Azerbaijan Party claimed the only young protesters attending rallies were relatives of opposition leaders, who he said "must step aside and give their place to a new generation and build new relations" because they "have no popular trust" and have failed to offer new ideas since the 1990s. He also said he believed the government's efforts to curb corruption, a key complaint of protesters, were sincere and making an impact. Claims to the contrary, he said, were "senseless".

On 26 May, Aliyev issued an unexpected presidential pardon to journalist Eynulla Fatullayev after four years of imprisonment. Fatullayev was duly released from prison. In an interview the next day, he said that if the government guaranteed freedom of the press and promised him he would not be punished for his reporting, he would return to work as a journalist in Azerbaijan.

The government put four APFP members, one Müsavat activist, and an unaffiliated anti-government demonstrator on trial on 13 July over their alleged role in organizing protests. Defense lawyers argued that the protests were peaceful and not disruptive, said plainclothes men who helped police to detain the protesters should be subpoenaed for questioning, and suggested Baku city officials violated protesters' right to freedom of assembly by denying permission for the protests, but their arguments were rejected by the judge.

=== Counter-demonstrations ===
Trend News Agency reported that about 100 young Azerbaijanis gathered in front of Karimli's house on 13 April to demonstrate against the APFP leader's role in organizing protests. The rally was reportedly broken up by police, with two protesters being detained, as it was officially unsanctioned.

== International reaction ==
United States Ambassador to Azerbaijan Matthew Bryza expressed concern over the Azerbaijani government's response to protests in March. On 15 April, Bryza denied the government's accusations that the Obama administration supports revolution in the South Caucasian republic. Bryza admitted that U.S. diplomats in Baku had met with Ali Karimli and Isa Gambar in early April, but said he had not been party to the talks and they did not constitute official U.S. backing for the opposition's goals. "Our desire is to step up sustainable activity and reform," Bryza said. The United States Department of State has also issued separate admonishments to the Azerbaijani government, seen as a vital U.S. ally in the region, to allow its citizens to assemble peacefully and to guarantee due process for the detained.

The European Union criticized Azerbaijan for "lack of respect of fundamental freedoms" after the 2 April rally was broken up by security forces. The supranational body called on authorities to allow for freedom of speech, free assembly, and freedom of the press, rights it suggested the government's response disrespected. On 13 April, Azerbaijani Foreign Minister Elmar Mammadyarov summoned the head of the EU delegation to Azerbaijan to express his government's displeasure over the statement. On 12 May, the European Parliament adopted a resolution in which it sharply condemned the government crackdown and called for the release of political prisoners.

Amnesty International also prevailed upon the government to allow peaceful protests. In a letter published in British daily The Guardian on 20 April, its UK affiliate called for the release of Eynulla Fatullayev and other detained journalists and insisted Baku should "comply with international standards on human rights – specifically the right to assembly and the right to free expression". The International Press Institute echoed Amnesty's criticisms, condemning the Azerbaijani government's deportation of three Swedish journalists for reporting on the demonstration in Fountain Square on 17 April.

At least one political analyst, a Dubai-based consultant on energy issues, suggested the Iranian government may have lent covert backing to protests. He said Iran has a vested interest in discouraging foreign investment in Azerbaijan, a regional rival for oil and natural gas exports, and Tehran may have sought to spook investors by attempting to destabilize the country.

Many activists demanded a boycott of the 2012 Eurovision song Contest after Azerbaijan won in 2011, but it never materialized.
