= Öksüzlü =

Öksüzlü or Oysyuzlyu or Oysuzlu may refer to:

- Aşağı Öksüzlü, Azerbaijan
- Yuxarı Öksüzlü, Azerbaijan
