= Rauf Arifoğlu =

Azerbaijani journalist

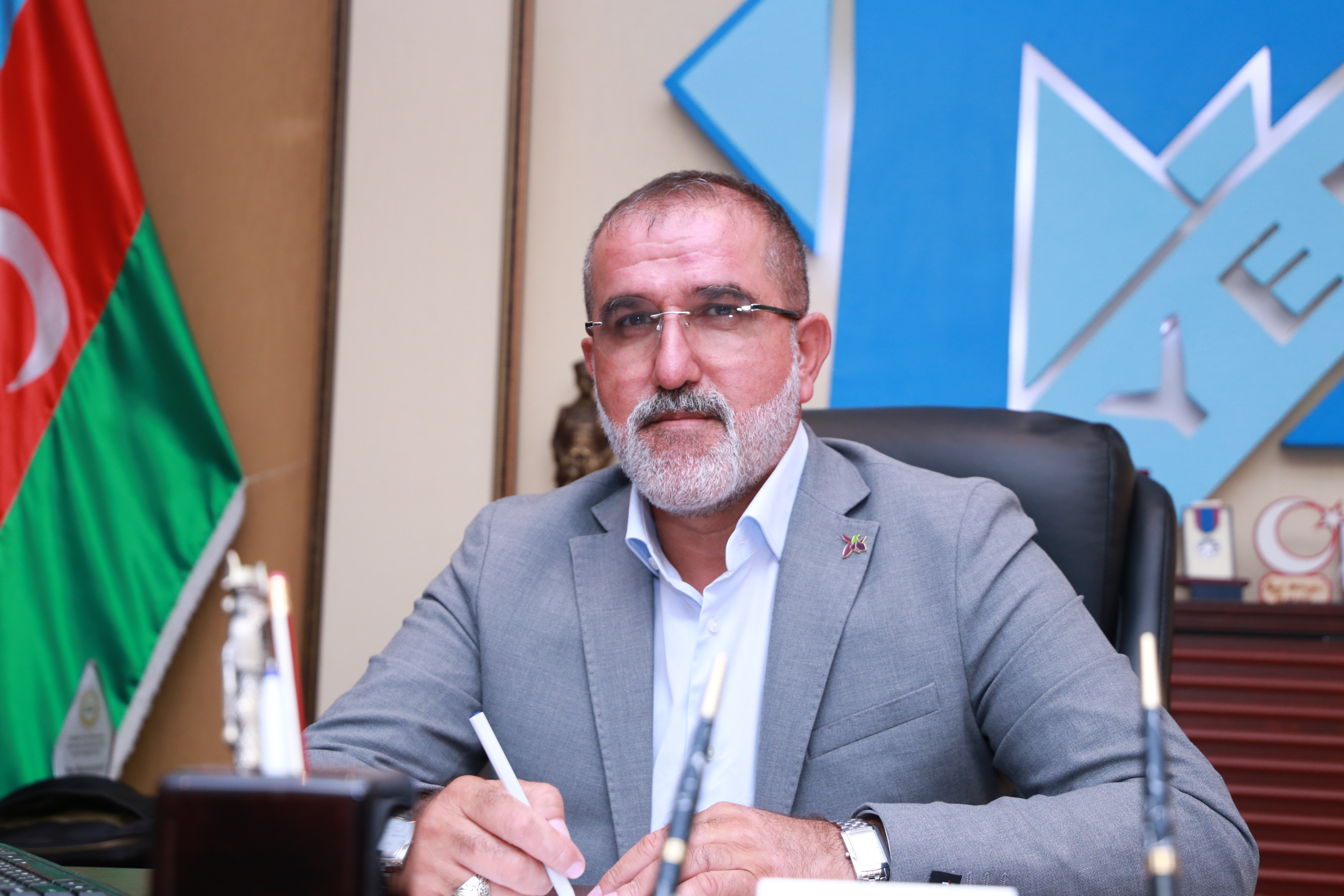
- Rauf Arifoğlu (2021)
- Born: Rauf Arif oghlu Abbasov; July 23, 1966 (age 60); Yuxarı Öysüzlü, Tovuz District
- Occupation: Journalist
- Years active: 1989–present

Rauf Arif oghlu Abbasov (born July 23, 1966, Yuxarı Öysüzlü, Tovuz District), known as Rauf Arifoğlu, is an Azerbaijani journalist. He is the founder and head of the Yeni Musavat Media Group. In 1988, he joined the national liberation movement. In 1989, he unofficially published "Birlik Magazine". In 1989, he founded the "Yeni Musavat" (New Equality) newspaper. At the same time, he founded the Azerbaijan National Democratic New Musavat Party (ANDNMP). In 1992, he and several members of the Popular Front of Azerbaijan re-established the Musavat Party (Equality Party), and AMDNMP joined Musavat. At different times he was a member of the Divan (Supreme body) of Musavat, and deputy chairman. He resigned from the membership of the party on July 15, 2015.

Rauf Arifoğlu was a candidate for the parliamentary elections several times. He was imprisoned several times for his political activities. And he was recognized as a political prisoner by many international organizations. His last parliamentary candidacy was controversial. All Azerbaijani media wrote about this right. The election in that region was cancelled.

== Life ==
Rauf Arif oghlu Abbasov was born on July 23, 1966, in Yuxarı Öysüzlü village of Tovuz District. In 1983, he graduated from the high school of this village. In 1983–1988 he graduated from the Azerbaijan Institute of Technology majoring in engineering technologist, and in 1994–1996 he graduated from the Faculty of World Politics and Economics of Western University majoring in political science.

== Socio-political activity ==
Arifoğlu joined the Azerbaijan National Freedom Movement in 1988. In late 1989, he unofficially published "Birlik Magazine". On November 10, 1989, he founded the "Yeni Musavat" newspaper. At the same time, he was one of the five founders of the Azerbaijan National Democratic New Musavat Party (AMDP "New Musavat"), the organization's secretary for ideological issues. The Central Office of the Party and the secret editorial office of the "Yeni Musavat" newspaper were moved to Ganja from December 1989 to the end of 1991. At that time, people's resistance groups were fighting against the Armenian-Russian saboteurs around Ganja, specifically in Chaykand village in the territory of Khanlar District (now Goygol). The first volunteer armed group of "New Musavat" was formed with the close participation of Arifoğlu. The group was headed by Safar Humbatov, a veteran of the Afghan war and a refugee from Western Azerbaijan. In one of the battles in which the group participated, on January 12, 1990, members of the AMDP "New Musavat" Bakhtiyar Aliyev, Ruzigar Gasimov, Abbasgulu Mammadov, Neman Valiyev and others were killed in the direction of Chaykand-Todan. The youth gathered around Arifoğlu and the "Yeni Musavat" newspaper and his party played an important role in organizing the protection and defense of the western regions of Azerbaijan.

In December 1991, the "Yeni Musavat" newspaper was officially registered. Since then, the newspaper's editorial office has been moved to Baku, to the headquarters of the Popular Front of Azerbaijan in the "Sahil baghi". At that time, the chairman of the Popular Front of Azerbaijan, Abulfaz Elchibey, allocated two rooms in the building of the organization for the establishment of the first editorial office of the newspaper.

As a result of Arifoğlu's close relations and talks with Elchibay, in January 1992, several people in the leadership of the Popular Front of Azerbaijan left the organization with the blessing of Elchibay and deputy Isa Gambarov (Isa Gambar) and formed a joint commission to restore the Musavat Party. The Rehabilitation Bureau was established, consisting of 5 people from "New Musavat" and 5 people from the Popular Front of Azerbaijan, and then its membership was expanded with the participation of the National Center in Ankara. As a result, in June 1992, the Musavat Party was officially returned to Azerbaijan, restored and became a partner in power. Arifoğlu was elected press and information secretary of this historic organization at the Restoration Congress. At the same time, he was one of the seven members of the executive committee of the Popular Front of Azerbaijan, the head of the Press and Information Department of the Popular Front of Azerbaijan. Arifoğlu, one of President Elchibay's most trusted sources of information, also founded the organization's new newspaper, "Jumhuriyat", in January 1993. "Yeni Turan" newspaper and "Dunya" magazine are among the media organizations established by Arifoğlu at that time. He was the leader of the Musavat Party until 2006. Since 2006, the press has focused more on activity. In February 2009, he removed his newspaper from Musavat's headquarters and opened a new editorial office, and its main press success began after that date. The newspaper's independence allowed him to normalize relations with the government.

He turned the electronic supplement of the "Yeni Musavat" newspaper into an independent information portal called Musavat.com, and then, in 2013, created a new media brand. He founded the Russian-language website Minval.az and its editorial office, and today the "Minval" brand successfully operates as an information agency providing news services in both Russian and Azerbaijani languages. He also has serious success in building social media segments of the "Yeni Musavat" and "Minval" brands.

One of his latest successes is the establishment of an internet television called Musavat TV and its transformation into a powerful platform. At present, Yeni Musavat Media Group has 1 newspaper, 5 websites, 1 TV (200,000 subscriptions), 3 large Facebook pages, 2 Instagram and 2 Telegram pages on the YouTube platform. All this is managed by a mobile team of 60 people.

Arifoğlu has been in politics for 33 years; At the same time, it has been operating continuously in the media sector for 32 years.

== Awards ==
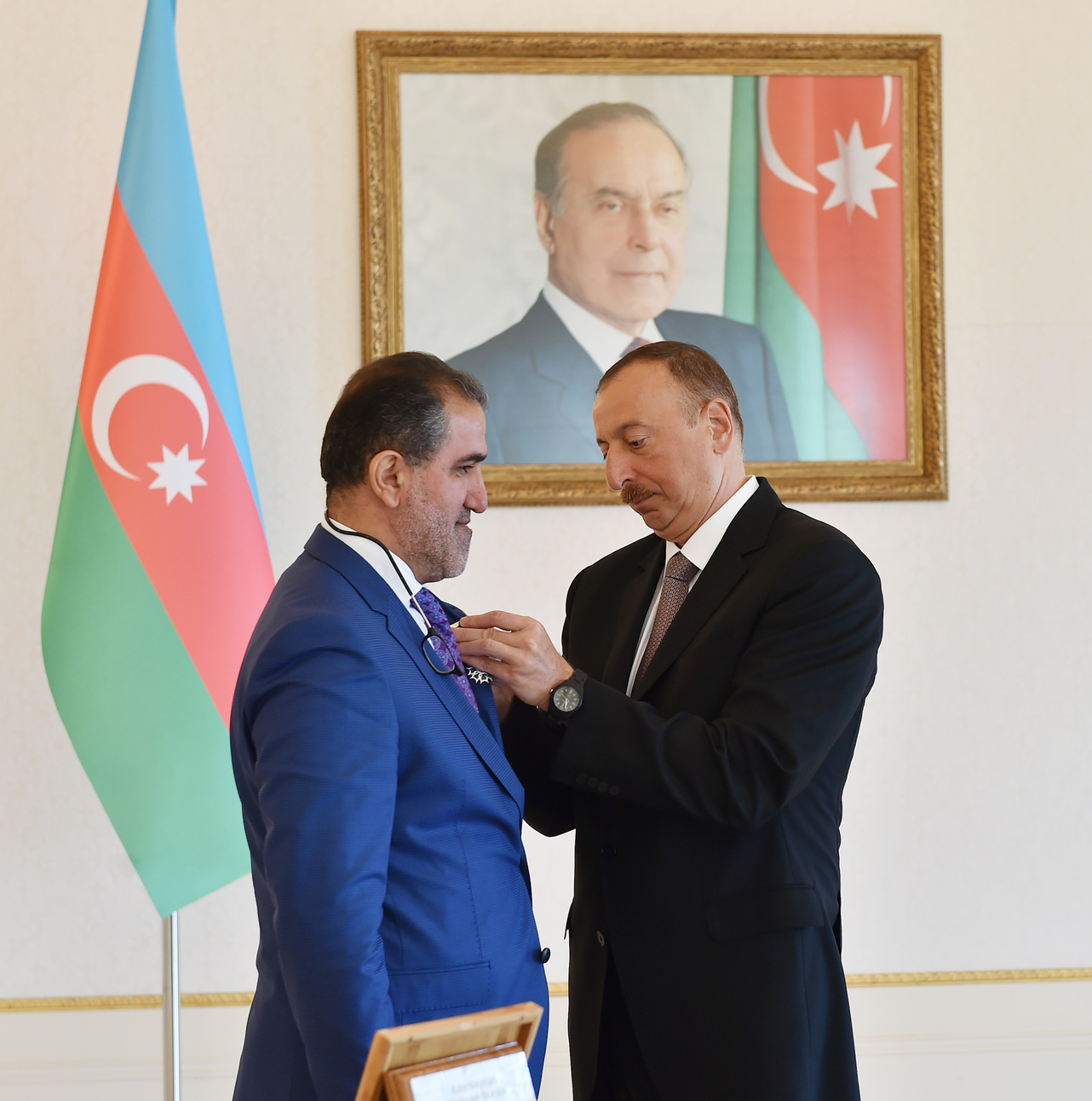
While receiving an award from President Ilham Aliyev.

He was awarded the Supreme Media Award established by the Press Council of Azerbaijan in 2011.

On July 22, 2015, he was awarded the honorary title of Honored Journalist by the President of Azerbaijan Ilham Aliyev for his activities in the field of journalism. On May 27, 2019, he was awarded the anniversary medal "100th anniversary of the Azerbaijan Democratic Republic" by another presidential decree.

On July 27, 2016, he was awarded the Mirza Jalil Higher Media Award.

In July 2017, he was awarded the Seyid Jafar Peshevari Award by the Congress of South Azerbaijan.

He was awarded the "Memorial Medal" by the Congress of European Azerbaijanis on July 22, 2020.

In addition, Arifoğlu was awarded certificates and plaques by a number of Turkish and Azerbaijani NGOs.

== Family ==
He is married and has 3 children.

== See also ==
- Eynulla Fatullayev
- Elmar Huseynov
