= 2026 Azerbaijani protests =

Series of demonstrations in Azerbaijan in 2026

- Part of Protests against hijab ban in Azerbaijan
- Date: 21 September 2026 – present
- Location: Azerbaijani cities and villages: Baku, Jalilabad, Sumgait, etc.
- Caused by: New "secular" dress codes in Azerbaijani schools banning hijab
- Goals: Repealing rules banning wearing hijab
- Methods: Demonstrations, Internet activism
- Result: Arrests; Ban on social media

Parties
(Azerbaijan) Protesters	Government of Azerbaijan; Ministry of Internal Affairs; National Police; Rapid Police Unit

Lead figures
None	(Azerbaijan) Ilham Aliyev (Azerbaijan) Mehriban Aliyeva (Azerbaijan) Ali Asadov

Number
Unknown	Unknown

Casualties and losses
200 protesters detained	Unknown

The 2026 Azerbaijani protests are a series of protests that started from September 21st across various cities and towns in Azerbaijan. They erupted in response to the ban on wearing hijab in schools by Azerbaijani government and have been described as one of the largest anti-government protests in Azerbaijan in recent years.

Azerbaijan, although a Muslim-majority country, is a secular state, which has previously debated balancing religious freedom and secular education. The similar protests happened in 2010-2012 over restrictions on wearing headscarves in educational institutions. The Azerbaijani pro-government media defended the hijab ban by presenting it as a way to protect Azerbaijan's secular education system, while portraying the protesters as "Iranian provocateurs", linking conservative Islam to Tehran amid strained Azerbaijan–Iran relations. Public demonstrations are rare in Azerbaijan, with demonstrations unsanctioned by the government facing serious restrictions. The event strained relations with Azerbaijan's long-standing ally, Turkey, as Turkish President Recep Tayyip Erdoğan spoke against the hijab ban in unspecified country in his UN General Assembly speech immediately after the adoption of new rules in Azerbaijan, while Oktay Saral, a chief adviser to Erdoğan, and several MPs from Turkey's ruling Justice and Development Party were more explicit in their criticism of new Azerbaijani regulations. In response, the Azerbaijan's ruling New Azerbaijan Party issued a statement telling Turkey to stay out of Azerbaijan's internal affairs. The event added further tension between Azerbaijan and Turkey, with the New Azerbaijan Party linking the Turkish reaction to previous Turkish criticism of Azerbaijan's ties with Israel.

== History ==
On 21 September 2026, the Azerbaijani Cabinet of Ministers amended the rules on uniforms in public schools, prohibiting "clothing items that violate the uniform dress code or are considered inconsistent with the secular principle of general education". Although the ban did not explicitly mention hijab, although the reports suggested those girls wearing hijab were turned away from schools. In September 2026, a video circulated online alleging that the hijab had been banned in Azerbaijani schools. The video shows girls wearing the hijab being prevented from entering middle school.

On October 6, 2026, new regulations were approved for the clothing of public school teachers, “educators’ clothing must comply with the principle of the secular nature of education.” After the new rules were adopted, teachers in Baku and Sumgayit said that school administrators had asked them to remove their hijabs or resign.

== See also ==
- Islamic veiling practices by country
- List of protests in the 21st century
