= Tofig Yagublu =

Azerbaijani politician (born 1961)

- Azerbaijani: Tofiq Yaqublu
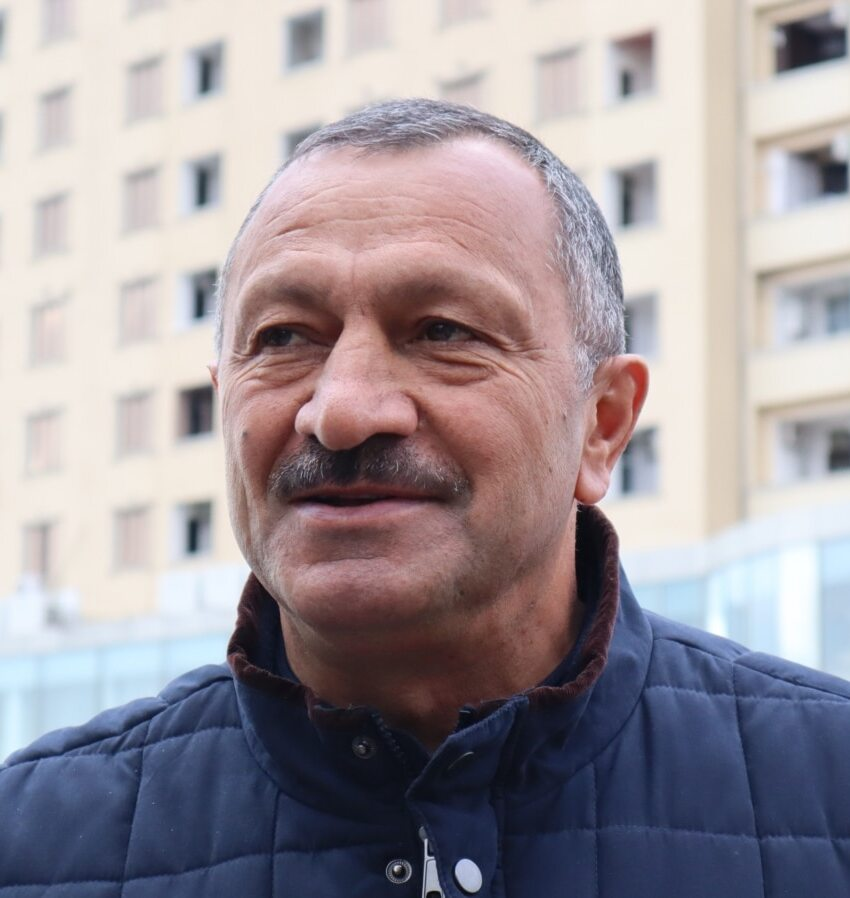

Deputy head of the executive power of the Binagadi District
- In office 1992–1993
- President: Abulfaz Elchibey

Deputy chairman of the Musavat Party
- In office 2010–2018
- President: Isa Gambar; Arif Hajili

Personal details
- Born: 5 February 1961 (age 65) Shua-Bolnisi, Georgian SSR, Soviet Union
- Citizenship: Azerbaijan
- Party: Musavat
- Spouse: Maya Yagublu
- Children: Nigar, Nargiz, Rahim
- Parent: Rashid Yagublu (father)
- Education: Azerbaijan University of Cooperation

Military service
- Allegiance: Armed Forces of Azerbaijan
- Branch/service: Azerbaijani Land Forces
- Battles/wars: First Nagorno-Karabakh War

Tofig Rashid oghlu Yagublu (Azerbaijani: Tofiq Rəşid oğlu Yaqublu; born 1961), is an Azerbaijani politician, journalist, former deputy chairman of the Musavat Party (2010–2018), and a member of the coordinating center of the National Council of Democratic Forces (NCDF).

Arrested and imprisoned several times, Amnesty International has recognized Yagublu as a prisoner of conscience. In March 2025, he was sentenced to 9 years in prison on what the Human Rights Watch called "bogus smuggling charges".

== Personal life ==
Tofig Rashid oglu Yagublu was born on 6 February 1961, in the Azerbaijani-populated village of Injaoglu (Shua-Bolnisi), then Georgian SSR of the Soviet Union. In 1989, he applied for withdrawal from the membership of the CPSU. He took part in the First Nagorno-Karabakh War, and was twice presented for the title of National Hero of Azerbaijan, but in the end, was not awarded for various reasons. In 2012, the Yeni Musavat online newspaper began publishing Yagublu's war diary.

He is married and has two daughters and a son. In 2012, one of Yagublu's daughters, Nigar Hazi, was imprisoned. His other daughter, Nargiz Yagublu, died in 2015.

== Political activity ==
Yagublu joined Musavat in 1992. During the presidency of Abulfaz Elchibey, Yagublu was the first deputy head of the executive power of the Binagadi District, Baku.

== Arrests ==
Yagublu has been arrested several times since 1998 when he was sentenced to two years of suspended imprisonment for participating in protests. On 4 February 2013, he was sentenced to five years in prison for participating in the anti-government protests. On 17 March 2016, he was pardoned by a presidential decree. In 2014, the Shaki Court of Grave Crimes sentenced Yagublu to five years in prison, officially for inciting mass violence. In October 2019, Yagublu was detained for 30 days, for disobeying police orders during peaceful protests, according to the official narrative.

=== Arrest in 2020 ===
According to the Ministry of Internal Affairs of Azerbaijan, on 22 March 2020, at about 15:00 in the Nizami District of Baku, a Toyota Corolla driven by Tofig Yagublu collided with a Lada Riva driven by Elkhan Jabrayilov. However, Yagublu's daughter, Nigar Hazi told that when he was in his parked car, another car drove into him, while Elkhan Jabrailov, who was driving, rushed to Yagublu with claims.

Nemat Kerimli, one of Yagublu's advocates, claimed that the investigators were biased and explained that the police had "seized Yagublu's mobile phone and wouldn't return it. Yagublu had recorded to his phone how, after the road accident, he was attacked by the man, who was later recognized to be a victim." Nevertheless, head of the press-service of the Ministry of Internal Affairs Ehsan Zahidov said that "even though the accident was caused by Tofig Yagublu, he started a conflict and beat Elkhan Jabrayilov and his wife Javahir Jabrayilova with fists and a wrench, causing them injuries of varying severity."

The Nizami District Police Office opened a criminal case under Article 221.3 of the Criminal Code of Azerbaijan (Hooliganism, using weapons or items used as weapons if this was accompanied by violence against the victim or destruction or damage to other people's property). Tofig Yagublu was detained as a suspect.

The next day, Tofig Yagublu was remanded in custody for three months and taken to Prison 3. However, he did not accept the criminal case against him and said that he was "slandered". He said that he treated the trial as biased and "fulfilling the political order" of the Azerbaijani leadership. His daughter Nigar Hazi also denied all charges. On 21 May, Human Rights Watch urged the Azerbaijani authorities to set Tofig Yagublu free.

On 1 September 2020, the public prosecutor spoke at the trial in the Nizami District Court, chaired by Judge Nariman Mehdiyev, and requested that Tofig Yagublu be sentenced to four years and six months in prison. On 2 September, Yagublu accused the court and the authorities of fabricating charges, then declared that he will start a hunger strike in protest against this arbitrariness. On 3 September 2020, Yagublu was sentenced to four years and three months in prison.

=== Arrest in 2021 ===
On 3 December 2021, Azerbaijan police violently dispersed a peaceful protest in central Baku, detaining dozens of protesters, including Yagublu, who alleged that police severely beat him while videoing him and demanded that he say on camera that he would stop criticizing Azerbaijan’s leadership. Human Rights Watch stated that he was beaten in the police station and then again while being driven to the outskirts of Baku, being dumped 70 km outside the city center, and that "his face and body showed clear signs of abuse."

On 15 December 2021, Amnesty International said that Yagublu was re-arrested, describing arrest as an attack on government critics and basic freedoms in Azerbaijan

== International response to imprisonment ==
Responding to a question at a briefing on 9 January 2023 about the most recent detention of Yagublu and fellow activist Bakhtiyar Hajiyev, U.S. State Department spokesperson Ned Price said that the Department was "deeply troubled by the arrest and detention of Bakhtiyar Hajiyev and Tofig Yagublu". Price urged the Azerbaijani authorities to "release them expeditiously" and "respect its citizens’ right, including the rights to express views peacefully."

== See also ==
- Human rights in Azerbaijan
