= Elnur =

Elnur is a given name. Notable people with the name include:

- Elnur Abduraimov (born 1994), Uzbek Kazakh boxer in the lightweight division
- Elnur Allahverdiyev (born 1983), football defender from Azerbaijan
- Elnur Amanov (born 1977), Azerbaijani taekwondo athlete
- Elnur Aslanov (born 1977), Azerbaijani political scientist, author and businessman
- Elnur Aslanov (wrestler) (born 1983), Azerbaijani wrestler
- Elnur Hüseynov (born 1987), Azerbaijani singer
- Elnur Jafarov (born 1997), Azerbaijani football player
- Elnur Majidli, Azerbaijani democracy activist and blogger based in Paris, France
- Elnur Mammadli (born 1988), Azerbaijani judoka
