= Protests against hijab ban in Azerbaijan =

The Hijab protests in Azerbaijan are a consequence of changes in the formal and social aspects of Azerbaijan with the banning of the hijab in schools and universities. The hijab ban led to protests by some religious activists and to their subsequent arrests, due to their opposition to the new laws.

== Background ==
The two main factors in the protests were Azerbaijan's hijab ban and the arrests of religious activists.

=== Hijab ban in schools ===
On December 10, 2010, Misir Mardanov, from the Azerbaijan's Education Ministry, announced the ban on hijab. According to the new law, students are forbidden to wear hijabs in schools and universities. The government also brought Soviet-era uniforms back into schools.

The Republic of Azerbaijan is a secular state. The hijab was effectively banned in schools by rules defining what kind of uniforms pupils should wear in this mainly Shiite Muslim country, which emerged as one of the most secular in the Islamic world after decades of Soviet rule.

In September 2026, a video circulated online alleging that the hijab had been banned in Azerbaijani schools. The video shows girls wearing the hijab being prevented from entering middle school.

On October 6, 2026, new regulations were approved for the clothing of public school teachers, “educators’ clothing must comply with the principle of the secular nature of education.” After the new rules were adopted, teachers in Baku and Sumgayit said that school administrators had asked them to remove their hijabs or resign.

On 14 October 2026, Al Jazeera reported that Gulshan Aliyeva, an English teacher with 23 years of experience, had been prevented from entering her school in Baku while wearing a headscarf. Her daughter was also barred from entering school, Aliyeva said. She planned to raise the issue with the relevant authorities, arguing that her religious beliefs should not prevent her from working or her daughter from attending school.

== Arrest of religious activists ==
The government of Azerbaijan arrested several leaders of the religious opposition and this caused a new round of protest by their supporters which led to them being arrested. The Parties involved included: the Popular Front, Musavat Party and Islamic Party. Leaders of these parties face long prison terms. Movsum Samadov, leader of the banned Islamic Party of Azerbaijan, was charged with preparing an act of terror.

== Protests and further arrests ==
Several demonstrations and rallies took place in different cities of Azerbaijan to protest against the policies of the Azerbaijan government, which resulted in a new arrest wave. Anti-government activists used social media to call for street protests inspired by the Arab uprisings on Friday March 11, 2011. Activists inspired by the overthrow of autocrats in Tunisia and Egypt by pro-democracy protests vowed to stage more demonstrations as they were being arrested by police outside Baku's Oil Academy.

Azerbaijan security forces detained 43 people in the event.

On Saturday the 2nd of April 2011, another protest took place. Riot police seized protesters near the Fountains Square in Baku, where the opposition had wanted to hold a rally but failed to receive approval from the authorities. One of the opposition leaders said after the protest that about 1,000 people had taken part and more than 200 were arrested.

On 6 May 2011, some protesters in Baku chanted "God is great" and "Freedom to hijab", before being arrested by the police.

Following the implementation of the hijab ban in October 2026, protests began in Azerbaijani schools in Baku and other cities, Female students demanding respect for their right to education. In some schools, male students also did not attend classes in support of girls wearing the hijab. “In a village in the Sabunchi district of Baku, students protested, carrying placards with the slogan ‘The hijab is not a barrier to education.’” TikTok and Instagram access was also reportedly blocked. The Interior Ministry said 37 people were arrested during the protests in Baku.

On 16 October, Amnesty International called for the release of people detained for peacefully protesting restrictions on hijab in schools. It also reported that Baku-based activist and artist İlkin Hüseynov had gone missing on 14 October after leaving home with unidentified people. Huseynov had set up a free online platform connecting volunteer teachers with children who had been excluded from school, including over the hijab restrictions. DW later reported, citing local media and people close to Huseynov, that he had been placed in administrative detention for 30 days on suspicion of disobeying police orders.

Amnesty International also reported several other cases of detention linked to the protests. Gudrat Abdullayev was sentenced to 25 days of administrative arrest over a TikTok post, while Rafael Huseynzade was detained for 30 days after writing “Freedom for the hijab!” on a school building. The organization also reported that six minors had been detained on suspicion of attempting to set fire to a school.

== International reactions ==
There were international protests against the government's actions.

=== Europe ===
- The European Union criticized Azerbaijan for "lack of respect of fundamental freedoms" after the 2 April rally was broken up by security forces. The supranational body called on authorities to allow for freedom of speech, free assembly, and freedom of the press, rights it suggested the government's response disrespected. On 13 April, Azerbaijani Foreign Minister Elmar Mammadyarov summoned the head of the EU delegation to Azerbaijan to express his government's displeasure over the statement.

=== Iran ===
- 6 February 2011, Thousands of people and students of girls' schools in Tabriz gathered in front of the Consulate of the Republic of Azerbaijan in Tabriz and announced their protest against the banning of the Islamic hijab in secondary schools of the Republic of Azerbaijan. Participating students announced their support for veiled students of Azerbaijan by chanting Persian and Turkish slogans such as "Prohibition of hijab and covering is a betrayal of the Qur'an", "The statement banning hijab should be canceled", "Muslim student we support you".
- The Iranian Ayatollahs have criticized Azerbaijan's decision to ban the hijab.
- The conference "Opposition to the Hijab Ban in the Republic of Azerbaijan" was held on 2 May 2021 in Jamkaran Mosque.

=== Turkey ===
Oktay Saral, an advisor to Turkish President Recep Tayyip Erdoğan, wrote on the social media platform X: “Leaving a student who covers her head for reasons of faith at the school gate – how can this fit into any conscience, any sense of justice?” He also said: “We expect Azerbaijan to reverse this mistake as soon as possible.”

Protests against the restrictions also took place in Türkiye. Al Jazeera reported that demonstrators gathered outside Azerbaijan’s consulate in Istanbul, calling on the authorities to reconsider the school dress rules. The dispute also drew criticism from Turkish presidential adviser Oktay Saral, whose comments prompted a response from Azerbaijan’s ruling New Azerbaijan Party.

=== Human rights organizations ===
- Amnesty International has also called upon the government to allow peaceful protests. In a letter published in The Guardian on 20 April, its UK affiliate called for the release of Eynulla Fatullayev and other detained journalists and insisted the government should "comply with international standards on human rights – specifically the right to assembly and the right to free expression". The International Press Institute echoed Amnesty's criticisms, condemning the Azerbaijani government's deportation of three Swedish journalists for reporting on the 17 April demonstration in Fountain Square.

== See also ==
- Islamic veiling practices by country
