= Jabbar Savalan =

Azerbaijani blogger & political activist (born c. 1991)

- Born: c. 1991
- Known for: political activism, 2011 imprisonment
- Political party: Azerbaijan Popular Front Party

Jabbar Savalan (Azerbaijani: Cabbar Savalan; born c. 1991) is an Azerbaijani blogger and political activist. On 4 May 2011, he was sentenced to two and half years in prison on charges of dealing drugs. The Azerbaijani government defended the ruling. However, the European Parliament and several human rights groups such as Amnesty International alleged the charges were fabricated and part of a pattern of framing government dissidents to silence them. He received a presidential pardon on 26 December 2011.

== Involvement in protests ==
A student at Sumgait State University, Savalan became active in the youth wing of the Azerbaijan Popular Front Party (APFP), the nation's primary opposition party to the continued rule of President Ilham Aliyev, son of the previous president Heydar Aliyev. With this group, he participated in an anti-government rally on 20 January; he also re-posted on Facebook an article from a Turkish newspaper that had criticized the president.

On 4 February 2011, he posted on Facebook calling for a "Day of Rage", that would emulate recent pro-democracy protests in Egypt and Syria. He urged citizens to join in protesting in Freedom Square in Baku, the nation's capital.

== Arrest and trial ==
The following day, 5 February, he was arrested returning from an APFP meeting in the city of Sumgayit. The police had allegedly searched his home in his absence. Savalan was taken to the police station, where he was searched. The police officer conducting the search then allegedly found 0.74 grams of marijuana in the pocket of his coat, and Savalan was booked on charges of "possessing narcotics with an intent to supply". Savalan then signed a confession which he later retracted, alleging that he had signed it only in the face of police pressure; his lawyer was not allowed to see him until two days after his arrest. On 7 February, a judge ordered him two months of pre-trial detention.

At Savalan's trial, he claimed the drugs were placed on him by police officers. A blood test showed that he had not recently used drugs, and his friends and family testified that he had no history of drug use. One friend reportedly told Amnesty International, "Jabbar is not a smoker and doesn't drink alcohol at all – there is no way he would be a drug user." However, he was convicted on the basis of his confession, and sentenced to two and a half years' imprisonment. He was twenty years old at the time of his sentencing.

Savalan's lawyer, Anar Gasimov, alleged that following the trial, one of the police officers had approached and threatened him, stating, "I know where you live. We will see what I will do for you." People protesting the verdict were reportedly violently dispersed by police forces.

Savalan's appeal to Azerbaijan's Supreme Court was rejected on 29 November 2011.

== International reaction ==
Amnesty International described the charges against Savalan as "trumped up", stating its belief that the accusation formed part of a pattern of "similar cases where drugs have been found on prominent critics of the government, such as Eynulla Fatullayev and Sakit Zahidov". The organization named him a prisoner of conscience. The organization selected Savalan's case for their 2011 Letter-Writing Marathon, which reportedly generated more than one million appeals on behalf of prisoners.

His arrest was also protested by the human rights organizations Index on Censorship, ARTICLE 19, and the Norwegian Helsinki Committee. Human Rights Watch described the government's actions as a "fresh example of the government's efforts to silence critical voices" and "blatant repression", urging that Savalan be released immediately.

On 12 May 2011, the European Parliament passed a resolution condemning Azerbaijani "human rights violations" and "oppression of opposition forces". The resolution mentioned concern for Savalan's case by name, noting that he had apparently been "targeted for using Facebook to call for demonstrations against the government" and that "serious doubts" existed regarding the fairness of his drug trial.

Savalan was freed from prison following a pardon by President Ilham Aliyev on 26 December 2011. Following his release, Savalan stated that "It feels good to be with my friends again. I feel good now that I can spend time with them and my family." Amnesty International issued a statement welcoming Savalan's release but calling for his conviction to also be overturned.

== Involvement in 2012 protests ==
On 6 March 2012, Savalan and three other youth activists were reportedly beaten by Baku police officers during a protest, prompting the Index on Censorship, ARTICLE 19, Reporters Without Borders, and the Committee to Protect Journalists to protest on their behalf in an advocacy letter. In early May, Savalan was conscripted into the army despite being exempt from military service, leading Amnesty International to state concern that he "was targeted for his peaceful activism".

== See also ==
- Bakhtiyar Hajiyev
- Human rights in Azerbaijan
