= Sumgait State University =

Public university in Azerbaijan

Coordinates: 40°34′28″N 49°40′37″E

Sumgayit State University
- Sumqayıt Dövlət Universiteti (SDU)
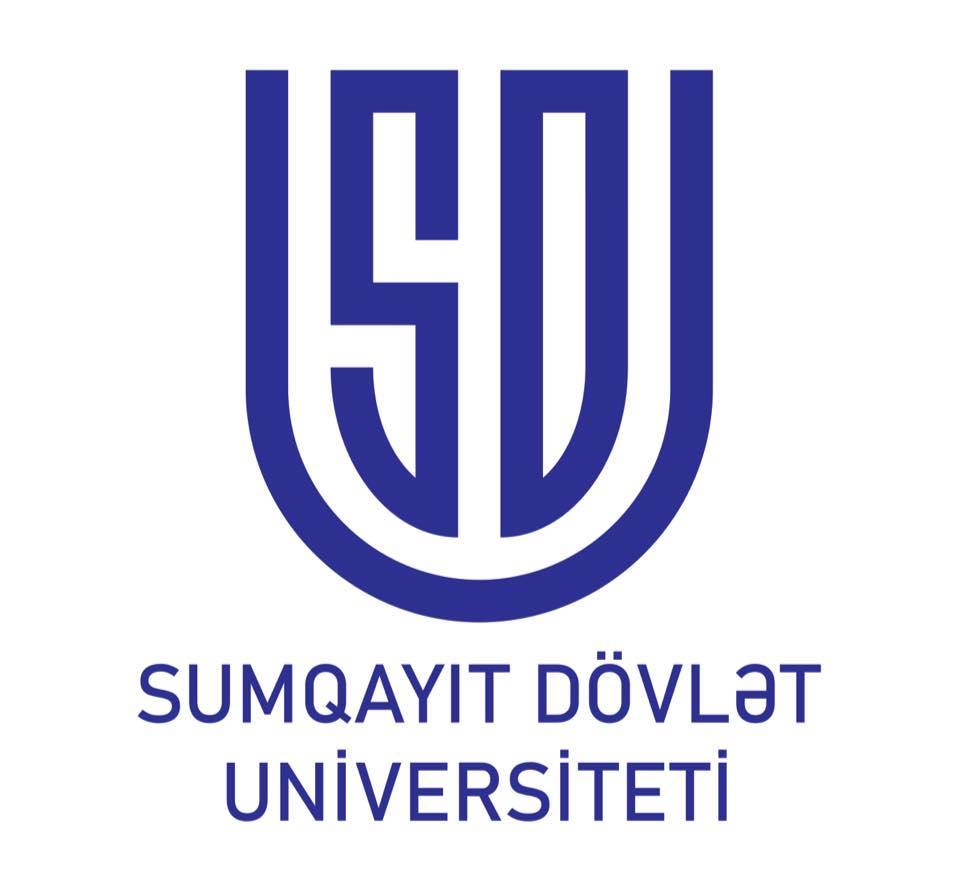
- Former names: Branch of Azerbaijan Oil and Chemical Institute (1962-1975); Higher Technical Education School (1975-1992); Azerbaijan Industrial Institute (1992-2000)
- Type: Public
- Established: 2000
- Rector: Nurali Yusifbayli
- Students: 8,000
- Location: Sumqayit, Azerbaijan
- Campus: Urban

Sumgait State University (Azerbaijani: Sumqayıt Dövlət Universiteti), sometimes written as Sumgayit State University, or Sumgait State University, is a public university in Sumgait, Azerbaijan.

== History ==
Sumgait State University (SSU) was established on the foundation of the Industrial Institute, based on the Decree "On the Improvement of the Education System in the Republic of Azerbaijan," signed by then president Heydar Aliyev on June 13, 2000. Its origins date back to 1962, when it was founded in Sumgait, a center of chemical industry in Azerbaijan, to address the demand for skilled engineering professionals. In 2000, the university expanded its academic scope to include multi-disciplinary training and placed increased emphasis on scientific research. The institution comprises six faculties: Economics and Management, Engineering, Natural Sciences, History and Geography, Mathematics, and Philology, alongside 18 departments. It offers bachelor's, master's, and doctoral programs. By a decision of the Cabinet of Ministers of Azerbaijan on February 3, 2016, and an order from the Ministry of Science and Education on March 4, 2016, Sumgait State Technical College was integrated into SSU and now operates under the university's administration. SSU collaborates with various organizations and institutions, including "SOCAR POLIMER," "Sumgait Technology Park" LLC, "AZERTECHNOLINE" LLC, and others, to support student career development and strengthen ties between education and industry.

== Campus ==
Sumgait State University (SSU) features three educational buildings and two dormitories. The first educational building comprises four floors and houses four faculties: Mathematics, Engineering, Economics and Management, and History and Geography. This building is equipped with auditoriums and laboratories that meet modern educational standards, a well-stocked library, and an information and computing center outfitted with contemporary technology. It also contains a publishing-polygraphy department, two assembly halls, a sports club, and a spacious canteen. The university's administration, including the rector and vice-rectors, along with various departments and centers, is located in this building.

The second educational building is dedicated to the Faculty of Natural Sciences. It features auditoriums and laboratories equipped with modern technology, along with a separate canteen for students.

The third educational building, located in Sumgait city's 16th block, serves the Faculty of Philology and the Department of Additional Education. It includes a library and a canteen, as well as the Sumgait Center established under the Azerbaijan Fencing Federation.

The outdoor areas surrounding all three educational buildings include facilities for recreational activities, such as mini football and basketball stadiums, a chess playground, and table tennis facilities, providing students with opportunities for leisure during their free time.

=== Dormitory ===
Sumgait State University (SSU) has two dormitories, which have been home to internally displaced persons (IDPs) since 1992. As part of the state's initiatives to enhance the living conditions for refugees and IDPs, a new settlement for IDPs was established in Sumgayit, facilitating the relocation of families from the university's Dormitory No. 1, which has undergone significant renovations due to its previous unusability.

Dormitory No. 1 is located on Aga Guliyev Street in the 44th block and consists of five floors, containing approximately 100 rooms. Each floor features two shower rooms, two kitchens, and two laundries. The first floor is equipped with a library, dining room, medical facilities, isolation room, and laundry area. Additionally, the dormitory includes a gym, a mini football field, and a volleyball court.

To ensure student comfort, the dormitory offers rooms that meet high standards, quality internet access, and heating. Plans are in place to equip living and common areas with necessary facilities, and Dormitory No. 1 is set to be operational from the 2022/2023 academic year.

== International rankings ==
The university has been recognized in international rankings, debuting in the QS European University Rankings in 2024/25 at 483rd place. It also ranked 1173rd in the 2023 UI GreenMetric World University Rankings. SSU is a member of the Association for the Advancement of Sustainability in Higher Education (AASHE), reflecting its focus on sustainable practices.

== Affiliations ==
The university is a member of the Caucasus University Association.
