= Elnur Majidli =

Azerbaijani activist and blogger

Elnur Majidli Azerbaijani: Elnur Məcidli
- Born: Baku, Azerbaijan SSR (now Azerbaijan)
- Known for: Internet activism

Elnur Majidli is an Azerbaijani democracy activist and blogger based in Paris, France. For his role in organizing the 2011 Azerbaijani protests, he was charged with attempting "violent overthrow" of the government. The charges were suspended in June 2011.

== Role in 2011 Azerbaijani protests ==
Starting in March 2011, Azerbaijan saw a series of mass protests for democratic reform inspired by the example of the Arab Spring. Though based in Strasbourg, Majidli helped to organize a Facebook page for a protest on March 11, calling it "the Great Peoples' Day". The date was chosen for being exactly one month after the fall of Egyptian president Hosni Mubarak. The groups administered by Majidli soon included tens of thousands of Azerbaijanis.

Shortly after the page's creation, the Azerbaijan General Prosecutor’s Office contacted Majidli by telephone, ordering him to end his activity or face criminal charges. Majidli refused, and on 1 April, Azerbaijan issued a warrant for his arrest on a charge of "violent overthrow of authority, or distributing materials calling for such". The government filed an Interpol request for Majidli's arrest, which the French government refused to grant. Authorities also brought Majidli's father and cousins to a police station for interrogation. Police were stationed outside the family home for two months, and Majidli's father and brother were fired from their jobs. Bakhtiyar Hajiyev, the only co-organizer of the site living within Azerbaijan, was arrested.

After reviewing Majidli's Facebook posts, Amnesty International protested on his behalf, describing the accusation of a call for violent overthrow as "baseless". The organization stated that he appeared to be "prosecuted simply for exercising his rights to freedom of expression and association", and urged Azerbaijan to drop the charges.

On 2 June, the charges against Majidli were suspended. Majidli's lawyers described the charges as a "moral terror", and Majidli announced his intention to continue fighting for the charges to be fully dropped, rather than suspended.

== Continued activism ==
By January 2012, Majidli's groups included more than 40,000 members. He helped to organize an anniversary protest on 11 March in which activists continued to call for democratic reform, endorsed by opposition leader Isa Gambar.
