= Trend News Agency =

Azerbaijani news company

Coordinates: 40°22′29.83″N 49°48′47.87″E

- Native name: Trend Xəbər Agentliyi
- Company type: Private
- Industry: News agency
- Founded: 1995; 31 years ago
- Headquarters: Baku, Azerbaijan
- Area served: Azerbaijan, Central Asia, Middle East, Europe, South East Asia
- Key people: Ilgar Huseynov (General Director)
- Products: News
- Number of employees: 150 (2008)
- Website: en.trend.az

Trend News Agency (Azerbaijani: Trend Xəbər Agentliyi) is an Azerbaijani news agency which focuses on current affairs in the Caucasus region and Central Asia. The agency is pro-government.

== History ==
Founded in 1995 as a private media outlet in Azerbaijan, Trend News Agency is a news provider in the Caucasus, Caspian region and the Central Asia. Ilgar Huseynov is the director general of the agency.

Trend News Agency produces news in five languages: Azerbaijani, English, Russian, Turkish and Persian. The services provide news of countries and regions by placing more focus on ongoing events in languages appropriate to the specific audiences.

Analytical reports and feature articles highlight major political, economic, energy developments and financial articles from the South Caucasus, Iran, Turkey, and Central Asia.

Trend's specialized bulletins cover areas covering such sectors as politics, business, oil and gas, transport and logistics, finance and banking in Azerbaijan, Iran, Uzbekistan, Tajikistan, Turkmenistan, Kyrgyzstan, and Kazakhstan.

Trend founded in August 2015 the Baku International Policy and Security Network (BIPSN), a non-governmental think tank. Baku Network operates an expert network, including representatives of Azerbaijani and foreign academia and diplomatic circles, international politics and security experts.

Trend is a member of the Organization of Asia-Pacific News Agencies (OANA), World Association of Newspapers (WAN-IFRA), and News Agency World Congress (NAWC).
