= Movsum Samadov =

Azerbaijani political figure (born 1966)

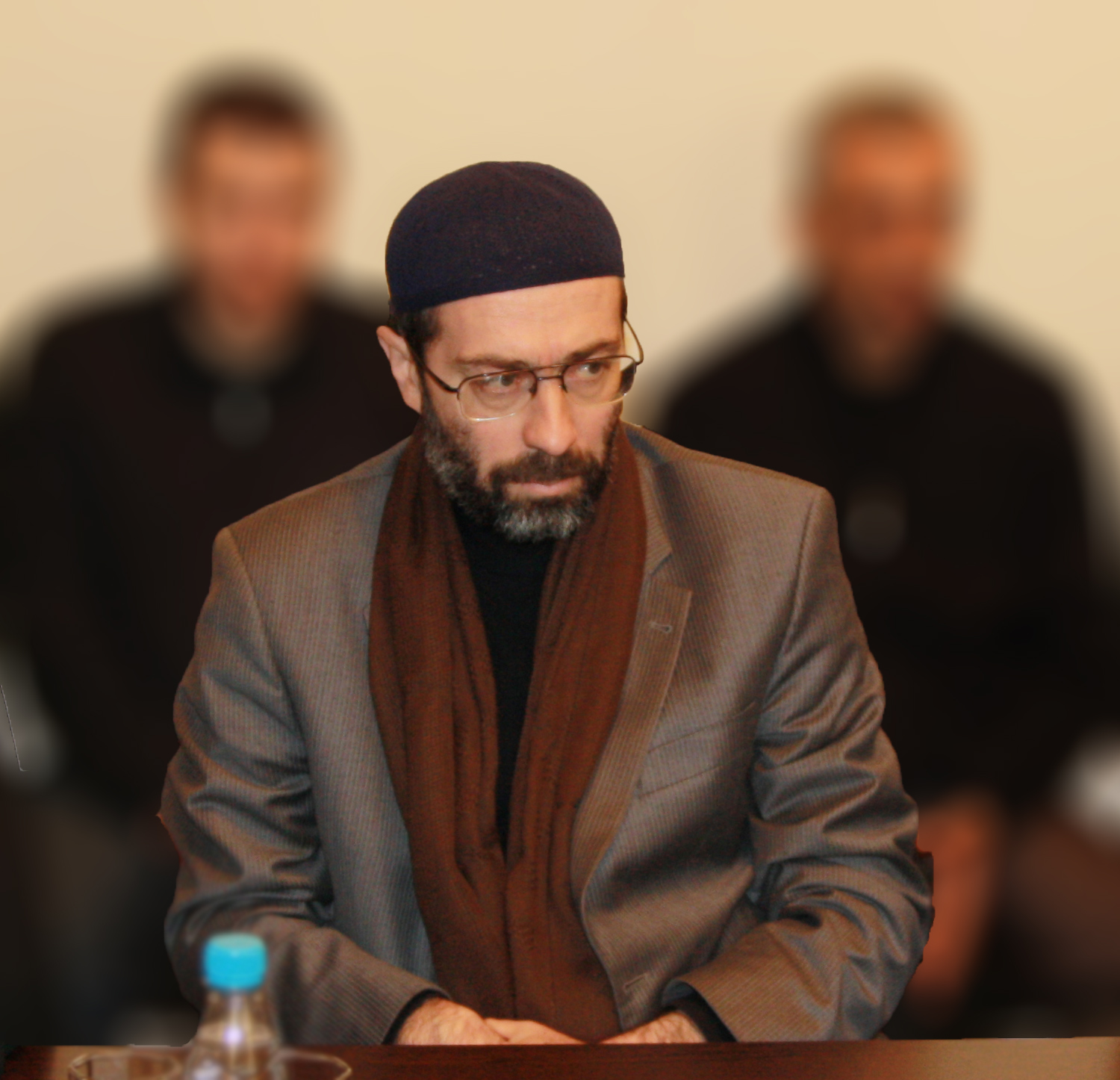

Personal details
- Born: September 4, 1966 (age 60) Quba, Azerbaijani SSR, Soviet Union
- Party: Islamic Party of Azerbaijan
- Spouse: Mehparə Səmədova
- Children: 4
- Parent: Mərdan Səmədov (father)
- Education: Azerbaijan Medical University; Qom Seminary
- Occupation: Politician, Theologian

Movsum Mardan oghlu Samadov (Note: Azerbaijani: Mövsüm Mərdan oğlu Səmədov) (born 4 September 1966) is an Azerbaijani political figure who has been serving as the 3rd chairman of the Azerbaijan Islamic Party, a Shia Islamist organization, since 2007.

== Personal life ==
Movsum Samadov was born on September 4, 1965, in the Guba district to Mardan and Mehbara Samadov.

In 1972-1982, he completed his secondary education at Guba City Secondary School No. 3, and in 1983-1989, he received higher medical education at the Department of Treatment and Prevention of the Nariman Narimanov Azerbaijan Medical Institute (now Azerbaijan Medical University). In 1989-1990, he completed an internship and received the "therapist" qualification.

In 1990-1992, he completed full-term active military service. He was discharged from the ranks of the Armed Forces with the military rank of "medical service lieutenant". Currently, he is a reserve medical service lieutenant in the Azerbaijan Armed Forces.

After military service, he worked as a doctor in the Republic of Dagestan in Russia, which has a significant Azerbaijani population, and then as a chief doctor in the Digah village of the Guba district for 2 years.

From in 1995 he enrolled in a religious education course at the Qom Scientific Center located in the city of Qom, Iran, and finished in 2002.

He is married to Mehpara Samadova. They have 4 children in total.

His wife, Mehpara Samadova, participated in the international conference on "Islamic Awakening and Women" held on July 11, 2012, under the chairmanship of Iran's Supreme Leader Ali Khamenei and read a poem dedicated to Khamenei that was written by their daughter, Zahra Samadova, in Persian.

== Political career ==
Movsum Samadov was a participant in the Azerbaijan National Liberation Movement that took place in Azerbaijan in the late 1980s and early 1990s. In 1990, he became a member of the People's Front of Azerbaijan and thus started his political activity. In 1993, he resigned from the Azerbaijan People's Front and joined the Azerbaijan Islamic Party. After completing his studies at the Qom Seminary, in February 2002, he returned to Azerbaijan and began to participate in the management of the Azerbaijan Islamic Party. In 2002-2007, he was elected chairman of the Guba branch of the Islamic Party of Azerbaijan, and in 2007, he was elected as the chairman of the whole party.

=== Arrest ===
On January 2, 2011, at the meeting of the General Assembly of the Islamic Party of Azerbaijan, Movsum Samadov criticized the government about their abuses of human rights, their corruption and bribery, their methods of solving the Karabakh conflict, their pressure on Islam and Islamists, and the hijab ban. 5 days after this incident: On January 7, 2011, while returning home from work, he was detained for allegedly violating traffic rules and was found guilty of disobeying the police and sentenced to 13 days of administrative detention. The 13-day prison sentence ended on January 20, 2011, during which he was detained at the Main Organized Crime Department of the Ministry of Internal Affairs.

On January 24, 2011, a meeting of the General Assembly of the Islamic Party of Azerbaijan was held, and according to the party charter, the chairmanship of Movsum Samadov, who was in prison, was given temporarily to his first deputy, Elchin Manafov.

By the decision of the Baku Court of Serious Crimes dated October 7, 2011, M. Samadov was sentenced to 12 years in prison according to the provisions for which he was accused.

M. Samadov was sent to Baku City Penitentiary No. 11 after the court verdict. It has been "kars" several times here. On September 18, 2014, he was sent to Baku City Penitentiary No. 12 without any reason. On October 9, 2014, the Garadagh District Court issued a decision to transfer M. Samadov to Gobustan closed prison for a period of 2 years, based on the claim of the head of prison No. 11 of Baku city. An appeal was filed against the decision of the Garadagh court by his lawyer A. Gasimli. Based on the appeal, the court held on November 24, 2014, upheld that decision.

On December 12, 2019, the European Court of Human Rights announced its decision regarding Movsum Samadov's complaint to them. In the decision, the violation of M. Samadov's rights was recognized and Azerbaijan was ordered to pay him 4,000 euros in compensation. According to the court's decision, the arrest of M. Samadov was accompanied by the violation of some rights guaranteed by the European Convention on Human Rights. They were Articles 5.3 (unlawfulness of detention) and 6.1 (failure to ensure a fair trial) of that Convention.

== In popular culture ==
In 2013, Javid Jabbarli's book "Allah amaninda" about Movsum Samadov was published, the presentation ceremony of the book took place on May 23, 2013, in Baku.

Nariman Mahmud published his book "Before the Divine Trial" about Movsum Samadov. The book contains the literary-journalistic narrative of N. Mahmud and the interviews given by M. Samadov to the press. The book was published in Baku in 2014.

A documentary-biographical narrative "Season of Mortals" was written about him, compiled and edited by Arzu Eyvazov.
