= Aşağı Öysüzlü =

- Municipality
- Location within Azerbaijan
- Coordinates: 40°58′01″N 45°35′23″E
- Country: Azerbaijan
- Rayon: Tovuz

Population
  - Total: 6,398
- Time zone: UTC+4 (AZT)
  - Summer (DST): UTC+5 (AZT)

Aşağı Öysüzlü (also, Aşağı Öksüzlü and Ashagy Oksyuzlyu) is a village and municipality in the Tovuz Rayon of Azerbaijan. It has a population of 6,398.
