= Nurali Yusifbayli =

Rector of Sumgait State University (since 2026)

Nurali Yusifbayli Yusifbayli Nurali Adil
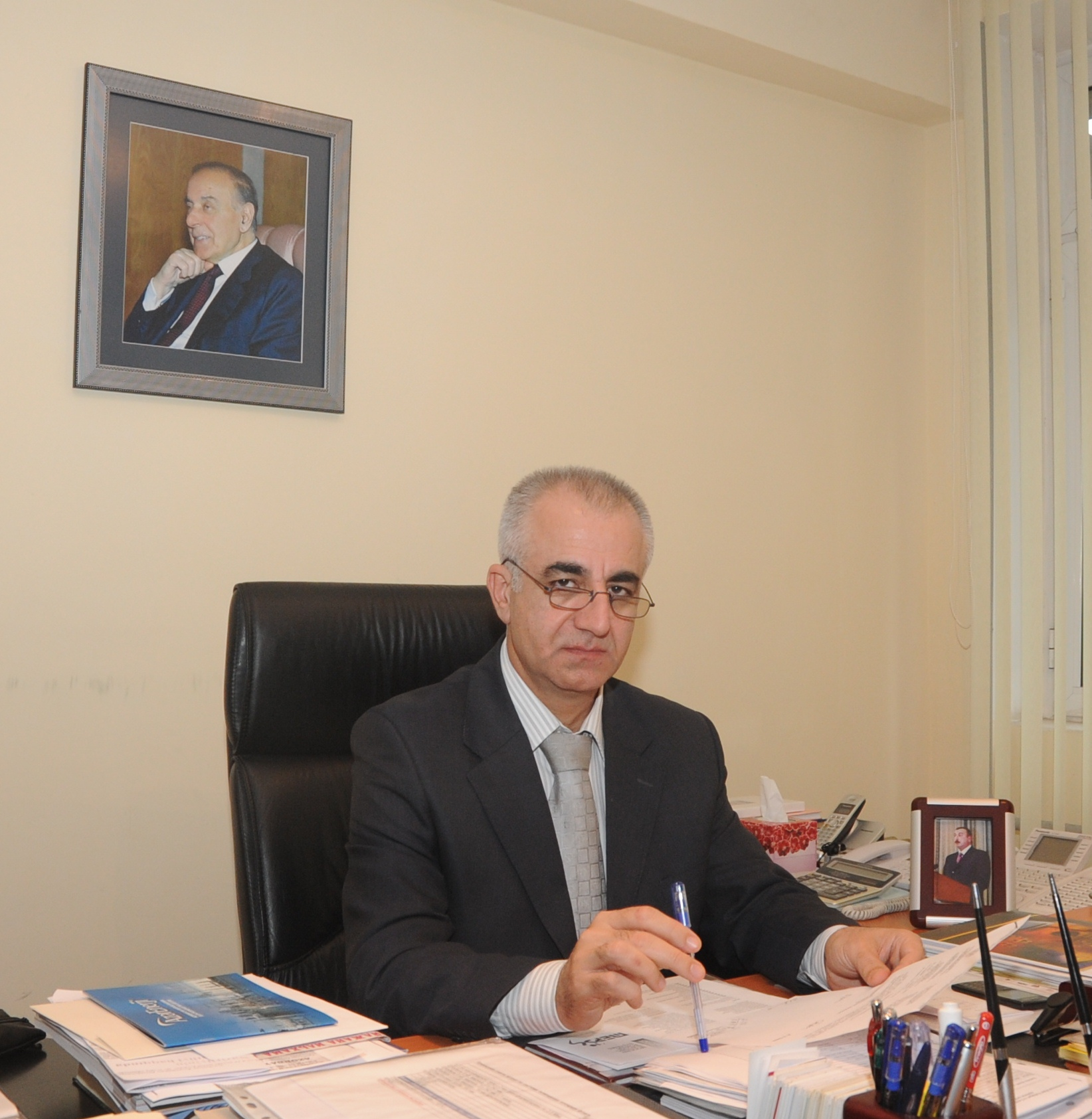

Rector of the Sumgayit State University
- Incumbent
- Assumed office May 5, 2026

Vice-Rector for Academic Affairs of the Azerbaijan Technical University
- In office January 18, 2021 – May 5, 2026

Deputy Chairman of The State Agency on Alternative and Renewable Energy Sources
- In office March 13, 2015 – September 22, 2020

Chief of Strategic Planning Department of the Ministry of Economy and Industry of the Republic of Azerbaijan
- In office 2014–2015

Head Advisor of the Ministry of Economy and Industry of the Republic of Azerbaijan, Counselor of the Minister
- In office 2012–2014

Director of "Azerenergy" JSC "Azerbaijan Scientific-Research and Design Institute of Power Engineering"
- In office 2009–2012

Personal details
- Born: March 28, 1963 (age 63) Azerbaijan Republic
- Party: New Azerbaijan Party
- Education: Kyiv Polytechnic Institute
- Website: https://sdu.edu.az/az/

Yusifbayli Nurali Adil Vice-Rector for Academic Affairs of the Azerbaijan Technical University

== Early life ==
Yusifbayli Nurali Adil was born on 28 March 1963 in Azerbaijan Republic. In 1980 he joined the Electroenergetics faculty of Kiev Polytechnic Institute (currently Kiev Technical Academy) and graduated in 1986 from that university's "Electric Systems Cybernetics" specialty. From 1986 to 1989 he worked as an electrical engineer in Thermal Power Plant No.1 in Sumgait, heading the electrical department and power plant; from 1989 to 1993 he worked as head dispatcher at "Azerenergy" JSC. He continued his activities as a chief, head dispatcher, deputy of chief engineer at "Azerenergy" JSC from 1993 to 2001. In 2001–02 he worked as deputy of Head director of "Azerenergy" JSC "Energy transmission" Production Association. In 2002–09 worked as a chief of Central Dispatch Department. In 2009–12 worked as a director of "Azerenergy" JSC " Azerbaijan Scientific-Research and Design Institute of Power Engineering". Within this time was chief of dissertation council on "05.14.02 - Electric power plant and electroenergy systems" EAC specialty under the President of the Republic of Azerbaijan.

He was appointed as the Rector of Sumgayit State University by the Decree of the President of the Republic of Azerbaijan dated May 5, 2026.

Since 2012 was head advisor of the Ministry of Economy and Industry of the Republic of Azerbaijan, Counselor of the Minister since 2014 was chief of Strategic Planning Department of the Ministry of Economy and Industry of the Republic of Azerbaijan.

By decree of the president of the Republic of Azerbaijan from 13 March 2015 to 22 September 2020 was appointed deputy chairman of The State Agency on Alternative and Renewable Energy Sources.

By the order of the Minister of Education of the Republic of Azerbaijan No. K-44, he was appointed Vice-Rector for Academic Affairs of the Azerbaijan Technical University from January 18, 2021 to May 05, 2026.

By decree of CIS Member countries of the president of Electroenergetics Council, dated 20 October 2004, he was given the honorary title "CIS Honored power engineer".

By decree of the president of the Republic of Azerbaijan, dated 19 October 2005, he was given the honorary title -"honored engineer” of the Republic of Azerbaijan.

He was awarded "Golden Buta" prize for the activity of the electric power system and the development and improvement of the application of scientific and project issues in 2011.

By decree of the president of the Republic of Azerbaijan, dated 21 October 2014, he was given the honorary title "honored scientist".

He received his degrees of Candidate of Technical Sciences in 1995 and Doctor of Technical Sciences in Azerbaijan Scientific-Research and Design-Prospecting Power Engineering Institute in 2004.

Doctor of Technical Sciences, professor, author of eight books, three Azerbaijan Standard and more than 170 scientific works. Chief editor of International Scientific - production "ELECTRO-energetics-technics-mechanics+control" journal. Member of Institute of Electrical and Electronics Engineers (IEEE), and editorial staff “Power engineering” and "Applied Mathematics" journals and other scientific councils of research institutions. Since 1998, engaged in pedagogical activity, worked as a professor of "Control and Automation" at AzTU. His research interests include reliability and security of power systems, development of national and interstate power grids, SCADA, Smart Grid technology, energy efficiency and safety, renewable energy.

Yusifbayli Nurali Adil is married and has two children.

== Presentations ==
- ON INTELLECTUALISATION OF OPERATIONAL AND EMERGENCY AUTOMATION CONTROL OF “POWER BRIDGE AGT”
- INTELLECTUAL VOLTAGE MANAGEMENT IN ELECTRICAL NETWORKS

== Awards ==
- 20.10.2004 - "Honored power engineer" of CIS.
- 19.10.2005 - “Honored Engineer”.
- 02.06.2011 - “Qızıl Buta”.
- 21.10.2014 - “Honored Scientist”.
- 10.04.2023 - “Advanced Education Worker of the Republic of Azerbaijan”.

== Books ==
- Enerji Menecmenti Sistemi
- Elektroenergetika sistemlərinin yeni fəaliyyəti və inkişafı şəraitində dispetçer idarəçiliyi məsələlərinin əsasları
- Rusca-Azərbaycanca-İngiliscə Elektroenergetika terminləri lüğəti
- Mенеджмент Энергосбережения
- Elektrik sistemlərində keçid prosesləri 2008
- Elektrik sistemlərinin avtomatikası
- Elektrik sistemlərində keçid prosesləri 2022
- Enerji: Keçmiş Və Gələcək Vektorların Kəsişməsində
