= Elmar Huseynov =

Azerbaijani journalist (1967–2005)

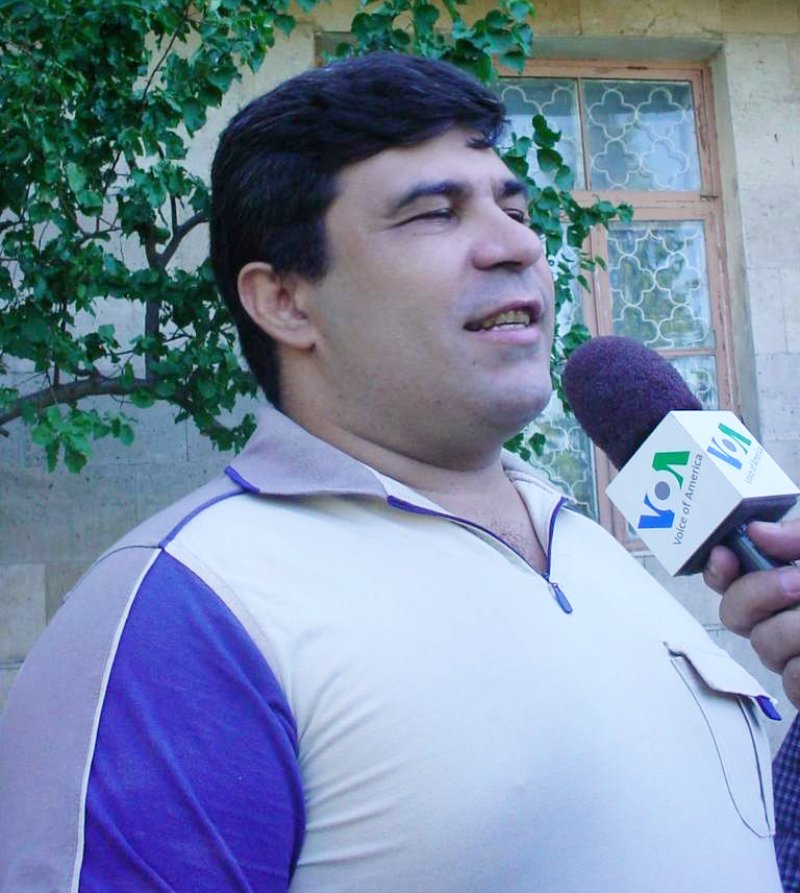
- Born: July 17, 1967; Baku, Azerbaijan SSR, Soviet Union
- Died: March 2, 2005 (aged 37); Baku, Azerbaijan
- Education: Azerbaijan Architecture and Construction University
- Occupations: Journalist, author

Elmar Sabir oglu Huseynov (Azerbaijani: Elmar Sabir oğlu Hüseynov; 17 July 1967 – 2 March 2005) was an independent Azerbaijani journalist, widely known for his criticism of Azerbaijani authorities, especially incumbent president Ilham Aliyev and his father and predecessor Heydar Aliyev.

He was murdered in March 2005, and it is believed that his murder was ordered by government officials.

== Life ==
Elmar Huseynov was born in 1967 in Baku and educated as an engineer at the Azerbaijan University of Architecture and Construction.

He began his journalistic career in the 1990s, first writing in a Russian daily newspaper in Azerbaijan titled Zerkalo and then as the editor-in-chief of a weekly called Alver. In 1996, he created a press agency called Trend and Monitor. In 1998 he was convicted for "insulting the nation" and being unable to pay the fine, was forced to close the Monitor. In August 1998, he opened the Baku boulevard. In November 1999, he also published the weekly Baku news, which was closed after eight editions. In February 2000, he became the editor of the Weekly monitor. The Baku boulevard was closed on September 4 by court order. Huseynov received many awards for his journalism. During his career, he received many threats and was subjected to harassment by authorities ranging up to incarceration.

He was murdered in Baku on 2 March 2005.

== See also ==
- Khadija Ismayilova
- Eynulla Fatullayev
- List of journalists killed in Europe
