= Yuxarı Öysüzlü =

- Municipality
- Location within Azerbaijan
- Coordinates: 40°56′56″N 45°32′49″E
- Country: Azerbaijan
- Rayon: Tovuz

Population
  - Total: 6,375
- Time zone: UTC+4 (AZT)
  - Summer (DST): UTC+5 (AZT)

Yuxarı Öysüzlü (also, Yuxarı Öksüzlü, Yukary-Oysyuzlyu, Yukhary Oysyuzlyu, and Yukhary-Oksyuzlyu) is a village and municipality in the Tovuz Rayon of Azerbaijan. It has a population of 5,763.
