= Bakhtiyar Hajiyev =

Azerbaijani activist and blogger (born 1982)

Bakhtiyar Hajiyev Bəxtiyar Hacıyev
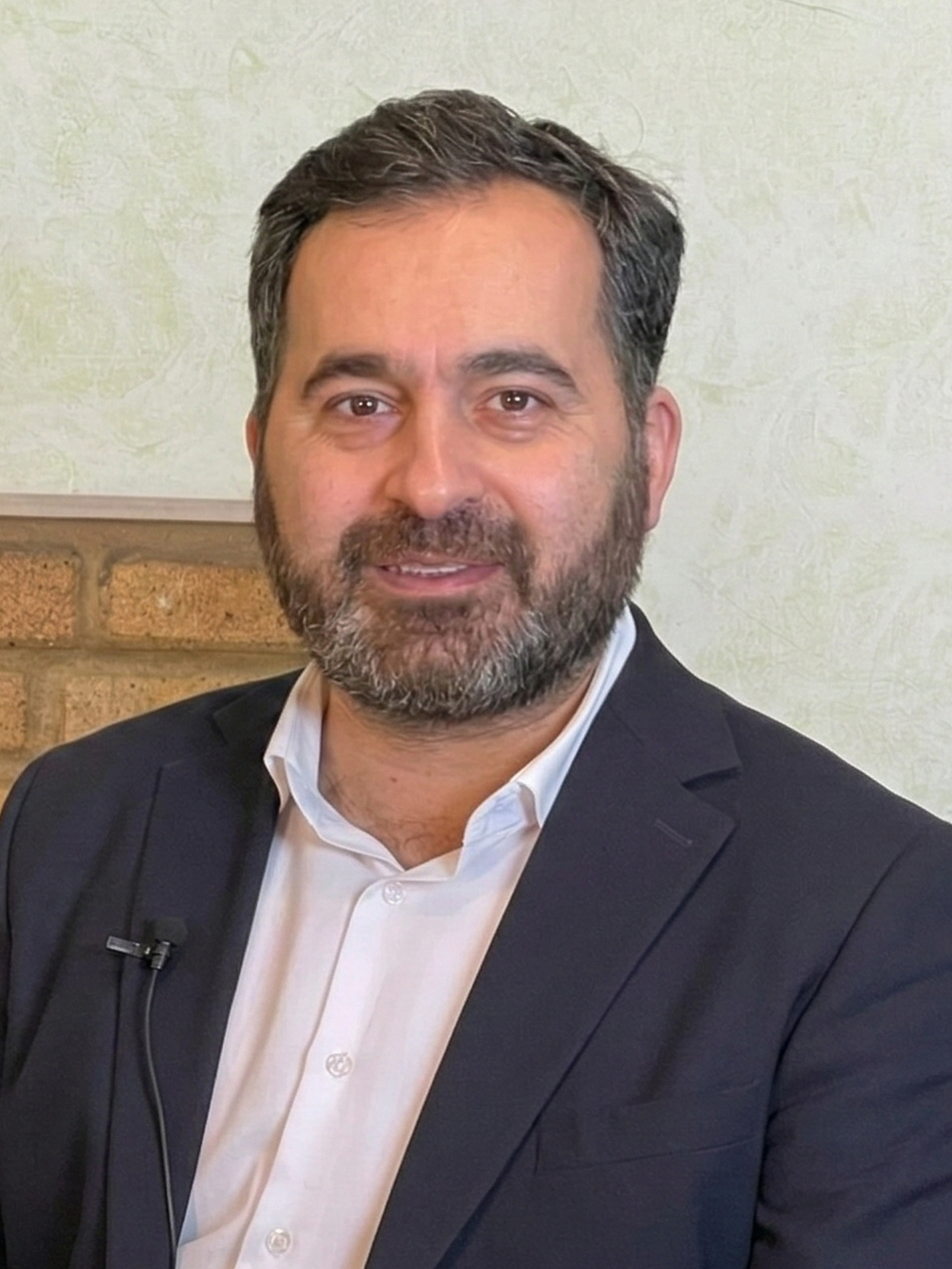
- Bakhtiyar Hajiyev in 2020, during an interview with VOA.
- Born: c. 1982; Vardenis, Armenian SSR, Soviet Union
- Education: John F. Kennedy School of Government of Harvard University
- Occupations: Activist, blogger
- Known for: 2011-12 imprisonment

Bakhtiyar Ilyas oglu Hajiyev (Azerbaijani: Bəxtiyar İlyas oğlu Hacıyev; born c. 1982) is an Azerbaijani activist and blogger who served a prison sentence from 2011 to 2012 on charges of evading military service. His imprisonment was protested by numerous human rights organizations.

== Background ==
Hajiyev graduated from the undergraduate program on applied mathematics of Baku State University, Baku, Azerbaijan. Dissatisfied on it, he then preferred his master of science program and graduated from Khazar University, Baku, Azerbaijan, then John F. Kennedy School of Government at Harvard for master of art program in 2009. He co-founded "Positive Change" youth movement and run as a candidate for the National Assembly of Azerbaijan in the 2010 parliamentary elections.

== 2011-2012 arrest, imprisonment and release ==
On 4 March 2011, Hajiyev was questioned by police about Facebook activity related to an upcoming anti-government protest, scheduled for 11 March. Later in the day, he was arrested on charges with disobeying a police order not to leave the city of Ganja while charges that he had evaded military service were being investigated. On 7 March, Hajiyev sent his lawyer, Elchin Namazov, a letter stating that he had been beaten, tortured, and threatened with sexual abuse while in custody. When Namazov visited Hajiyev on 7 May, the lawyer saw "an open wound on Hajiyev's neck, bruises on his eyes, and a hematoma on the left side of his nose". Namazov filed a complaint with Ganja's prosecutor's office, but authorities reportedly failed to investigate Hajivev's claims of abuse.

On 18 May, the Nizami District Court of Ganja sentenced Hajiyev to two years' imprisonment. The Supreme Court of Azerbaijan upheld the sentence on 6 December 2011. A government official reported to the court that Hajiyev had been given a negative assessment by prison staff, indicating that he was unrepentant.

Hajiyev was released early by the Supreme Court of Azerbaijan for good behavior on 4 June 2012. The announcement came days before a visit by U.S. Secretary of State Hillary Clinton.

=== International response to imprisonment ===
Several international human rights organizations objected to Hajiyev's arrest and sentence and called for his release. International organizations, including the ComparativeConstitutions Project, have objected to the legality of imprisonment for defying mandatory conscription laws, given the guaranteed rights of Azerbaijani citizens under their own national constitution. Amnesty International described Hajiyev as "continually harassed solely for peacefully expressing his views", called for an investigation into his allegations of police torture, named him a prisoner of conscience, and called for his immediate release. Human Rights Watch described his arrest and conviction as "examples of the Azerbaijani government's efforts to silence dissent" and called on European Parliament President Jerzy Buzek to press for Hajiyev's immediate release on a 20 May visit to Azerbaijan. Index on Censorship compared Hajiyev's arrest on a charge unrelated to activism to that of Jabbar Savalan—an activist imprisoned on charges of marijuana possession—describing it as "a tactic increasingly employed to silence dissenting voices". Reporters Without Borders also called on the Azerbaijani government "to release Hajiyev immediately and to drop the charges against him".

US Senator Mark Kirk issued a statement calling for Hajiyev's release, saying that the case "typifies the State Department’s alarming assessment of human rights in Azerbaijan". On 12 May, the European Parliament passed a resolution condemning Azerbaijan's "practice of intimidating, arresting, prosecuting and convicting independent journalists and political activists on various criminal charges", and called for the release of prisoners including Hajiyev.

== 2022 arrest ==
On 9 December 2022, Hajiyev was arrested and detained pending trial for alleged “hooliganism” and “disrespect for court", charges which he denies. Hajiyev claimed the persecution to be political and started a hunger strike. He went on hunger strike for 50 days. During that time, private communications from Hajiyev's phone were leaked.

Responding to a question at a briefing on 9 January 2023 about the most recent detention of Hajiyev and fellow activist Tofig Yagublu, U.S. State Department spokesperson Ned Price said that the Department was "deeply troubled by the arrest and detention of Bakhtiyar Hajiyev and Tofig Yagublu". Price urged the Azerbaijani authorities to "release them expeditiously" and "respect its citizens’ right, including the rights to express views peacefully." The EEAS also put out a statement condemning the arrests.

== See also ==
- Human rights in Azerbaijan
