= Azerbaijan Islamic Party =

Azerbaijan Islamic Party Azərbaycan İslam Partiyası
- Leader: Movsum Samadov
- Founder: Alikram Aliyev
- Founded: 1991
- Banned: 1995
- Newspaper: Yeni Nabz ("New Pulse")
- Ideology: Shia Islamism; Azerbaijani nationalism
- Religion: Shia Islam

The Azerbaijan Islamic Party (Azerbaijani: Azərbaycan İslam Partiyası; AİP) is a banned Shia Islamist organization in Azerbaijan. The political party was founded in 1991 in the town of Nardaran, which lies northeast of the capital Baku on the Absheron Peninsula. Nardaran is a stronghold of conservative Shia Islam in predominantly secular Azerbaijan. The party was officially registered in 1992. Its registration, however, was cancelled in 1995, and has not been reinstated since.

== Views ==
It advocated stronger ties with Iran and even proclaiming the state of Azerbaijan into an Islamic Republic as it rejected the ideas of pan-Turkism, regarding them as dangerous and utopian. Nevertheless, it was also an Azerbaijani nationalist party and was known for its fiery nationalist and anti-Armenian rhetoric and frequently advocated a military solution to the Nagorno-Karabakh conflict which was partly under Armenian occupation. It was fiercely opposed and advocated a ban of proselytism and Christian missionary activities.

The party was also anti-US, anti-Zionist and anti-EU and supported Hezbollah and its leader Hassan Nasrallah. The leader of the party was Movsum Samadov.

== Ban ==
In 1995, the government of Azerbaijan accused the Islamic Party of Azerbaijan of being covertly financed by Iran, which Azerbaijan regarded as an interference in its domestic affairs, and which is illegal under Azerbaijani law. Therefore, the leaders of the party were arrested and the Islamic Party of Azerbaijan was officially banned. Subsequently, under the updated secular laws of Azerbaijan, Islamist parties and the formation of Islamist parties were banned.

On 7 October 2011, Samadov was sentenced to 12 years in prison on charges of attempts to set up a criminal group to plan terror attacks and to overthrow the government.

== See also ==
- Islamic Resistance Movement of Azerbaijan
- List of Islamic political parties
- Islam in Azerbaijan
- Religion in Azerbaijan
