= Eynulla Fatullayev =

Azerbaijani journalist

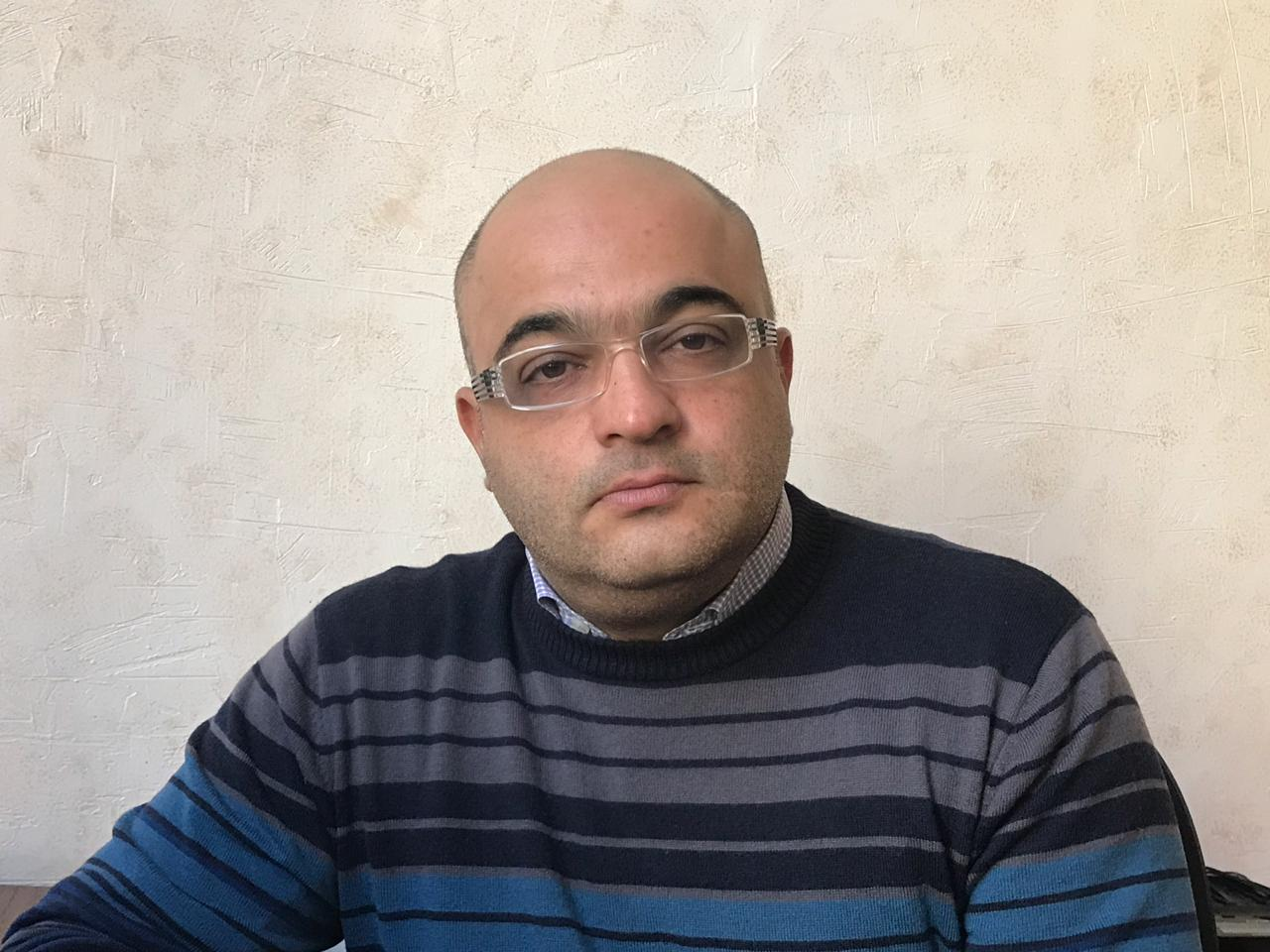
- Born: September 25, 1976 (age 50); Baku, Azerbaijan SSR, Soviet Union
- Occupation: journalist
- Known for: dissident reporting, 2007-11 imprisonment
- Awards: International Press Freedom Award (2009); UNESCO/Guillermo Cano World Press Freedom Prize (2012)

Eynulla Emin oglu Fatullayev (Azerbaijani: Eynulla Emin oğlu Fətullayev; born 25 September 1976) is an Azerbaijani journalist and the founder and editor-in-chief of the news website Haqqin.az. He was the editor-in-chief of the independent Russian-language weekly Realny Azerbaijan and Azerbaijani-language daily Gündəlik Azərbaycan newspapers. He was imprisoned for four years in Azerbaijan for his criticism of government's policies and for his comments on the Khojaly massacre. His sentence was condemned by Reporters Without Borders, International PEN, and the Committee to Protect Journalists, and Amnesty International named him a prisoner of conscience and 2011 "priority case."

== Career ==
Eynulla Fatullayev served as the editor of the Realny Azerbaijan (Russian for Real Azerbaijan) and Gündəlik Azərbaycan (Azerbaijani for Azerbaijan Daily). His editorship was notable for its criticism of the Azerbaijani government and its policies. In both publications, he criticized the government for its violations of press freedom and human rights. He has also been criticised for his article about the 2003 Azerbaijani elections which were accused of being fraudulent.

== Government pressure ==
=== Persecution ===
Threats, intimidation and violence have been used against Eynulla Fatullayev to influence his journalism, including death threats, beatings, legal prosecution, and the kidnapping of family members in Azerbaijan. On 26 July 2004, he was severely beaten with blows to the head on a street in Baku for his articles critical of the government. Eynulla Fatullayev was also called to face a fine of 25,000 Euros and to be jailed for "insulting the name and dignity" of a deputy in the ruling party, Siyavush Novruzov.

In early August 2006, Minister Usubov filed three criminal defamation suits against Fatullayev in response to articles titled “The revenge of the antibiotic,” “The failure of the antibiotic,” and “The antibiotic and journalists,” published in July and August, which alleged ties between the Interior Ministry official Ramil Usubov and Haji Mammadov, a former Interior Ministry official who was on trial for murder and kidnapping. On 26 September 2006, Judge Malakhat Abdulmanafova of the Yasamal District Court in Baku convicted Fatullayev of criminal libel and insult and sentenced him to a conditional two-year prison term, ordered him to publish a retraction, and pay a fine of US$11,300 in moral damages to Usubov. Fatullayev suspects this was in retaliation to his critical publications against the Interior Ministry.

On 1 October 2006, Fatullayev was forced to suspend publication of both papers after his father was kidnapped. The kidnappers threatened to kill Fatullayev, as well as his father, if Fatullayev continued to publish the papers. The kidnapping had been preceded by numerous phone threats against Fatullayev and his family. Fatullayev told Human Rights Watch:

Starting on September 27, I personally, my family, and the paper’s commercial director got frequent phone calls warning us to stop writing critical articles against the Interior Minister Ramil Usubov, or they were going to kill me like Elmar Husseinov [investigative journalist, murdered on 2 March 2005]... They called my mother and threatened to murder the entire family if I did not stop writing.... On September 31, several unidentified, armed people kidnapped my father, blindfolded him, and took him to some kind of a country house. I received a phone call demanding that I stop publication of my newspapers or I would loose (sic) my father... The next morning I announced the closure of the papers. Only then my father was released.

=== The Karabakh Diary and statements on Khojaly Massacre ===
On 6 March 2007, Nizami Bahmanov, head of Azerbaijani community of Karabakh, complained that Eynulla Fatullayev had, in an interview published on a website, given "false information" that the Khojaly massacre had been committed by the Azerbaijani army and not by Armenians. Fatullayev said he did not hold an interview with the website and called it propaganda against him. On 1 March 2007, 70-80 people had held a protest outside the editorial office of Fatullayev and raised posters that accused him of being a Dashnak (Armenian) agent and calling for Fatullayev to be stripped of his citizenship. After the reading the resolution, the participants threw eggs at the editorial office, breaking two windows. The police suppressed the protest. On May 31, the Azerbaijani Union of War Veterans expressed its disapproval against Fatullayev's article about the Khojaly massacre.

Fatullayev was charged with slandering the army and sentenced to two and a half years' imprisonment, a term he served in Baku. Amnesty International described the case as "trumped up charges after being critical of the government."

However, in his statement to the European Court of Human Rights Fatullayev noted that in the article "The Karabakh Diary", he had merely conveyed the statements of a local Armenian, who had told Fatullayev his version of the events during the interview. Fatullayev claimed that his article did not directly accuse any Azerbaijani national of committing any crime and that in his article, there was no statement asserting that any of the Khojaly victims had been killed or mutilated by Azerbaijani fighters.

The European Court of Human Rights ruled that "although "The Karabakh Diary" might have contained certain exaggerated or provocative assertions, the author did not cross the limits of journalistic freedom". The Court also noted that "The Karabakh Diary" did not constitute a piece of investigative journalism focusing specifically on the Khojaly events and considered that Fatullayev's statements about these events were made rather in passing, parallel to the main theme of the article.

In 2011, after being released from prison, Eynulla Fatullayev defended his 2005 comments which held Azerbaijani fighters and not Armenians responsible for the 1992 killings in Khojaly and added that the Azerbaijani government has long sought to use the Khojaly events to persecute its opponents, like the first president of Azerbaijan, Ayaz Mutalibov, who is still under criminal investigation for complicity in the Khojaly events. He also mentions Fahmin Hajiyev, the head of Azerbaijan's interior troops of the country, who spent 11 years in prison because of the Khojaly events.

Yet in February 2014 in a televised interview to ANS TV Fatullayev said that the Armenians perpetrated a genocide in Khojaly, and that he never questioned that, even in his "Karabakh Diary". He also mentioned that he personally joined a "Justice for Khojaly" rally in Strasbourg.

== Imprisonment ==
While in prison for defamation, additional charges were brought against Fatullayev. In a report about a possible U.S. military strike against Iran, Fatullayev included a list of targets within Azerbaijan, which brought an additional charge of encouraging terrorism. Upon conviction in 2007, he was sentenced to eight and a half years.

On 30 December 2009, prison officials alleged that they found 0.22 grams of heroin in Fatullayev's cell, a crime for which he was later sentenced to an additional two and a half years' imprisonment. Amnesty International again described the charges as "fabricated."

The European Court of Human Rights has ordered Azerbaijan to release Fatullayev and to pay him EUR 25,000 in "moral damages".

Fatullayev was granted a pardon on 26 May 2011.

=== International attention ===
In 2009, Fatullayev was awarded an CPJ International Press Freedom Award for "defending press freedom in the face of attacks, threats or imprisonment."

On 24 May 2011, U.K. journalists including Jon Snow of Channel 4 News and John Mulholland, editor of The Observer, joined Amnesty International in issuing a "mass tweet" on Fatullayev's behalf; the journalists photographed themselves with placards reading "Eynulla Fatullayevi azad et!"—meaning "Free Eynulla Fatullayev!" in Azerbaijani—and tweeted the photographs to President Ilham Aliyev. Fatullayev received a full pardon two days later, and he was released after serving four years of his eight-year sentence. He attributed his release to the work of Amnesty International activists, saying, "In my opinion, you saved me. Thank you to all those who tweeted."

Almost one year after his release, UNESCO awarded Fatullayev with its 2012 UNESCO/Guillermo Cano World Press Freedom Prize, which Fatullayev would accept on World Press Freedom Day in Tunis.

==== End of relationship with Amnesty International ====
Amnesty International ended its cooperation with Fatullayev, issuing a statement on 23 January 2013, saying Fatullayev had "misled the organization about the source of funding for a project he had requested Amnesty International involvement in". Amnesty International also expressed its belief and concern on that Fatullayev and his site Haqqin.az, is used by the Government of Azerbaijan to discredit European criticism of human rights violations in Azerbaijan.

In December 2012, Fatullayev had initiated a research project on human rights abuses in Germany, to which he invited human rights experts, including a spokesperson from Amnesty International, who declined the invitation. Fatullayev had claimed that the project was funded by the Black Sea Trust (BST) of the German Marshall Fund. However, Amnesty International's inquiry to the BST revealed that the latter had no involvement in the project, contrary to Fatullayev's assertions. The BST Consultant on Azerbaijan, Mehriban Rahimli, stated that "the mention of BST with this project is not appropriate. BST has not funded or supported this study and its presentation." Furthermore, Fatullayev tried to attract support for the event by falsely claiming that Amnesty International was involved in it. He also circulated an agenda of the event which included details of a speaker from Amnesty International, despite the refusal of the latter to participate.

After finding this out Amnesty International cut ties with Fatullayev, criticizing him both for providing misinformation and for attempting to create a misconception of human rights violations by arguing that this phenomenon is as common in Germany as it is in Azerbaijan and using the reports of Amnesty International (their own report) on European countries as an example to prove his point.

In response Fatullayev harshly criticized Amnesty’s statement, accusing the group of retaliating for his criticism of the human rights situation in Germany. The organization replied: "While Amnesty International believes his [Fatullayev's] attempt to portray the extent and gravity of human rights abuses in Germany as on a par with violations in Azerbaijan is misleading, the organization entirely respects his right to express his views, on Germany or any other country".

As for the funding sources of the event Fatullayev gave no further information or clarification. Amnesty International's statement namely says:

Despite repeated requests, Fatullayev has been unwilling to disclose the true source of his funding. In light of this, Amnesty International has decided to discontinue any collaboration with Eynulla Fatullayev and his organization, the Azerbaijani Public Union for Human Rights. Any claims made by Mr. Fatullayev that Amnesty International is supporter or partner organization for his activities should be disregarded.

Turan Information Agency has made the following comment on the case of Fatullayev vs Amnesty International: "It's no secret that in Germany, as in other developed democratic countries, there are issues of corruption and human rights violations. However, the Azerbaijani model of government and public relations is too far from Europe. Therefore, the report by Fatullayev is an attempt from the Stone Age to criticize the human rights situation in bourgeois society."

== See also ==
- Human Rights in Azerbaijan
- Elmar Huseynov
- Jabbar Savalan
- Rauf Arifoghlu
