= Van Ferro =

Filipino-American actor

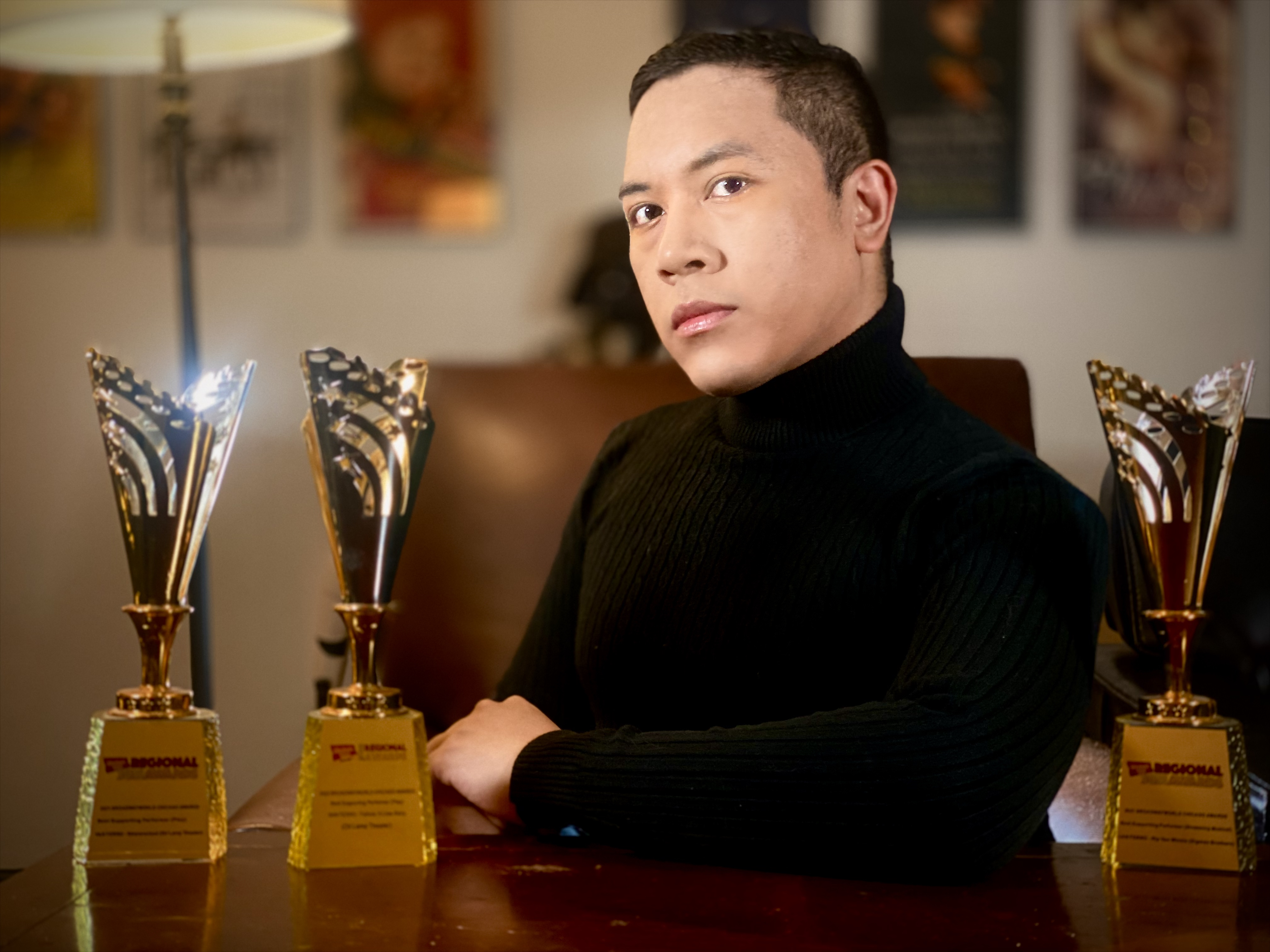
- Van Ferro in 2023
- Born: 1987 (age 38–39); Baguio, Philippines
- Citizenship: United States; Philippines
- Occupation: Actor
- Years active: 2018–present

Van Ferro (born 1987) is a Filipino-American film, television, stage and voiceover actor. He is the first actor of Filipino descent to win BroadwayWorld acting awards in Chicago in 2021 for his work in Chicago theater for that calendar year, as well as the first actor in Chicago to win two acting BroadwayWorld awards in the same theater season in 2021. He is also the first actor in Chicago to win back-to-back BroadwayWorld Awards in 2022 and made a three-peat in 2023, making him the actor of Filipino descent with the most BroadwayWorld Awards for acting outside of the Philippines. He has also appeared in television, most notably as a nurse in Chicago Med.

== Personal life ==
Ferro was born in Baguio, Philippines and originally dreamt of a career as a diplomat working for the U.S. Embassy in Manila. When he was a sophomore in high school, after watching Gone with the Wind (film), he decided to pursue a career as an actor in the United States. Ferro worked his way to community theater companies in the Chicago area such as Oak Lawn Park District and Munroe Park Theater Guild (MPTG), as well as numerous student films. He starred as Prof Friedrich Bhaer in Little Women, Jesus Costazuela in The Odd Couple (Female Version) for MPTG. He also appeared in Daniel Cooper's Bigger and Better Things (2011), winner of the Best Short Film award at the Maryland International Film Festival, and Michael Dooley's Furnished (2011), to name a few film projects. He decided to go professional as an actor in 2018.

Ferro was naturalized as a United States citizen in 2022. He reacquired his Filipino citizenship in 2023.

== Professional acting career ==
=== 2018 ===
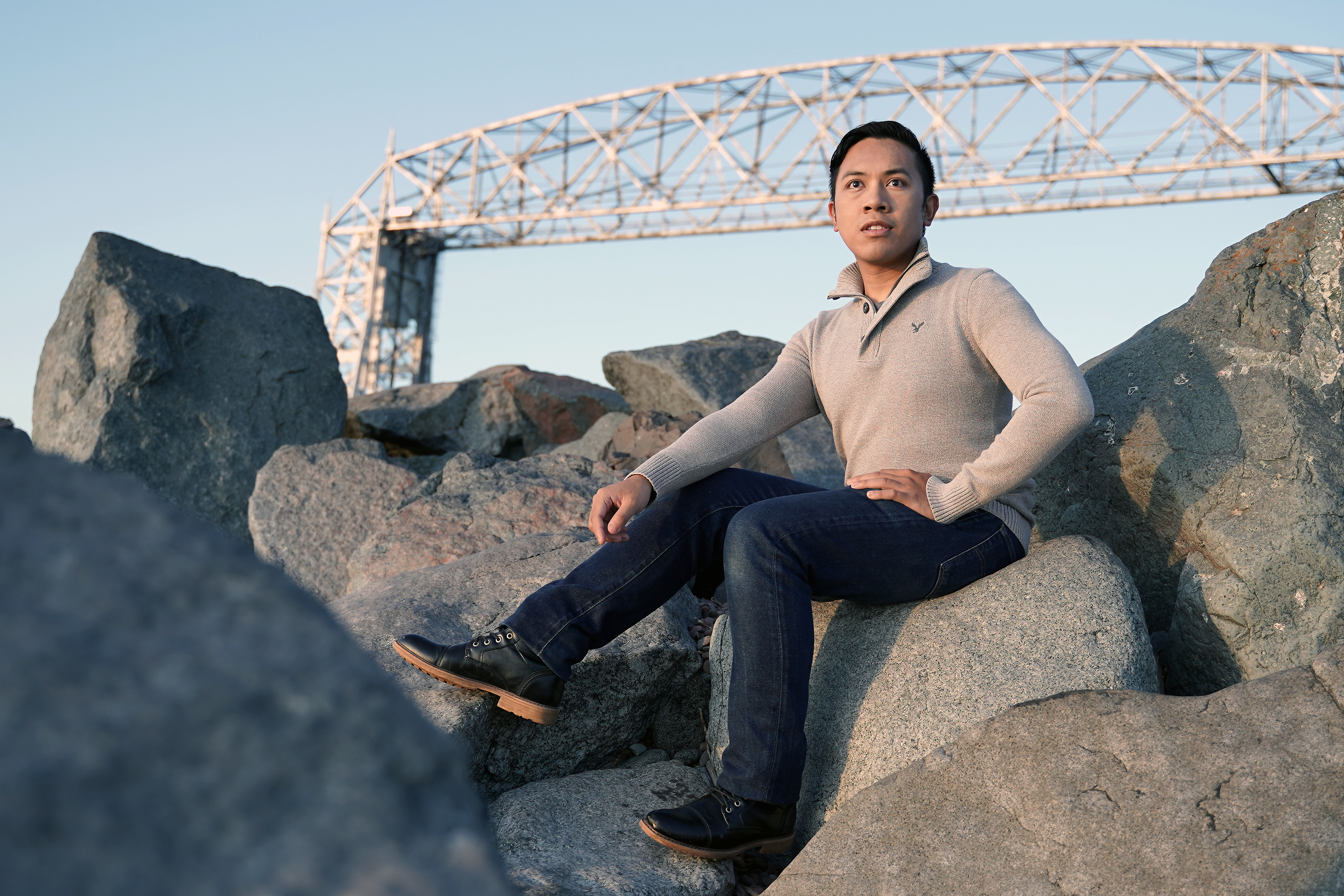
Van Ferro in a photo shoot at Duluth, MN in 2018.

Ferro started acting professionally after leaving his job as a registered nurse. In 2018, Ferro appeared in the Sigman Brothers' production of Rumpelstiltskin at Mainstage Theater in St. Charles, IL, which also led to him being featured on WGN-TV's Midday Morning News while doing press for the production. In the same year, Ferro also secured representation with Stavins Talent Agency, The Talent Networks, and Productions Plus. He also appeared in the short film Anak na Amerikana by Filipino auteur Rialin Jose, wearing prosthetics for the first time to age 30 years as Marcelo Mendoza, a distant father to a second-generation immigrant daughter.

=== 2019 ===
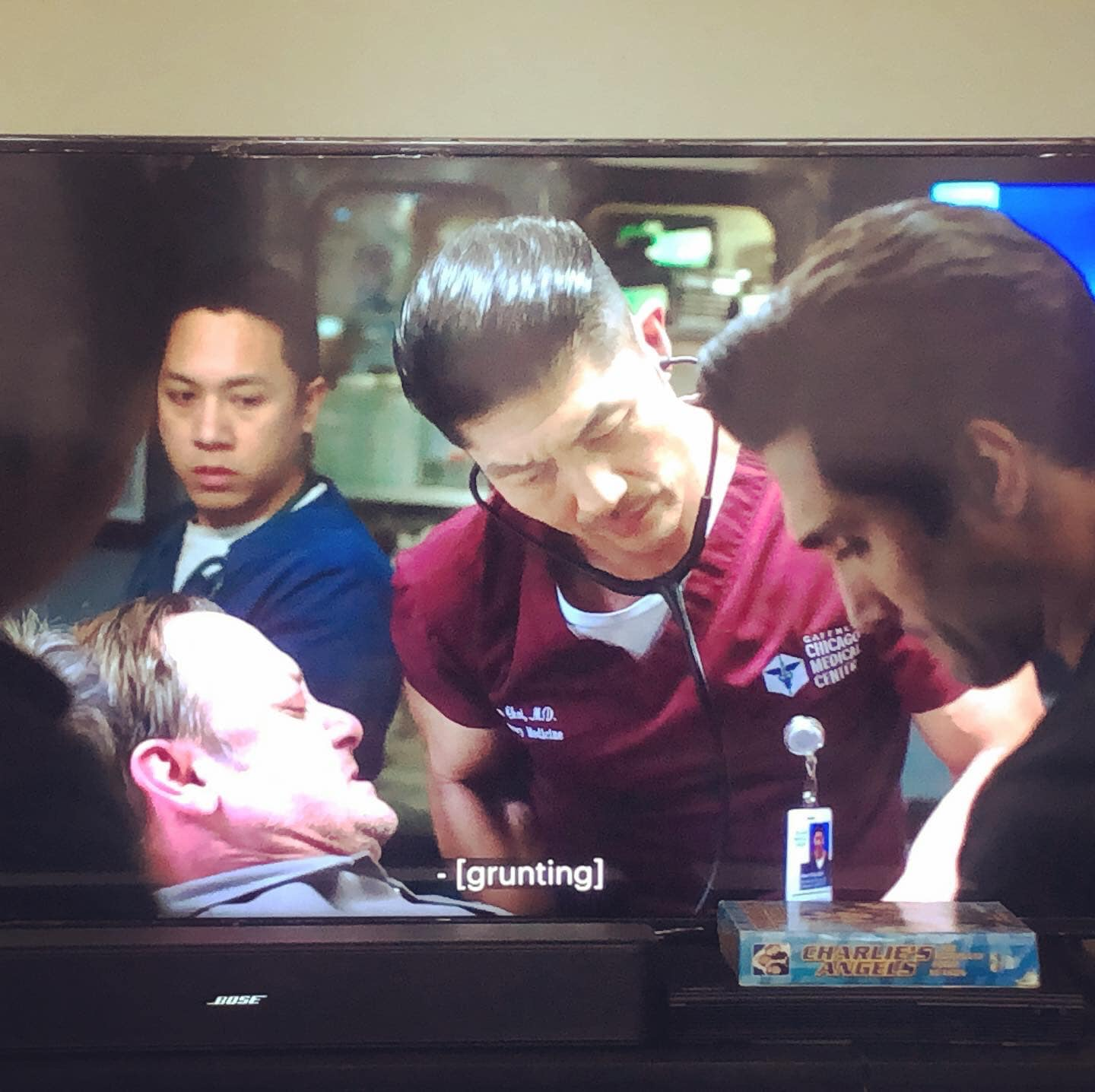
Van Ferro as an ER nurse alongside Brian Tee and Dominic Rains in Chicago Med.

In 2019, Ferro expanded his representation by adding Helen Wells Agency. He also appeared in Three Cat Productions' Heart of Fairy written by LaurA! Force Scruggs and Perjured Love by David Finney. He also appeared in Hampstead Stage Company's staged reading of I Never Saw Another Butterfly and appeared as Chiang Kai-Shek and Sinmay Zau in Jyl Bonaguro's Soong Sisters. He also appeared as a Japanese astronomer in Zach Cortino's Equinox, and Gail Gilbert's You Got Gail. Starting in the fall of 2019 as well, Ferro also joined the cast of Chicago Med as an ER nurse. Ferro also collaborated with Rialin Jose and appeared as the titular Aswang in the short Miss Aswang, which was an official entry to the Diwa Filipino Film Showcase in Seattle and Houston Asian American and Pacific Islander (HAAPI) Film Festival.

=== 2020 ===
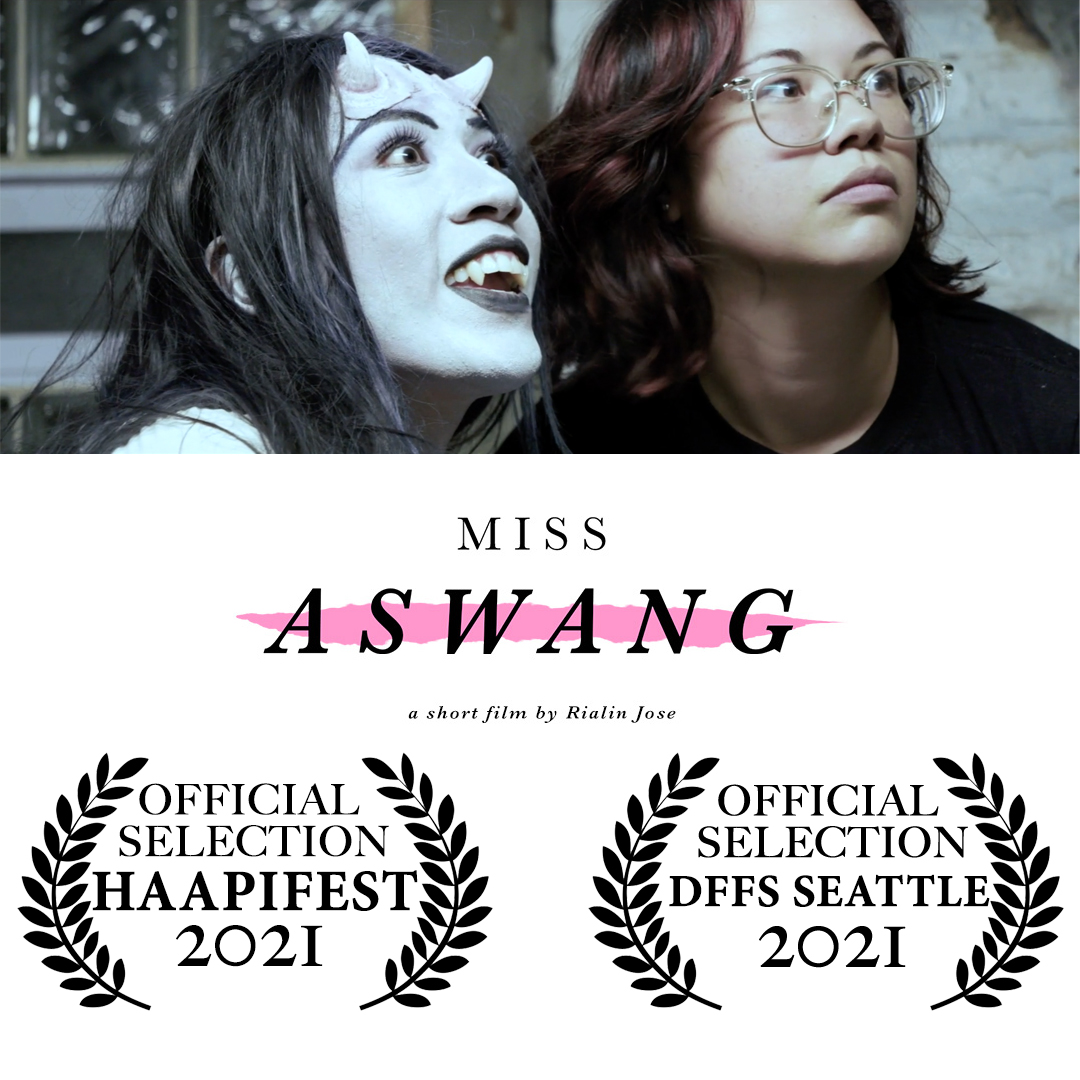
Van Ferro appeared as the titular Aswang in Miss Aswang (2021) by Rialin Jose.

In 2020, Ferro was due to come back to Sigman Brothers for an original musical, Rip Van Winkle, based on the short story by Washington Irving. As the coronavirus pandemic shut down theater productions across the world, Ferro decided to put up Vera Pictures, his own production company, to produce short-form videos such as Corona Diaries and Kitty Diaries, as well as a talk show in Filipino, YSchool, featuring real-life friends Maica Ayuyao and Yanni. Vera Pictures' productions have been airing on Facebook, YouTube and Instagram. He also transitioned to virtual theater with the group Act Your Page, led by Parker Sterling, in which he tackled complex roles such as Brick Pollitt in Tennessee Williams' Cat on a Hot Tin Roof, Michael Wells in Lee Blessing's Two Rooms, Bill Fordham in Tracy Letts' August: Osage County, Jerry Goss in Letts' Bug, Anthony Candolino in Terrence McNally's Master Class, and Alfieri in Arthur Miller's A View from the Bridge.

=== 2021 ===
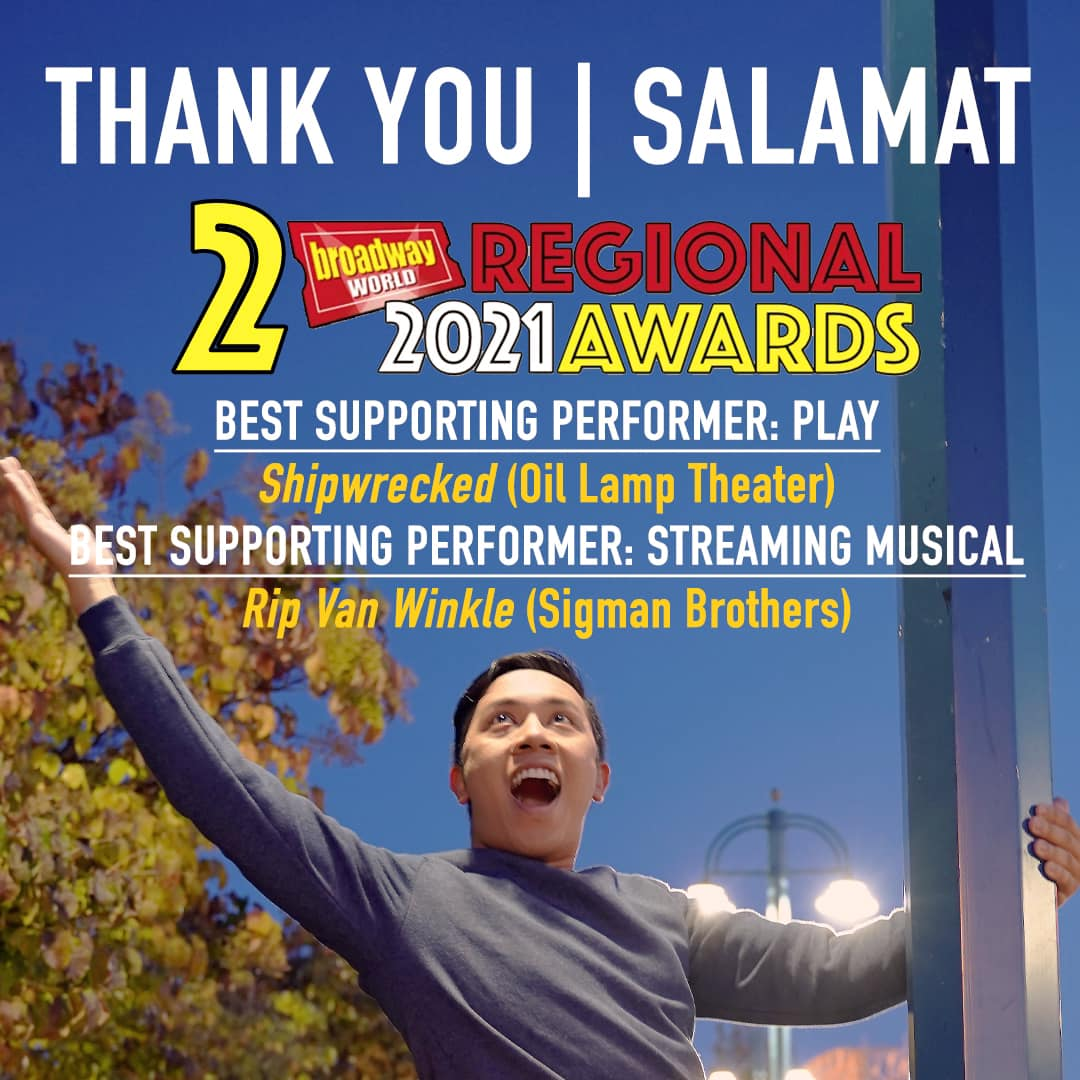
Van Ferro became the first actor of Filipino descent to win the BroadwayWorld Award in Chicago. He won two awards for the 2020–2021 season.

In 2021, Ferro was the understudy to Gabriel Fries in Metropolis Performing Arts Centre's production of Baskerville: A Sherlock Holmes Mystery. As theaters in Chicago have reopened in April, Ferro became involved in the process of rehearsing Sigman Brothers' delayed production of Rip Van Winkle, now airing as a streaming musical over Facebook Live. Ferro also appeared in Oil Lamp Theater's production of Shipwrecked: An Entertainment by Donald Margulies, which was the second of 2 productions of the theater company to be produced outdoors. Alan Bresloff of Around The Town Chicago writes, "...one of the highlights of the experience is Van Ferro ( player 2) who plays old men, dogs, babies, teen-agers and every other man in the show. He also does some women to show his wide range. He is worth the trip to Glenview...". The production was also cited as Highly Recommended by the magazine. Ferro is also appearing in Sigman Brothers' Christmas Sonata, an original musical written for the five actors playing in the production, for Christmas 2021.

On November 18, 2021, BroadwayWorld Chicago Awards nominated Ferro in two categories, Best Supporting Performer in a Play for his critically acclaimed turn in Shipwrecked; and Best Supporting Performer in a Streaming Musical for Rip Van Winkle. Ferro is the first Filipino actor in Chicago nominated for the regional audience award, after Rachelle Ann Go's nominations and eventual wins in the UK/West End edition of the BroadwayWorld Awards in 2014, 2015 and 2018.

=== 2022 ===
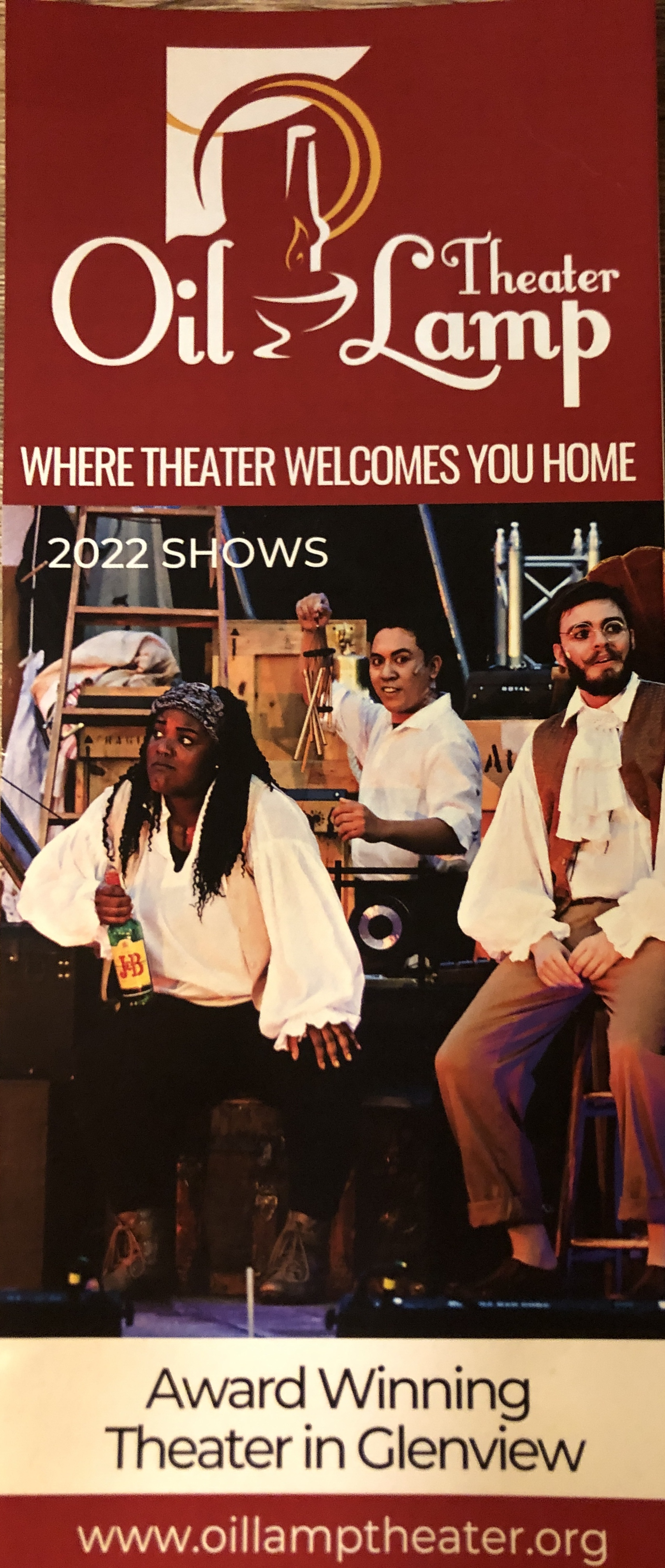
Van Ferro won the 2021 BroadwayWorld Award for Best Supporting Performer in a Play in Oil Lamp Theater's production of Donald Margulies' Shipwrecked: An Entertainment. PC: Gosia Photography

On January 8, 2022, Ferro won both awards, winning 61% of the vote for Best Supporting Performer in a Play and 35% of the votes for Best Supporting Actor in a Streaming Musical. Ferro also becomes the first actor in Chicago to win two awards in the same season. Fresh off of his BroadwayWorld Chicago Award wins, Ferro was next signed by DreamTeam Talent Agency, headed by Vilma Llaguno. He started the year with a staged reading of Marie Yuen's C2: Chinese Cinderella, produced by ENERI Communications and Fiery Seahorse Productions. He also tackled the lead roles of George in Bernard Slade's Same Time, Next Year and Pastor Joshua in Lucas Hnath's The Christians for Act Your Page. He also became involved with virtual experimental theater with Cock and Bull Arts with The Octopus. He came back to Oil Lamp Theater as John N. Fail in its production of Philip Dawkins' Failure: A Love Story, which was originally produced at Victory Gardens Theater in Chicago. Rick McCain of Let's Play Theatrical Reviews wrote, "...Van Ferro is comical as the short-wit John N." While appearing in this play, he also rehearsed and did a play with Corey Bradberry's A Theater in the Dark with its original production Murder in the Court of Xanadu, where Ferro plays multiple parts. He is next slated to appear in Sigman Brothers' first play production, In Memoriam, for Halloween 2022. On November 15, 2022, Ferro was once again nominated for Best Supporting Performer in a Play at the 2022 BroadwayWorld Chicago Awards for his turn as John N. Fail in Oil Lamp Theater's Failure: A Love Story, with the production garnering 8 more nominations including Best Play. On December 6, 2022, as part of the League of Chicago Theatres' showcase at one of the biggest Christkindlmarkets in the world, Ferro performed with A Theater in the Dark's mini-performance of A Christmas Carol with Laura Erle, Corey Bradberry, and Tyler DeLoatch. On December 31, 2022, as part of the Chicago theater awards season, Failure: A Love Story was chosen as one of the 24 Best of Chicago Theater productions by Picture This Post.

=== 2023 ===
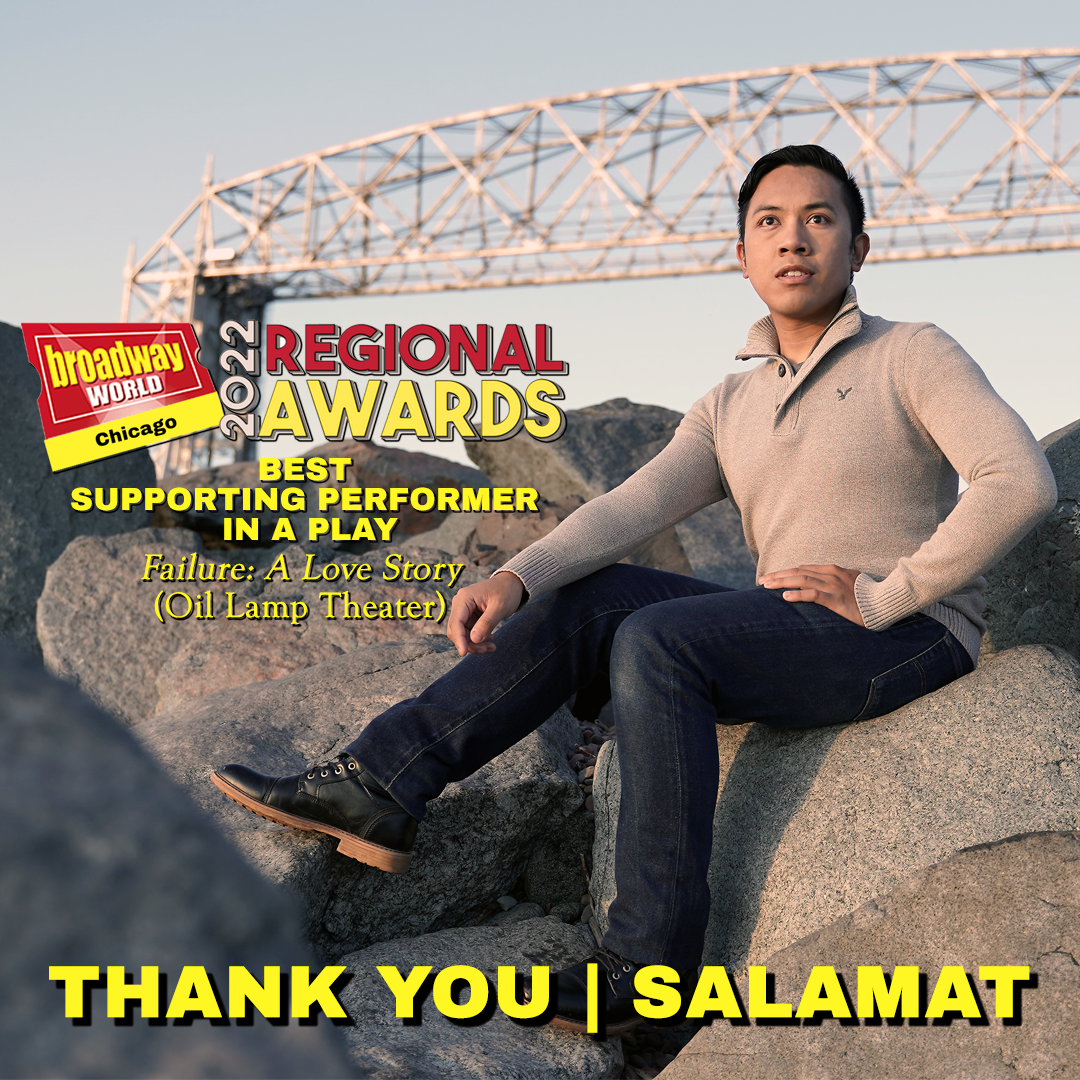
Van Ferro won the 2022 BroadwayWorld Award consecutively for Best Supporting Performer in a Play in Oil Lamp Theater's production of Philip Dawkins' Failure: A Love Story. PC: Janina Angeli Magundayao

Though his performances were not nominated, the Chicago Reader nominated three productions he starred in for the Best of 2022 list for Arts and Culture on January 18, 2023: Best Virtual Play for Same Time, Next Year and The Christians with Act Your Page; and Best Original Digital Content for Murder in the Court of Xanadu with A Theater in the Dark. On January 22, 2023, Ferro was announced as one of the new Artist Board members of the initiative and website Chicago Artist Guide, which aims to diversify theater casting and hiring in Chicago theater. The next day, BroadwayWorld announced that Ferro won his second consecutive (and third overall) BroadwayWorld Chicago Award for his performance as John N. Fail in Oil Lamp Theater's production of Failure: A Love Story. Ferro bested 61 other nominees with 16% of the votes. This production also won a consecutive Best Play Award for Oil Lamp as well. This also ties the record for most BroadwayWorld Awards won by a Filipino actor outside of the Philippines along with Rachelle Ann Go. Ferro was also elected President of the Artist Auxiliary Board of the Chicago Artist Guide on January 29, 2023. On February 15, 2023, Ferro joined the play selection committee as Jury Member to decide the official play selections at the 1st Asian, Pacific Islander, Desi-American (APIDA) Arts Festival in Chicago, IL. The plays selected by the jury are slated to be performed on May 5–7, 2023 at the Goodman Theatre, Chicago Cultural Center and Museum of Contemporary Art. On May 15, 2023, Ferro officially joined Actors' Equity and represented the Chicago Artist Guide at the 55th annual Equity Jeff Awards on October 2, 2023. On November 2, 2023, Ferro was nominated for a fourth BroadwayWorld Chicago Award for Best Supporting Performer in a Play (his third consecutive in the category) for his riveting performances as the Actor with Many Parts in Murder in the Court of Xanadu with A Theater in the Dark, playing a set of villains against Gabriel Fries. On December 6, 2023, Ferro became the first actor of Filipino descent to be nominated in the Best Stage Actor category of the Chicago Reader’s Best of 2023 list. Because of his recent successes, as well as the fact that 23 nominations for the BroadwayWorld Chicago Awards that year went to Filipino-American artists, Ferro is credited as one of the people to have ushered the Filipino Wave in Chicago theater.

=== 2024 ===
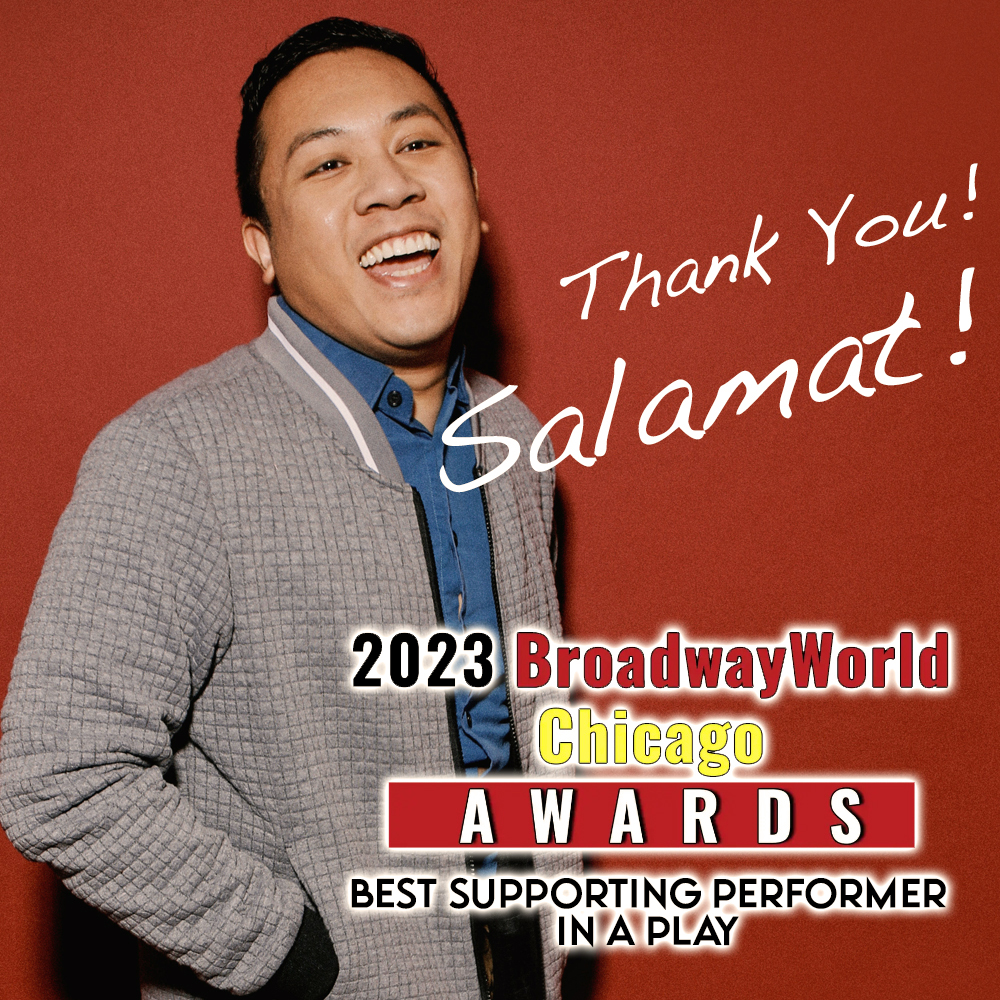
Ferro won a three-peat for the Best Supporting Performer in a Play category in 2024. PC: 2345Studio

On January 12, 2024, BroadwayWorld Chicago announced Ferro's third consecutive win in the Best Supporting Performer in a Play category for A Theater in the Dark's A Murder in the Court of Xanadu, which also won Best Sound Design for a Play/Musical for director Corey Bradberry. This win made Ferro the most awarded actor of Filipino descent in BroadwayWorld history working outside of the Philippines.

== Awards and nominations ==
Theater Awards
Year	Award	Result	Category	Production/Role
2024	Chicago Reader Best of Chicago 2023	Nominated	Best Stage Actor	
2024	BroadwayWorld Chicago Award	Won	Best Supporting Performer in a Play	A Murder in the Court of Xanadu (A Theater in the Dark) / An Actor with Many Parts
2023	BroadwayWorld Chicago Award	Won	Best Supporting Performer in a Play	Failure: A Love Story (Oil Lamp Theater) / John N. Fail
2022	BroadwayWorld Chicago Award	Won	Best Supporting Performer in a Play	Shipwrecked: An Entertainment (Oil Lamp Theater) / Player 2
2022	BroadwayWorld Chicago Award	Won	Best Supporting Performer in a Streaming Musical	Rip Van Winkle (Sigman Brothers) / Head Dwarf

== Memberships/Organizations ==
Year	Position	Event/Organization
2023–present	Member	Actors Equity
2023–present	Artist Board - President	Chicago Artist Guide
2023	Jury Member - Selection Committee	1st APIDA Arts Festival
