= List of Christmas markets =

This is a list of Christmas markets from around the world.

Christmas markets are listed using their unique name. The list is ordered by continent and then by country.

== Worldwide Christmas markets ==
=== Europe ===
==== Austria ====
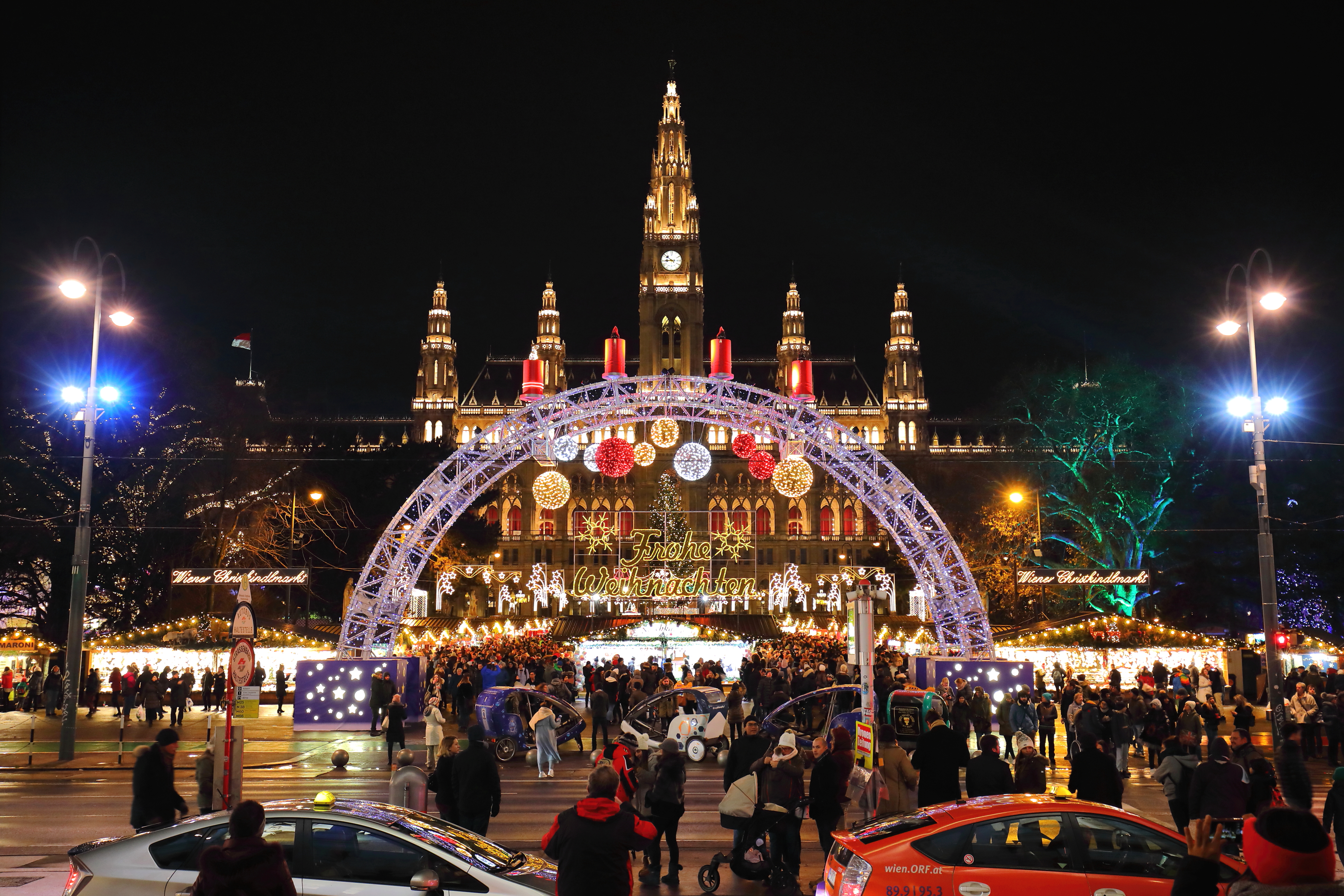
Rathaus in Vienna and Christkindlmarkt in front of it

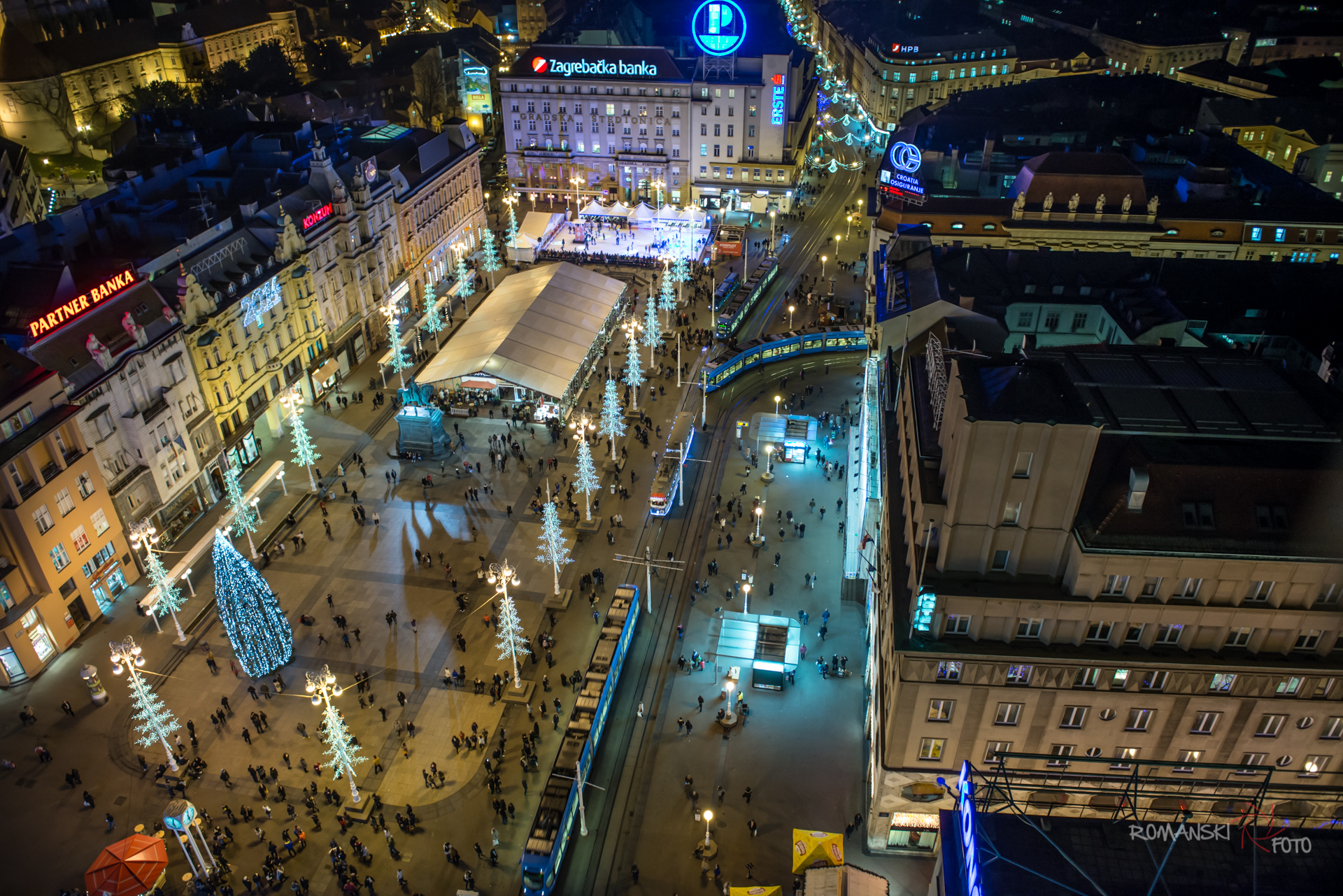
Zagreb Christmas market (Zagreb Advent)

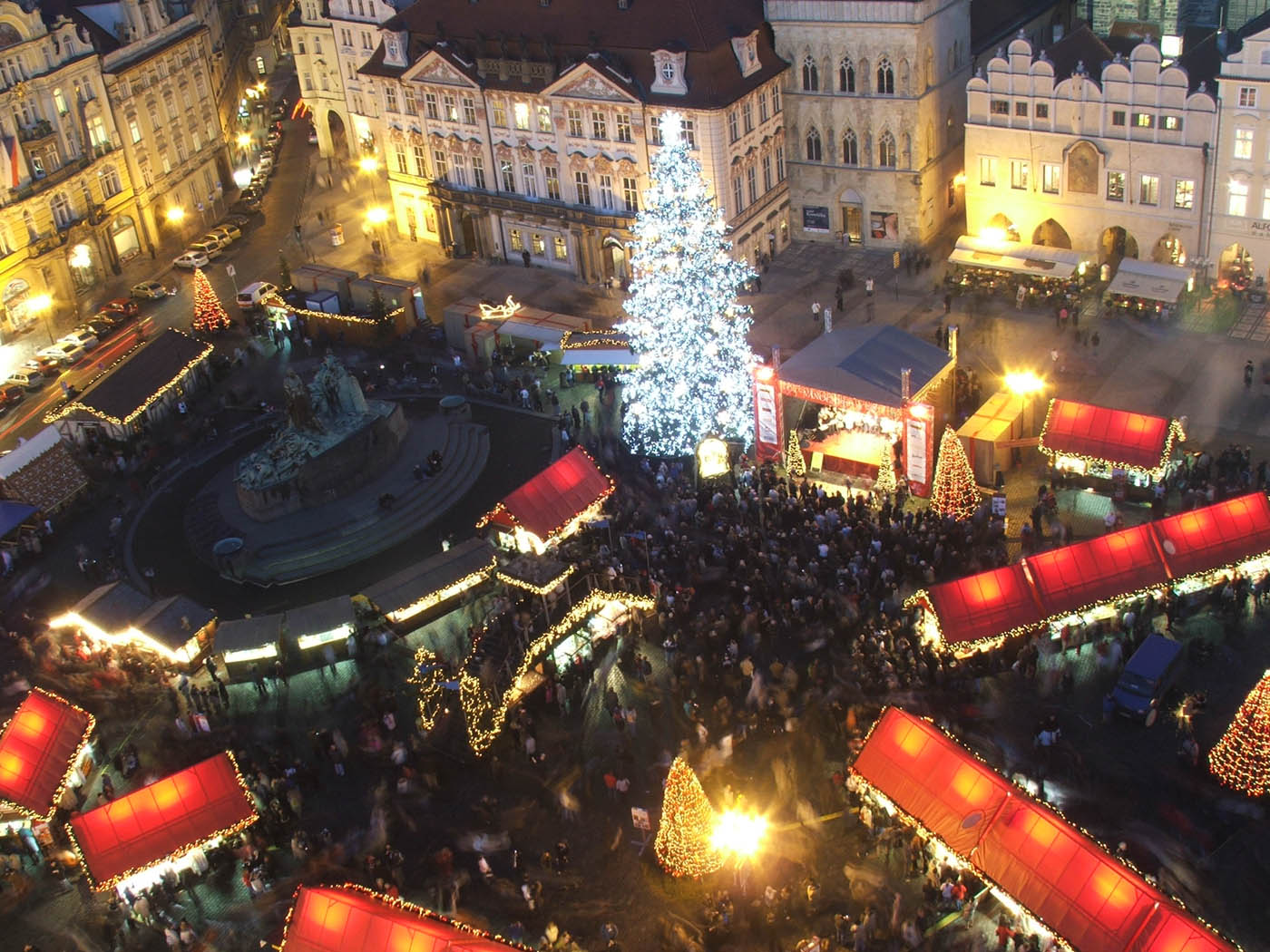
Christmas market in Prague

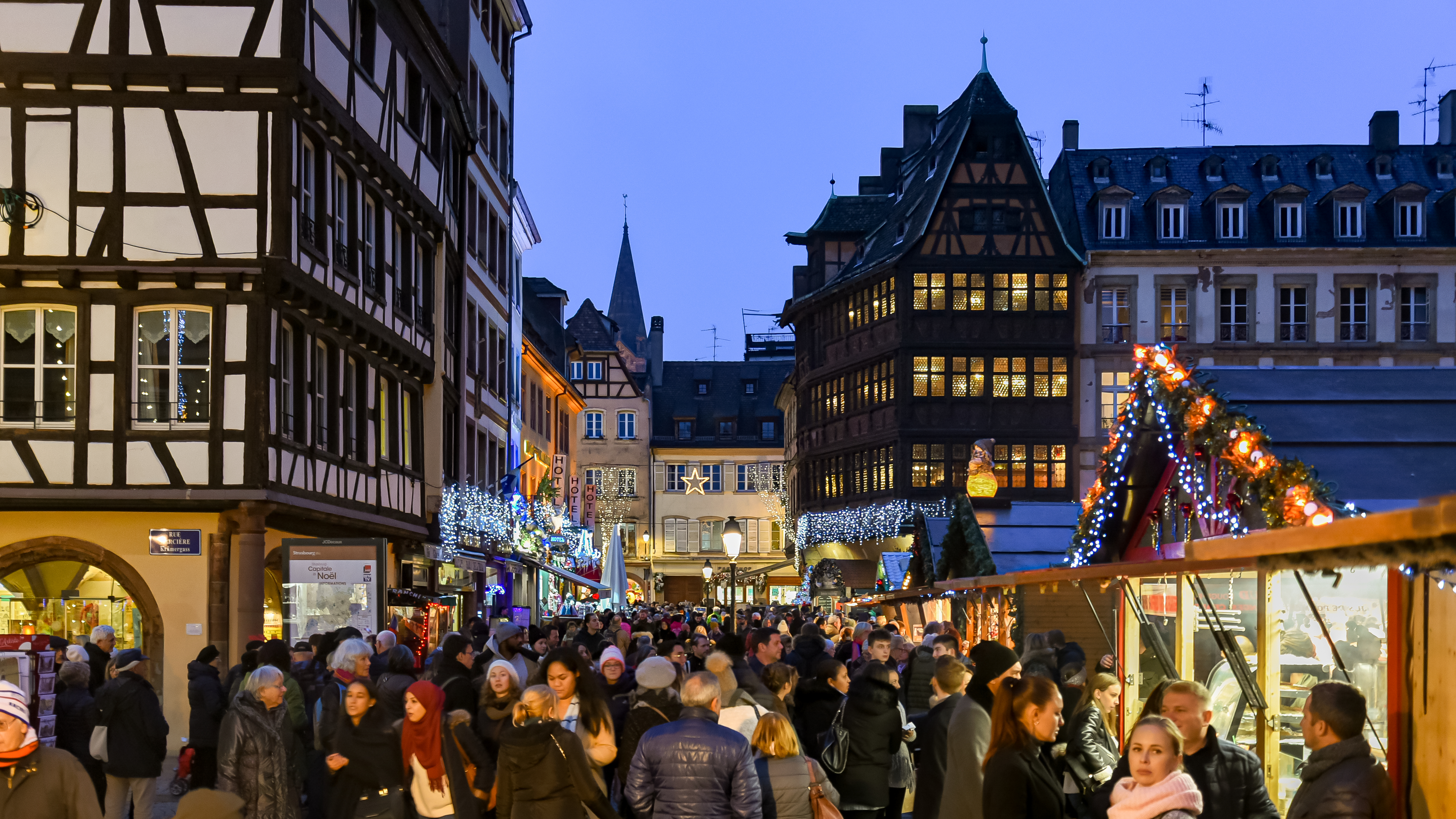
Strasbourg Christmas market

- Christkindlmarkt – Innsbruck, Tyrol
- Christkindlmarkt – Salzburg, Salzburg
- Christkindlmarkt Rathaus – Vienna, Vienna
- Christkindlmarkt Karlsplatz– Vienna, Vienna
- Christkindlmarkt – Villach, Carinthia
- Weihnachtsmarkt – Salzburg, Salzburg

==== Azerbaijan ====
- Fountains Square Christmas Market – Fountains Square, Baku

==== Belgium ====
- Winter Wonders – Brussels
- Village de Noël de Liège – Liège
- Bruges Christmas Market – Bruges

==== Bosnia and Herzegovina ====
- Sarajevo Holiday Market – Sarajevo

==== Bulgaria ====
- Deutscher Weihnachtsmarkt Sofia

==== Croatia ====
- Advent in Zagreb – Zagreb Christmas Market

==== Czech Republic ====
- Vanocni trhy – Prague
- Vanocni trhy – Brno

==== Denmark ====
- Christianias Julemarked – Christianshavn/Christiania, Copenhagen
- Jul i Den Gamle By – The Old Town, Aarhus
- Tivolis Julemarked – Inner City, Copenhagen
- Fields Jule by – Fields Shopping Center Copenhagen Ørestad
- Axeltorv Christmas market 2023 – Axeltorv just in front of Tivoli Gardens in Copenhagen city center

==== Estonia ====
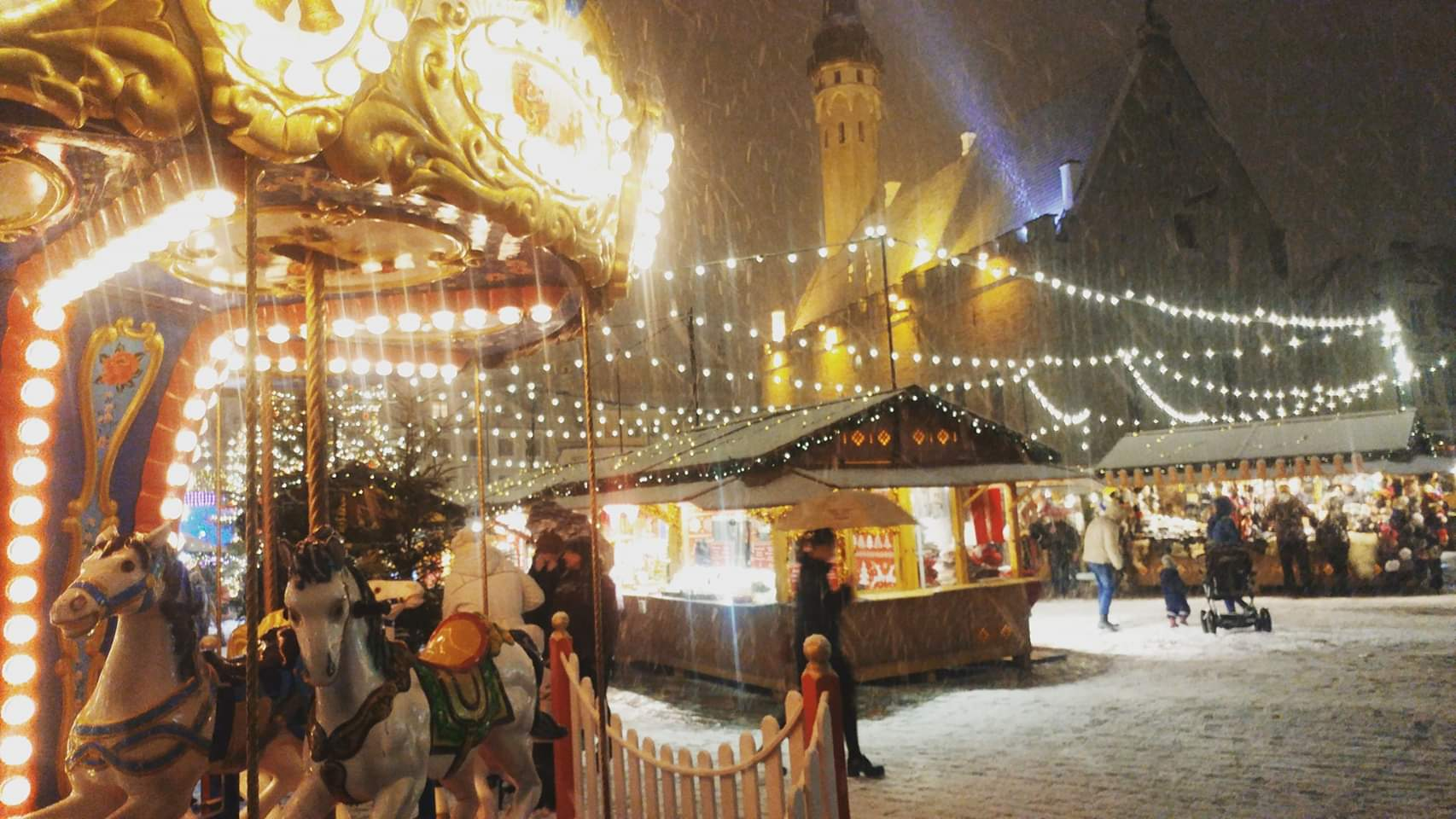
Tallinn Christmas market view during a snow fall

- Tallinn Christmas Market – Tallinn

==== Finland ====
- Tampereen Joulutori, Central Square, Tampere
- Tuomaan Markkinat, Senate Square, Helsinki
- Turun Joulutori, Market Square, Turku

==== France ====
- Christmas Market, Angers, Pays de la Loire
- Five Christmas Markets – Colmar, Alsace
- Christmas Market, Lyon
- Christmas Market, Metz
- Christmas Market of the Alpes/Marché de Noël des montagnes, Grenoble
- Christmas Market, Mulhouse, Alsace
- Christmas Market, Nantes, Pays de la Loire
- Christmas Market, Sélestat, Alsace
- Christkindelsmärik – Strasbourg, Alsace
- Village de Noël (Christmas Village), Reims, Champagne
- Christmas Market, Valbonne, Alpes Maritimes

==== Germany ====
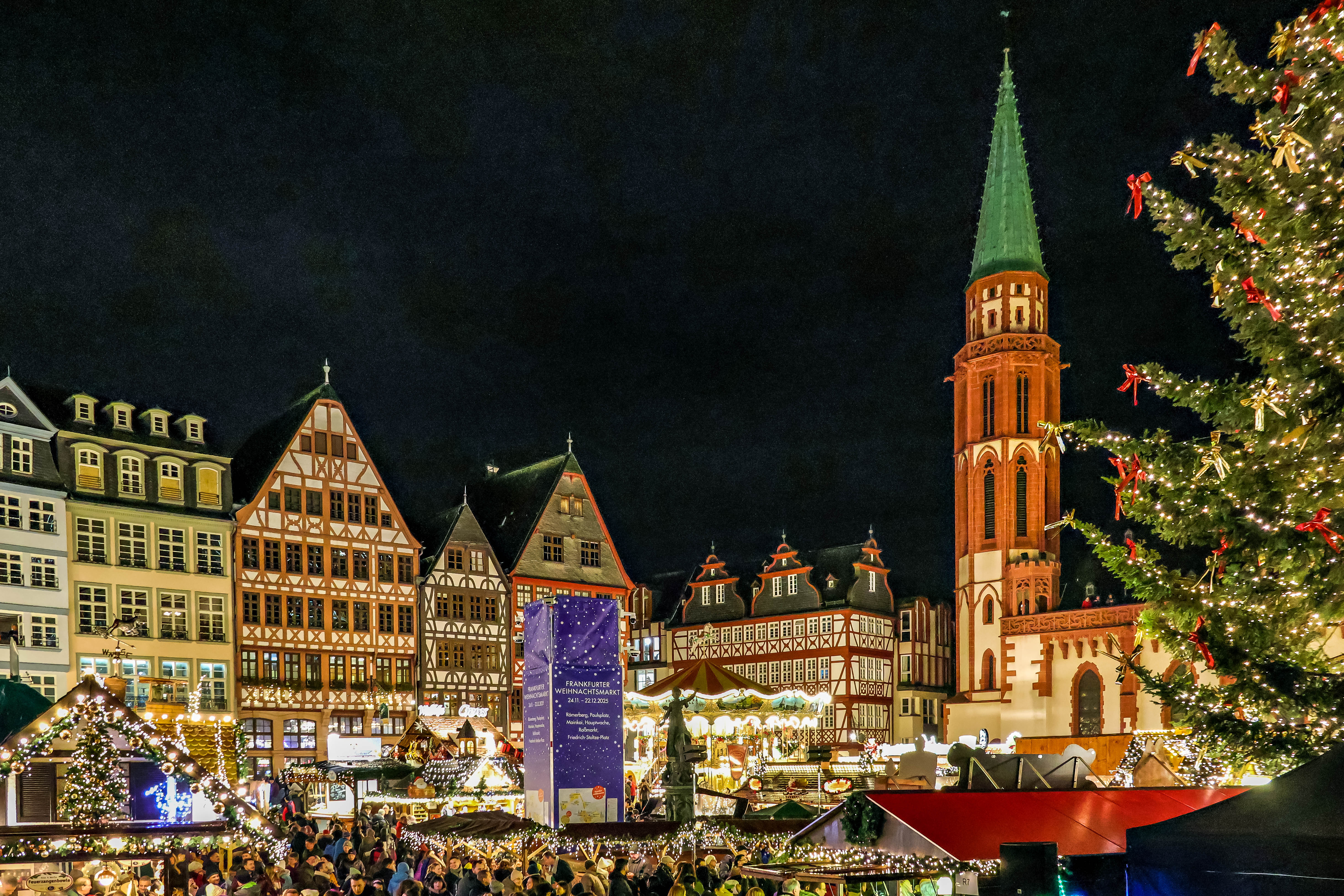
In Frankfurt

- Berlin
  - Berliner Kinderweihnachtsmarkt
  - Spandauer Weihnachtsmarkt
  - Weihnachtszauber market in Gendarmenmarkt
  - Nostalgischer Weihnachtsmarkt
  - Christmas Avenue (queer)
- Christkindlesmarkt – Karlsruhe, Baden-Württemberg
- Christkindlesmarkt – Nuremberg, Bavaria
- Christkindlesmarkt – Passau, Bavaria
- Christkindlmarkt – Regensburg, Bavaria
- Christkindlmarkt – Munich, Bavaria
- Christkindlesmarkt – Augsburg, Bavaria
- Erfurter Weihnachtsmarkt – Erfurt, Thuringia
- Chemnitzer Weihnachtsmarkt – Chemnitz, Saxony
- Leipziger Weihnachtsmarkt – Leipzig, Saxony
- Magdeburger Weihnachtsmarkt – Magdeburg, Saxony-Anhalt
- Mainzer Weihnachtsmarkt – Mainz, Rhineland-Pfalz
- Märchenmarkt – Gera, Thuringia
- Märchenweihnachtsmarkt – Kassel, Hesse
- Striezelmarkt – Dresden, Saxony
- Weihnachtsmarkt – Aachen, North Rhine-Westphalia
- Weihnachtsmarkt – Ansbach, Bayern
- Weihnachtsmarkt – Bad Homburg, Hesse
- Weihnachtsmarkt – Bonn, North Rhine-Westphalia
- Weihnachtsmarkt – Braunschweig, Lower Saxony
- Weihnachtsmarkt am Schloss – Cuxhaven, Lower Saxony
- Cuxhavener Weihnachtszauber - Cuxhaven, Lower Saxony
- Weihnachtsmarkt – Bremen, Free Hanseatic City of Bremen
- Weihnachtsmarkt – Cologne, North Rhine-Westphalia
- Weihnachtsmarkt – Dortmund, North Rhine-Westphalia
- Weihnachtsmarkt – Düsseldorf, North Rhine-Westphalia
- Weihnachtsmarkt – Essen, North Rhine-Westphalia
- Weihnachtsmarkt – Frankfurt am Main, Hesse
- Weihnachtsmarkt – Hamburg, Hamburg-Mitte borough
- Weihnachtsmarkt – Heidelberg, Baden-Württemberg
- Weihnachtsmarkt – Koblenz, Rheinland-Pfalz
- Weihnachtsmarkt – Lübeck, Schleswig-Holstein
- Weihnachtsmarkt – Münster, North Rhine-Westphalia
- Weihnachtsmarkt – Pforzheim, Baden-Württemberg
- Weihnachtsmarkt – Rostock, Mecklenburg-Vorpommern
- Weihnachtsmarkt – Stuttgart, Baden-Württemberg
- Sternschnuppenmarkt Twinkling Star Market – Wiesbaden, Hesse
- Weihnachtsmarkt – Würzburg, Bayern
- Weihnachtsmarkt – Windsbach, Bayern
- Weihnachtsmarkt – Schweinfurt, Bayern

==== Hungary ====
- Budapest Christmas Fair – Budapest, Hungary

==== Italy ====
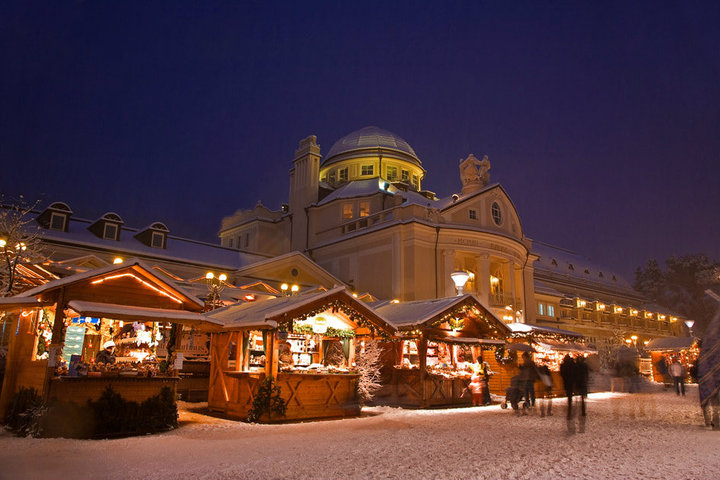
Christmas market in Merano

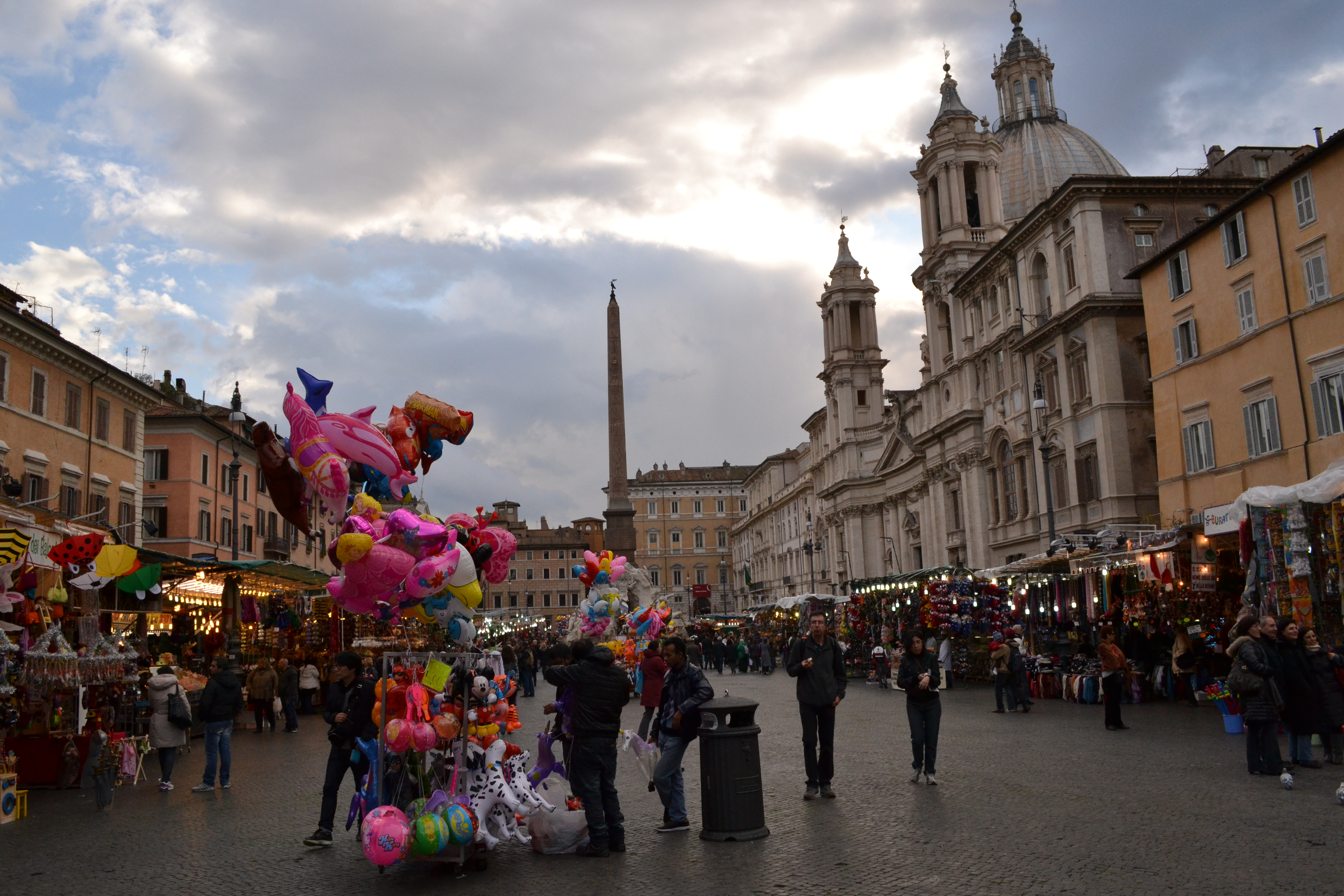
Christmas market at Piazza Navona in Rome

- Aosta Valley
  - Mercatino di Natale – Aosta
- Apulia
  - Mercatino di Natale – Alberobello
- Emilia-Romagna
  - Mercatino di Natale – Bologna
- Campania
  - Mercatino di via San Gregorio Armeno – Naples
- Friuli-Venezia Giulia
  - Mercatino di Natale – Trieste
- Lazio
  - Mercatino di Natale – Piazza Navona – Rome
- Lombardy
  - Mercatino di Natale – Livigno
- Piedmont
  - Mercatino di Natale – Asti
  - Mercatino di Natale – Santa Maria Maggiore
  - Mercatino di Natale – Turin
- Trentino-Alto Adige
  - Mercatino di Natale – Trento
  - Mercatino di Natale – Arco
  - Mercatino di Natale – Christkindlmarkt – Bolzano
  - Bosco Incantato – Winterwald – Bolzano
  - Meraner Advent – Natale a Merano – Merano
  - Weihnachtsmarkt – Mercatino di Natale – Bressanone
  - Weihnachtsmarkt – Mercatino di Natale – Vipiteno
  - Weihnachtsmarkt – Mercatino di Natale – Brunico
- Tuscany
  - Mercatino di Natale – Arezzo
  - Mercatino di Natale – Florence
- Umbria
  - Mercatino di Natale – Gubbio
- Veneto
  - Mercatino di Natale – Cison di Valmarino
  - Mercatino di Natale – Verona

==== Latvia ====
- Riga Christmas Market (Rīgas Ziemassvētku tirdziņš) – Riga

==== Luxembourg ====
- Winterlights Luxembourg City

==== Netherlands ====
- Kerstmarkt Dordrecht – Dordrecht, South Holland

==== Norway ====
- Julebyen Egersund Egersund

==== Poland ====
- Christmas Market – Kraków, Lesser Poland
- Christmas Market – Wrocław, Lower Silesia (largest in Poland)
- Christmas Market – Warsaw, Masovia
- Christmas Market – Gdańsk, Pomerania
- Christmas Market – Toruń, Kuyavia-Pomerania
- Poznanskie Betlejem – Poznań, Greater Poland
- Christmas Market – Katowice, Silesia
- Christmas Market – Pszczyna, Silesia
- Christmas Town – Rzeszów, Subcarpathian

==== Romania ====
- Christmas Market – Bucharest
- Christmas Market (Târgul de Crăciun) – Sibiu, Sibiu County – 18 November to 3 January

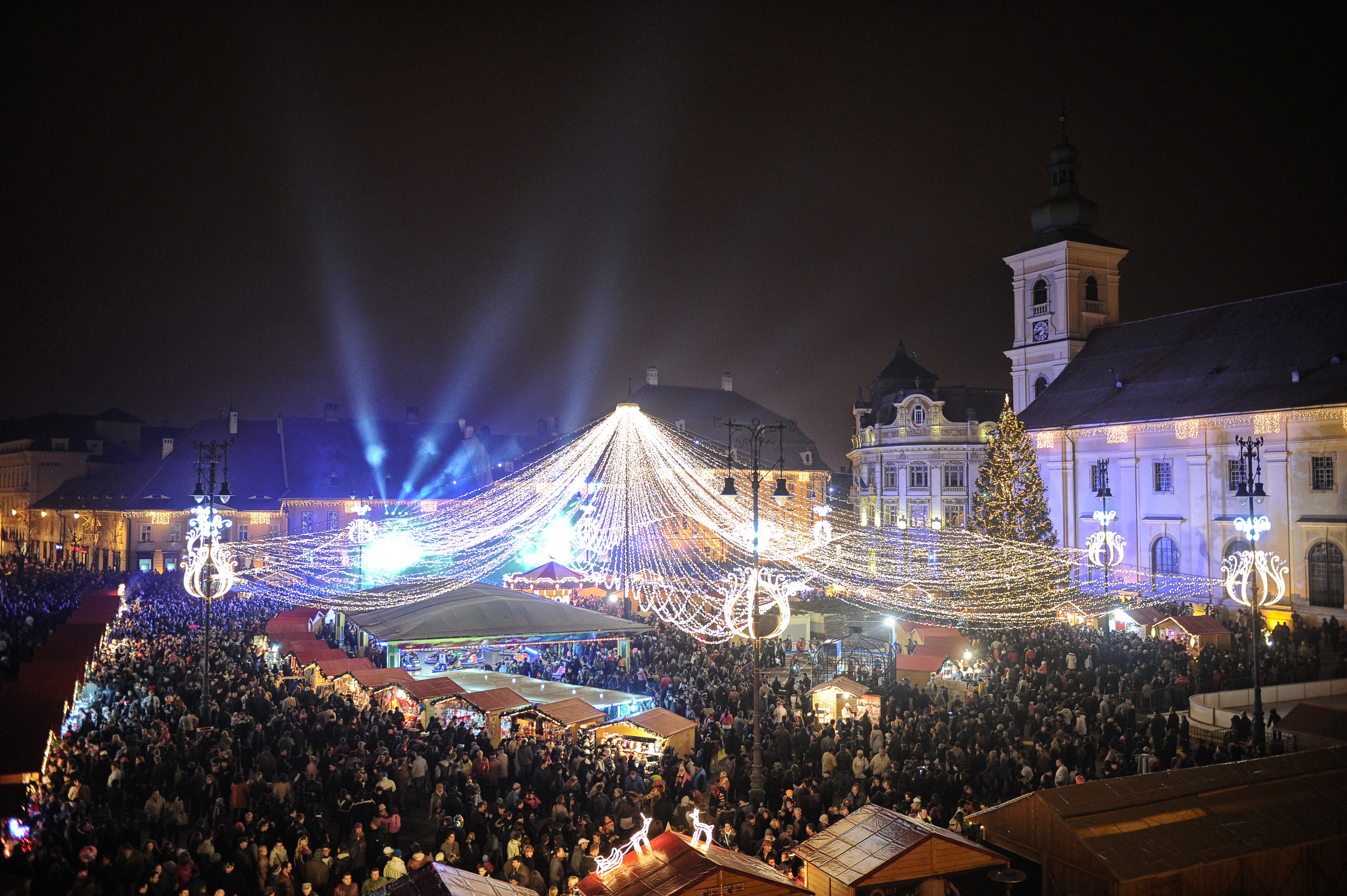
Sibiu Christmas Market 2012

- Christmas Market (Târgul de Crăciun) – Cluj-Napoca, Cluj County – 1 to 26 December
- Christmas Market (Târgul de Crăciun) – Timișoara, Timiș County
- Christmas Market (Târgul de Crăciun) – Oradea, Bihor County
- Christmas Market (Târgul de Crăciun) – Sighișoara, Mureș County −18 to 23 December
- Christmas/Winter Market (Târgul de Crăciun/Iarnă) – Arad, Arad County – usually held between 1 December (National Day of Romania) until the Epiphany 7/8 January

==== Russia ====
- Christmas market on Red Square (GUM yarmarka) – Moscow, December – 1 March. The largest Christmas market in Russia and the CIS
- Saint Petersburg Christmas market – Saint Petersburg, 7 December – 8 January. It is located on the Palace Square in the historical center of St. Petersburg
- "It's warm in the North!" – Murmansk, 21 December – 8 January
- Tula Christmas market – Tula, 31 December – 8 January
- Kalaningrad Christmas market – Kaliningrad
- Kremlin Christmas market – Kazan, Tatarstan
- Russian Christmas (Russian: Ру́сское Рождество́, romanized: Russkoye Rozhdestvo) – Shuya, Ivanovo Oblast. 5 to 8 January. It is positioned as a Christmas market with a focus on Russian Orthodox Christmas.

==== Serbia ====
- Winter Fest – Novi Sad, Serbia

==== Slovakia ====
- Bratislavské Vianoce – Bratislava, Slovakia

==== Sweden ====
- Skansen Christmas market – A historic Christmas market dating back to 1903.
- Malmö Christmas market – Traditional Christmas market. The biggest Christmas event in the heart of the city.
- Göteborg Christmas market – Traditional Christmas market. One of the best and biggest Christmas markets in Gothenburg

==== Switzerland ====
- Christkindlimarkt – Zürich

==== United Kingdom ====
===== England =====
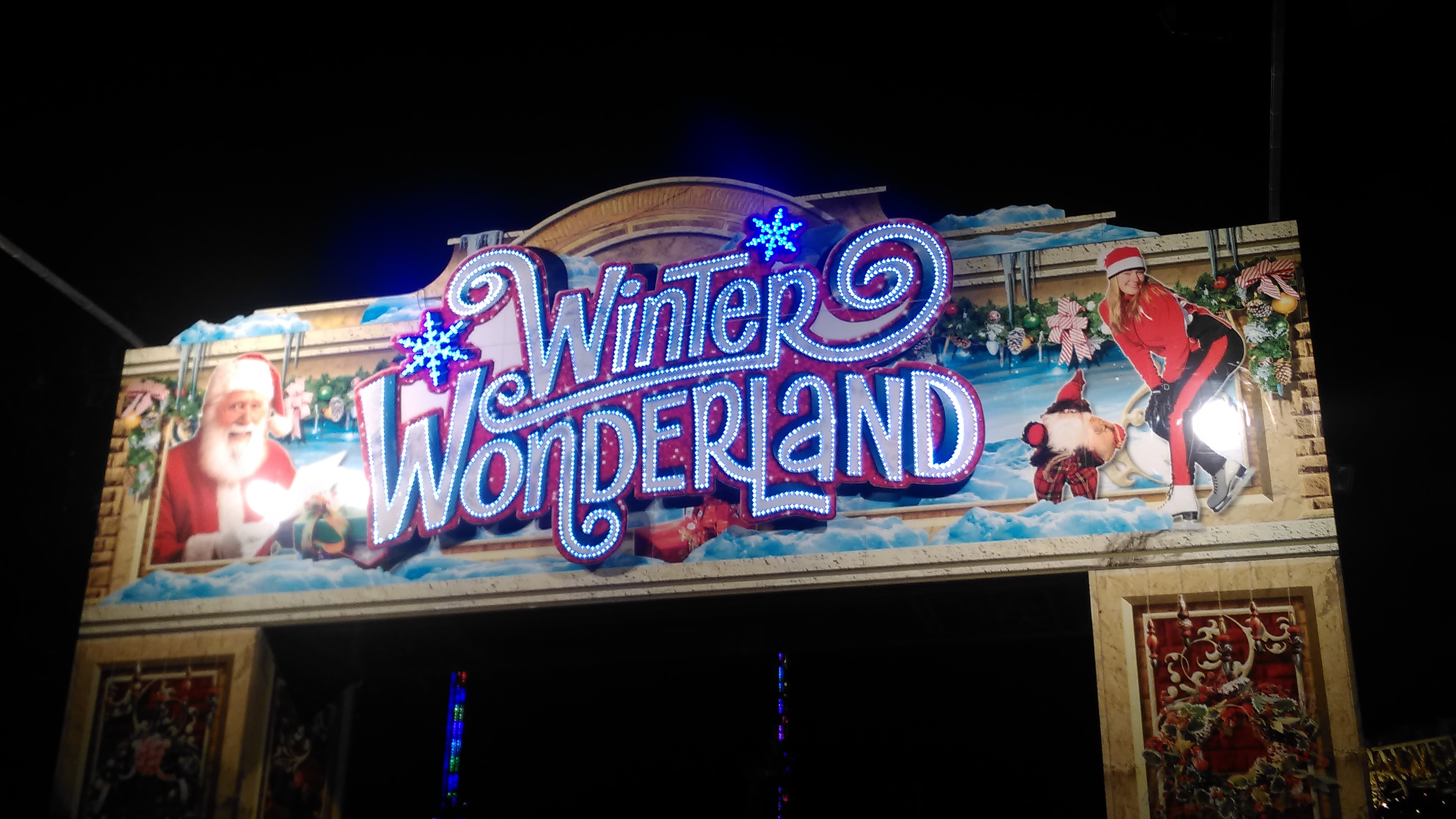
Hyde Park Winter Wonderland Christmas Market, London

- Bath Christmas Market – Bath, Somerset
- Beverley Festival of Christmas – Beverley, East Yorkshire
- Birmingham Christmas Market and Craft Fair – Birmingham
- Bournemenouth Christmas Market – Bournemouth, Dorset
- Bristol Christmas Market – Bristol
- Chester Christmas Market – Chester, Cheshire
- Exeter Christmas Market – Exeter, Devon
- Frankfurt Christmas Market – Birmingham
- Frankfurt Christmas Market – Leeds
- Lincoln Christmas Market – Lincoln (1982–2022)
- Liverpool Christmas Market – Liverpool
- Bankside Winter Market – Bankside, London
- Cologne Christmas Market at Southbank Centre (from Cologne) – Bankside, London
- Hyde Park Winter Wonderland Christmas Market – Hyde Park, London
- Manchester Christmas Markets – Manchester
- Newcastle Christmas Markets – Grey's Monument, Newcastle upon Tyne
- Victorian Festival of Christmas – Portsmouth Historic Dockyard, Portsmouth
- Waddesdon Manor Christmas Market – Waddesdon Manor
- Winchester Cathedral Christmas Market – Winchester, Hampshire
- The Winter Forest – Broadgate, London
- Alton Towers – Staffordshire, West Midlands.
- Keech Christmas Market, Barnfield College, Luton.
- Leighton Buzzard Christmas Psychic & Wellbeing Fair, Leighton Buzzard, Bedfordshire.
- Flitwick Christmas Special Foodie Fest, Flitwick, Bedfordshire.
- Huntingdon Christmas Market, Huntingdon, Cambridgeshire.

===== Northern Ireland =====
Belfast Continental Christmas Market, City Hall, Belfast

===== Scotland =====
- Aberdeen Christmas Village – Aberdeen
- Edinburgh
  - Edinburgh Highland Village Christmas Market
  - Edinburgh Traditional German Christmas Market
- Glasgow Traditional Christmas Market – Glasgow
  - St Enoch Christmas market.

===== Wales =====
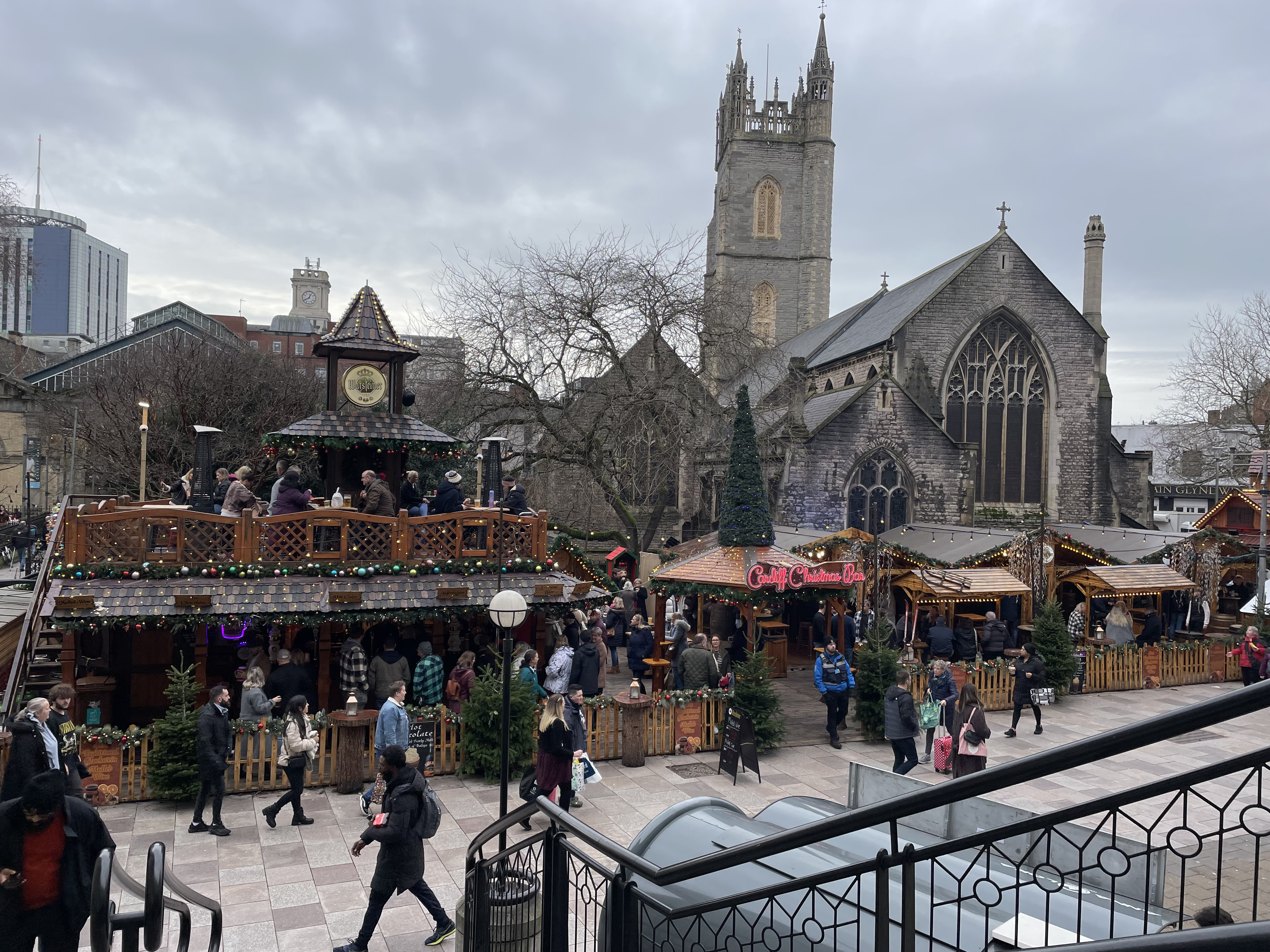
Cardiff Christmas Market

- Cardiff Christmas Market – Cardiff
- Cambrian Christmas Market – Colwyn Bay

=== North America ===
==== Canada ====
- Christkindl Market – Kitchener, Ontario
- Christkindl Market – Winnipeg, Manitoba
- Marché de Noël allemand – Quebec, Quebec
- Toronto Christmas Market – Distillery District, Toronto
- Vancouver Christmas Market – Vancouver, British Columbia

==== United States ====
- Atlanta Christkindl Market - Atlanta, Georgia (Held in Lawrenceville, Georgia for 2025)
- Canandaigua Christkindl Market – Canandaigua, New York
- Carmel Christkindlmarkt – Carmel, Indiana
- Christkindl Market – Arlington, Texas
- Christkindlmarkt – Baltimore, Maryland
- Christkindlmarkt – Bethlehem, Pennsylvania
- Christkindlmarkt – Cape Coral, Florida
- Christkindlmarket – Chicago, Illinois
- Christkindlmarkt - Cullman, Alabama
- Christkindl Market – Denver, Colorado
- Christkindlmarket Des Moines – Des Moines, Iowa
- Christkindlmarkt – Ferdinand, Indiana
- Christkindlmarkt – Front Royal, Virginia
- Christkindlmarkt - Salt Lake City, Utah
- Christkindlmarkt – Helen, Georgia
- Christkindlmarkt – Leavenworth, Washington
- Christkindl Market – Mifflinburg, Pennsylvania
- Christkindlmarkt – Monroe, Wisconsin – Turner Hall
- Christkindlmarkt – Rolla, Missouri
- Christkindlmarkt - Roswell, Georgia - Bulloch Hall
- Christkindlmarkt – Tulsa, Oklahoma
- Christmas Village – Philadelphia, Pennsylvania
- Cincideutsch Christkindlmarkt – Cincinnati, Ohio
- Columbus Circle Holiday Market – Columbus Circle, New York City
- Downtown Holiday Market – Washington, D.C.
- European Christmas Market – St. Paul, Minnesota
- German Christmas Market of Oconomowoc – Oconomowoc, Wisconsin
- Germania Society Christkindlmarkt – Cincinnati, Ohio
- Holiday Shops – Bryant Park, New York City
- Kerstmarkt - Holland, Michigan
- Old World Christmas Market – Nashua, New Hampshire
- Union Square Holiday Market – Union Square, Manhattan, New York City
- Weihnachtsmarkt – Harmony, Pennsylvania
- Weihnachtsmarkt – New Braunfels, Texas
- Weihnachtsmarkt – Sparta, New Jersey
- Yuletide Cheer Festival – Blissfield, Michigan

=== Asia ===
==== Azerbaijan ====
- Fountains Square Christmas Market – Fountains Square, Baku

==== China ====
- Shanghai German Christmas Market – Shanghai

==== Japan ====
- Weihnachtsmarkt – Osaka
- Munich Christmas Market – Sapporo
- Tokyo Christmas Market – Tokyo
- Red Brick Warehouse Christmas Market – Yokohama

==== Syria ====
- Christmas Market – Aleppo, Syria

==== Taiwan ====
- Taipei German Christmas Market – Taipei
- Taipei European Christmas Market – Taipei

=== Oceania ===
==== New Zealand ====
- German Mid-Winter Christmas – Christchurch
