= The Christmas Village in Philadelphia =

Christmas market in Philadelphia, United States

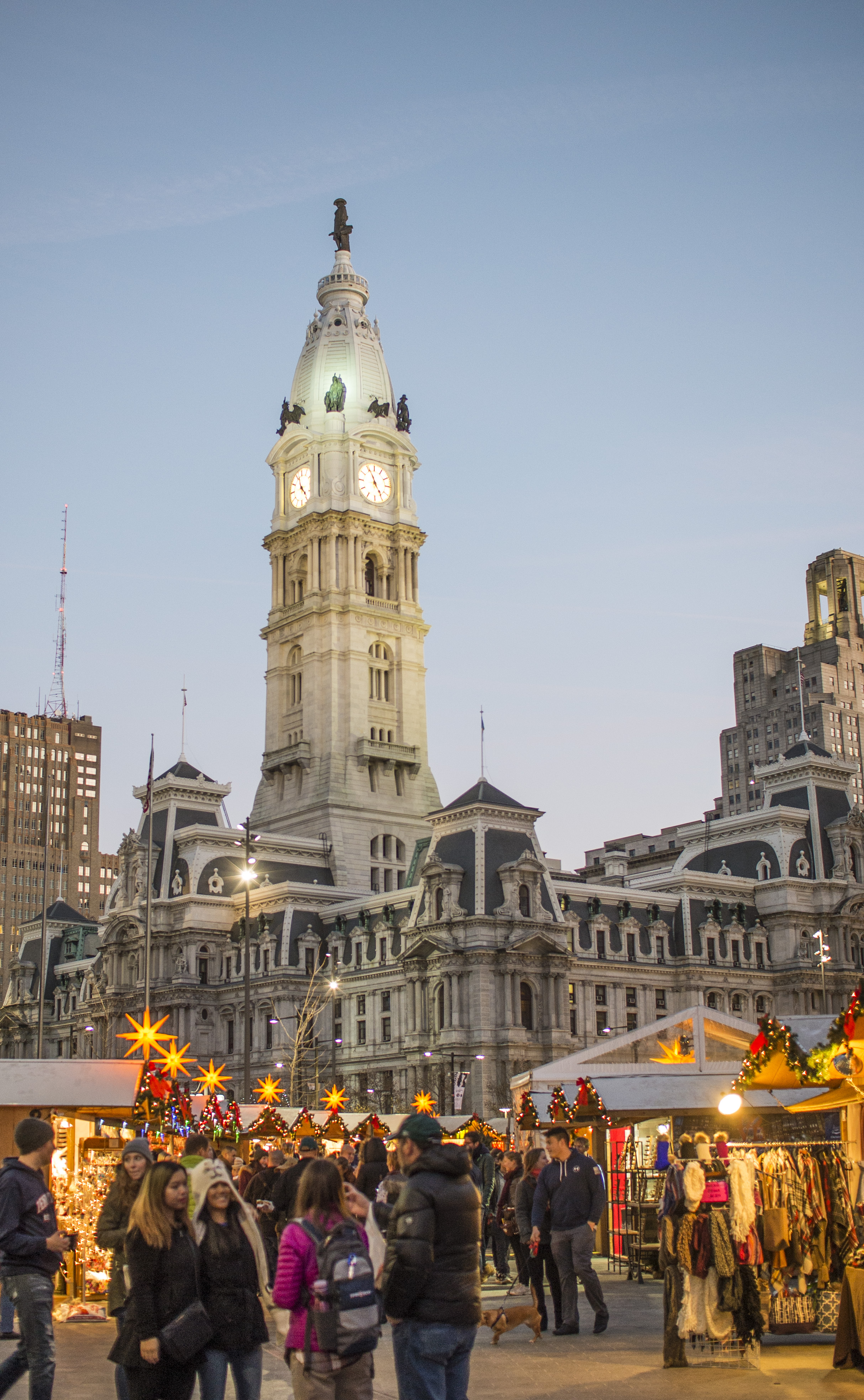
- Christmas Village in Philadelphia in LOVE Park facing City Hall
- Dates: November 18 – December 24, 2023
- Frequency: Annually
- Location: LOVE Park (2011–15, 2017–present) City Hall (2008–10, 2016)
- Years active: 2008–present
- Major events: More than 120 vendor booths: Käthe Wohlfahrt Tent; Daily Performances; City of Philadelphia Christmas Tree; Santa's House; European Food Specialties (bratwursts, crepes, lebkuchen, stollen, gluehwein, etc.)
- Website: www.philachristmas.com
- Hours; Sunday-Thursday: 12pm to 8pm; Friday-Saturday: 12pm to 9pm; Thanksgiving Day: 9am to 5pm; Christmas Eve: 12pm to 5pm; Social Media; Facebook; Instagram; TikTok

The Christmas Village in Philadelphia is an annual outdoor Christmas market event in LOVE Park, at which vendors in wooden booths and a vendor tent sell international seasonal holiday gifts, ornaments, arts, and crafts, as well as European food, sweets, and hot beverages.

The Christmas Village was formerly held at City Hall, since LOVE Park was under construction. In 2017, Christmas Village returned to the newly renovated LOVE Park and turned it into an authentic German Christmas market. The 2023 event was open from November 18 – December 24, 2023.

== About ==
The Christmas Village in Philadelphia is modeled in the style of traditional German Christmas Markets. Christmas Market events such as the famous Christkindlesmarkt in Nuremberg, which dates back to the 16th century, are part of a long tradition of farmers' markets in Germany's inner cities.

Several wooden booths and tents sell food specialties such as German bratwursts with sauerkraut, schnitzel, goulash, and Bavarian pretzels. A wide assortment of traditional sweet Christmas-food items like lebkuchen (gingerbread cookies), stollen, spekulatius, roasted nuts, cotton candy, chocolate covered fruits, waffles, and crepes are offered. In addition to hot drinks such as hot chocolate, coffee, and tea, Christmas Village offers Glühwein (mulled wine).

Besides local vendors and artists there are German vendors selling genuine Christmas decorations, pewter ornaments, candles, nativity sets, glass ornaments, toys, woollens, wooden ornaments, lace, spices, and jewelry. The booths' assortment is related to the winter season and the upcoming holidays.

Highlights of the event include live performances from local artists such as string and brass bands, soloists, and school choirs at a central stage, and an opening ceremony with the original Christkind from Christkindlesmarkt Nuremberg, the City of Philadelphia's Christmas Tree Lighting Ceremony and a German American weekend. For children there is a Santa's house and more special themed events such as story time. For adults Christmas Village offers weekly wine and spirits tastings.

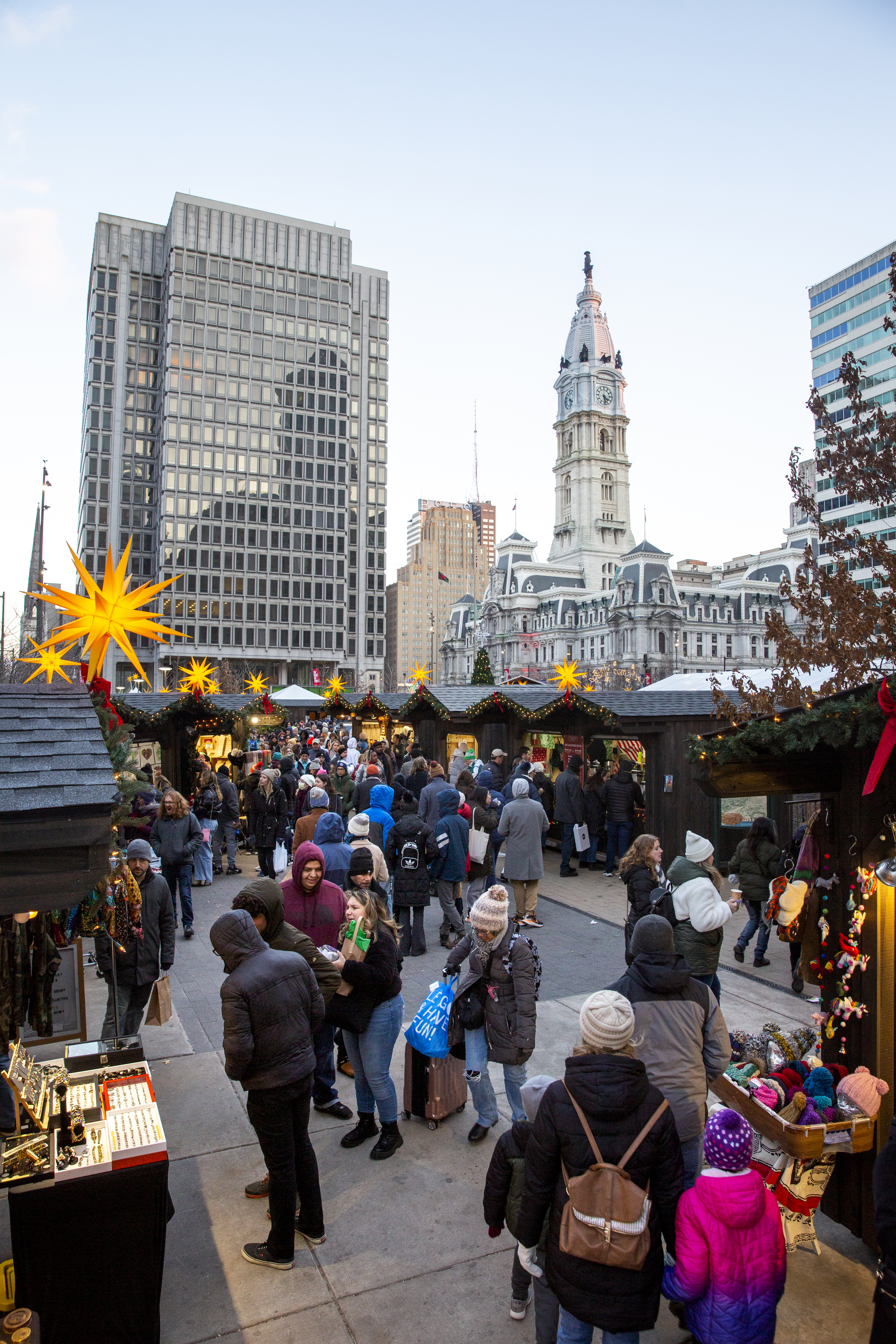
Shoppers at Christmas Village in Philadelphia in LOVE Park

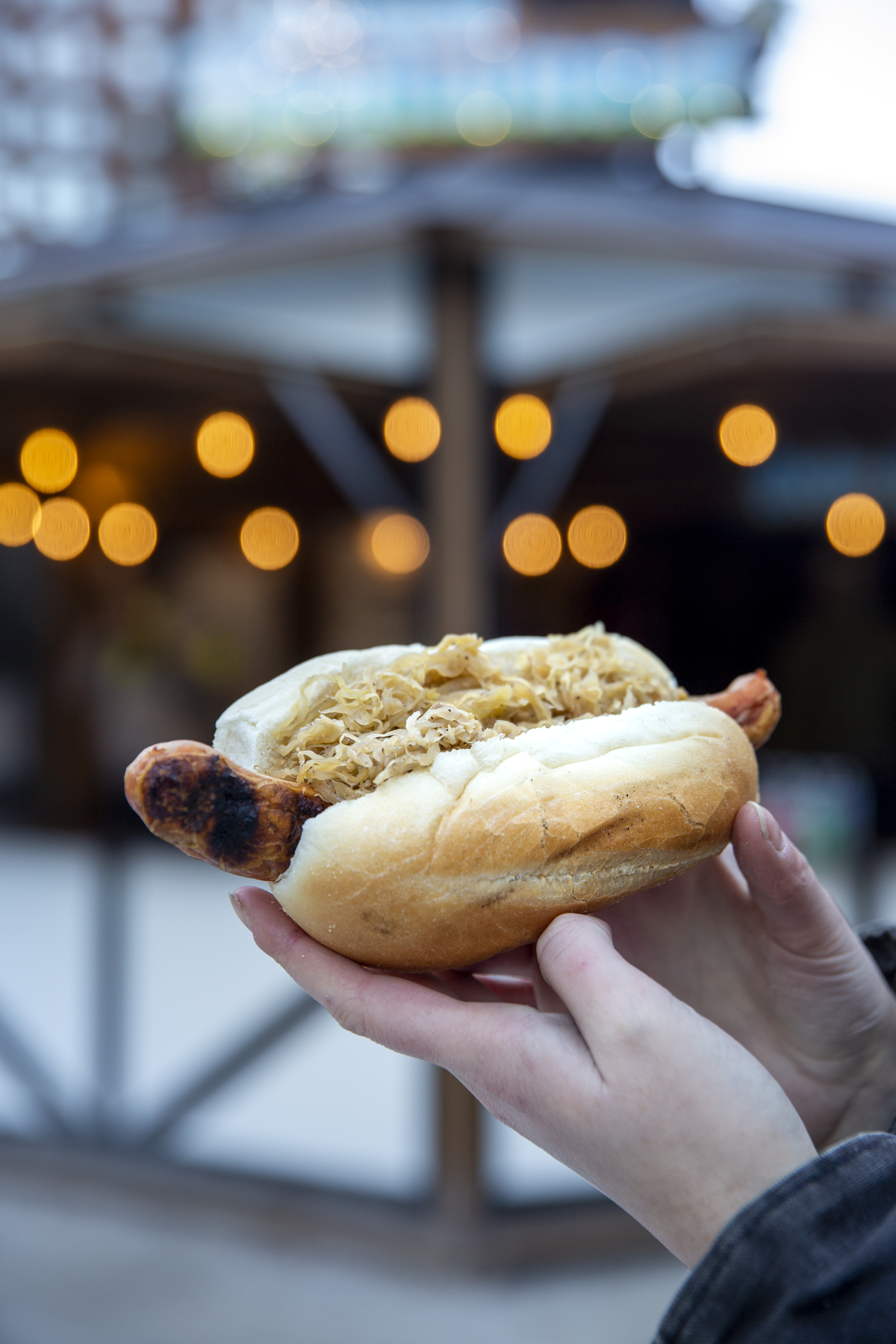
German Bratwurst at Christmas Village in Philadelphia in LOVE Park

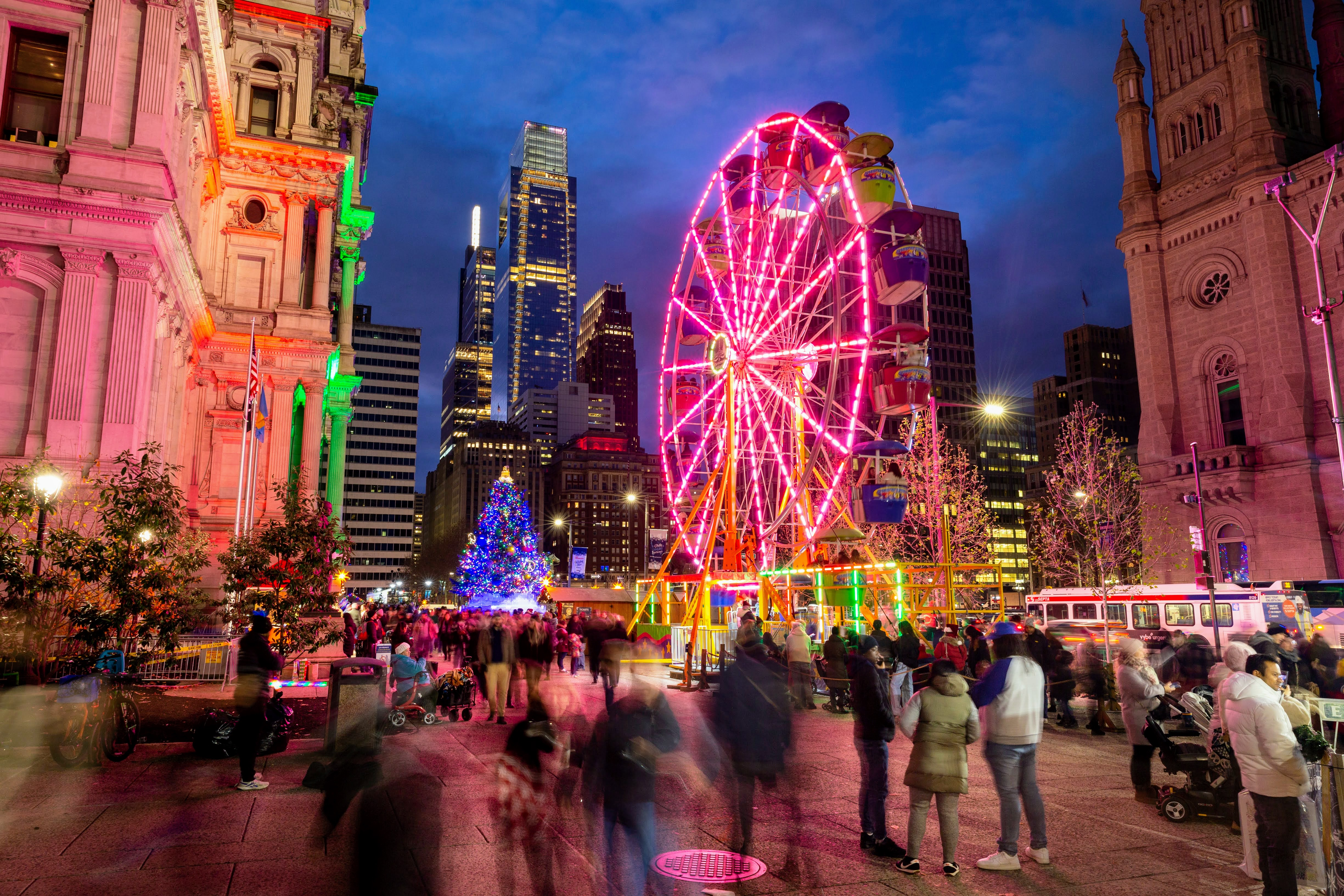
Ferris Wheel at Christmas Village in Philadelphia

== Name controversy ==
In 2010, Christmas Village in Philadelphia was subject to a major controversy about its name. After City Officials proposed to change its name and its portal signs to “Holiday Village”, the controversy became a national news topic. Jay Leno scoffed: “The annual ‘Christmas Village’ in Philadelphia has been renamed the ‘Holiday Village.’ In fact, they’re not Santa’s reindeer anymore . . . They’re now ‘nondenominational venison.’” After three days of controversy Philadelphia’s Mayor Michael A. Nutter intervened and the name and signs were restored.

== See also ==
- List of Christmas markets
- Christmas market
