= Dortmund Christmas Market =

Annual tradition in Dortmund, Germany

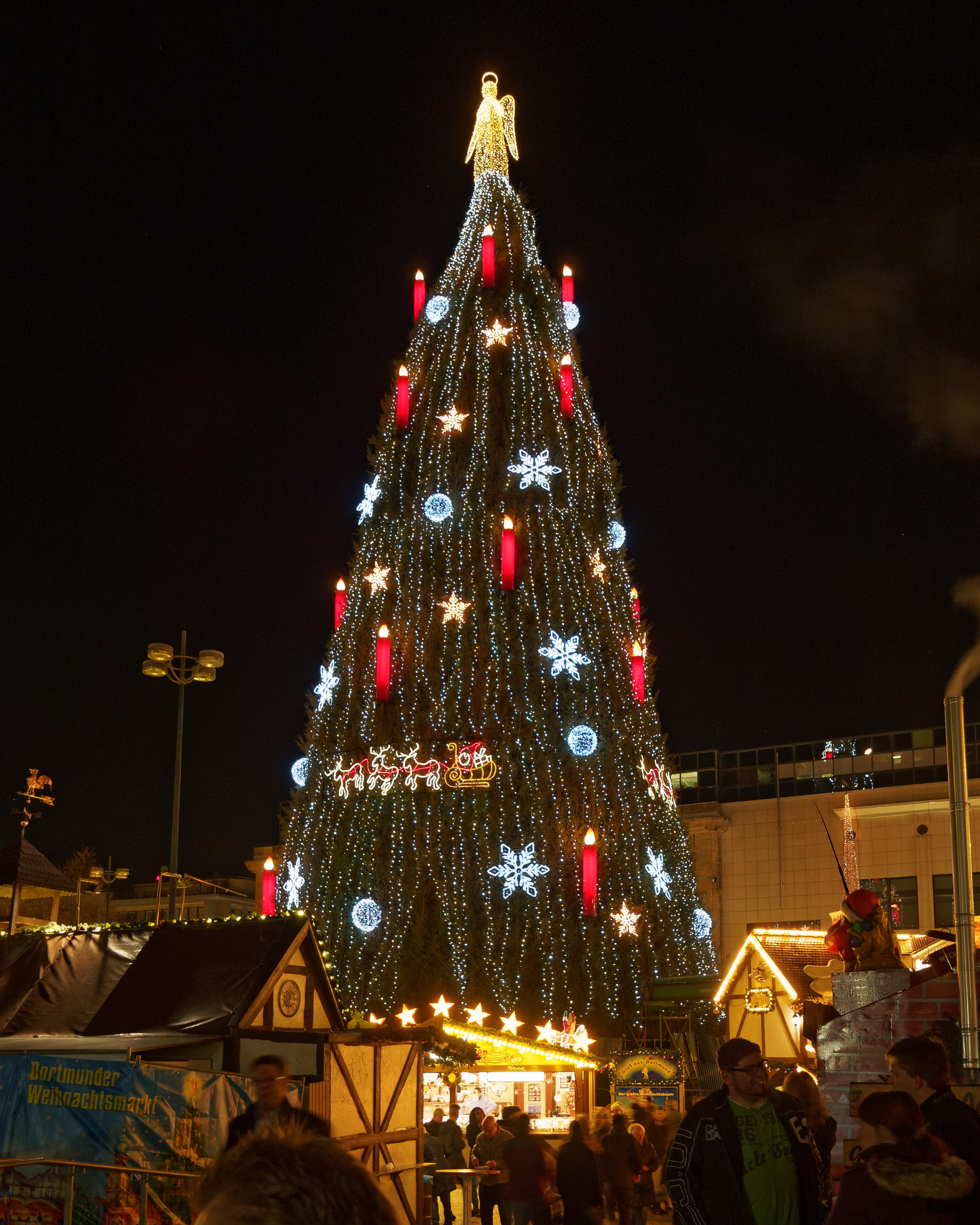
Christmas Tree at Hansaplatz

The Dortmund Christmas Market (German: Dortmunder Weihnachtsmarkt) is an annual outdoor Christmas market in central Dortmund, North Rhine-Westphalia, Germany. With more than three and a half million visitors and 300 stalls, it's among the largest Christmas markets in Germany. It is estimated that the city earns a profit of €100 million from this 38-day-long market.

The Christmas tree at the Dortmund Christmas Market is promoted as one of the largest natural Christmas trees, measuring over 45 meters tall.

== History ==
The market's origins date back to 1878. There were no markets between 1939 and 1948. In recent years, the Dortmund Christmas Market has become the largest Christmas market in Germany, receiving well over 3.5 million visitors annually.

The Christmas market opens in late November and continues until just before New Year's Eve (usually 30 December). It occupies a large area in central Dortmund, including Alter Markt around St. Reinold's Church, Hansaplatz, Kleppingstraße, and Westenhellweg.

=== Recent Events ===
In 2024, the Dortmund Christmas Market garnered international attention when visitors noticed that mulled wine was being served in mugs originally designed for Luxembourg’s Christmas market. These mugs featured slogans and imagery promoting Luxembourg, such as the Passerelle bridge. The mix-up occurred due to an error by Mohaba, the company responsible for producing the cups. While the mistake initially caused confusion, it unexpectedly sparked a collecting craze amongst visitors.

== Vendors and attractions ==
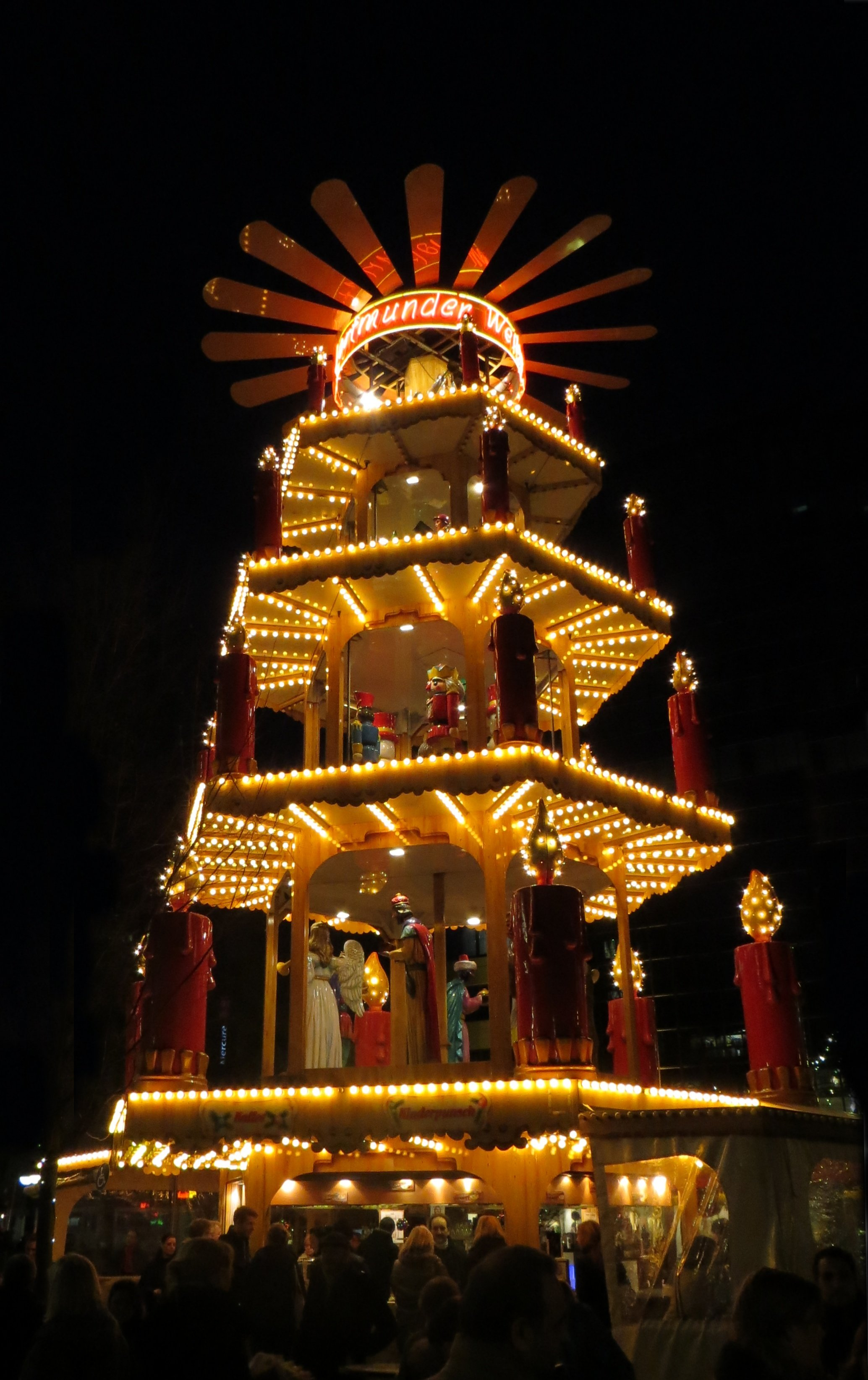
Christmas pyramid

A key attraction of the Dortmund Christmas Market is the Christmas tree, which has become a central feature of the event. It stands more than 45 meters (147.64 ft.) tall. The tree is made of 1,700 spruce trees from Sauerland. 20 large candles and 48,000 lights decorate the Christmas tree, the top of which is decorated with a four-meter (13.12ft) angel. The total weight of this structure is 40 tons. The tree assembly process traditionally begins in late October, marked by a public event at Hansaplatz. The tree is typically assembled over the course of four weeks, using red spruce trees sourced from Sauerland.

Christmas Village

Situated in the Dortmund Christmas Market is a children's adventure world called Weihnachtsdorf (English: 'Christmas Village'). The Christmas Village offers various activities for children, including reading poems aloud, singing songs, participating in crafts, and baking. The village also features a puppet theatre, a merry-go-round, and a Santa chair where a fairy tale show is performed.
Candle pyramids (Christmas pyramid)
In many parts of Germany, the candle pyramid is brought out every year to light up the room at Christmas. Two to five round wooden tiers, gradually smaller towards the top, are built onto a central rod that rotates, driven by the heat of candles rising up into a rotor at the top. The whole ornament is usually about 50cm (1.64ft) high, but one of the tallest pyramid in the world takes pride of place at the Dortmund Christmas Market, towering a full 12m (39.37ft) in the air. Originally, the pyramid was a much simpler affair, simply a frame to hang sprigs of fir upon; the modern-day pyramid did not evolve until the early 19th century.
Alter Markt Stage
The "Alter Markt" stage presents a program every day. On 8 December, the popular WDR 4 'Christmas' show features international stars.

== Food and drinks ==
- Glühwein (mulled wine)

One tradition in Dortmund is drinking mugs of mulled wine at the Weihnachtsmarkt. This is hot red wine spiced with cloves and cinnamon, served in specially decorated mugs. The mugs feature a different design every year and have become a collector's item.

- Glühbier (mulled beer)

An evolution of Dortmund brewing tradition, mulled beer is a hot beer with honey, brown sugar and winter spices – such as star anise, cinnamon and cardamom.

- Reibekuchen (potato fritters)

Reibekuchen may be served with applesauce, pumpernickel bread, treacle, or with Maggi-brand seasoning sauce. They are often sold at street fairs and markets, such as Christmas markets in Germany.

- Dortmunder Salzkuchen (Saltcake)

'Dortmunder Salzkuchen', a traditional dish in the region, consists of bread buns flavored with caraway, salt, and topped with meat and onions.

== Medieval Christmas Market Fredenbaum ==
The Medieval Christmas Market at Fredenbaum is part of the larger Dortmund Christmas Market in Germany. It features traditional crafts, food, and entertainment with a medieval theme. Dortmund hosts three Christmas markets, each including souvenir stalls, a carousel, a Nativity scene, and a decorated tree. The Fredenbaumpark market, located in the northern part of downtown, is the largest medieval Christmas market in Europe and takes place every weekend starting on 23 November.

== See also ==
- List of Christmas markets
