= Christkindlmarket, Chicago =

Christmas market in Illinois, US

Coordinates: 41.88393°N 87.63020°W

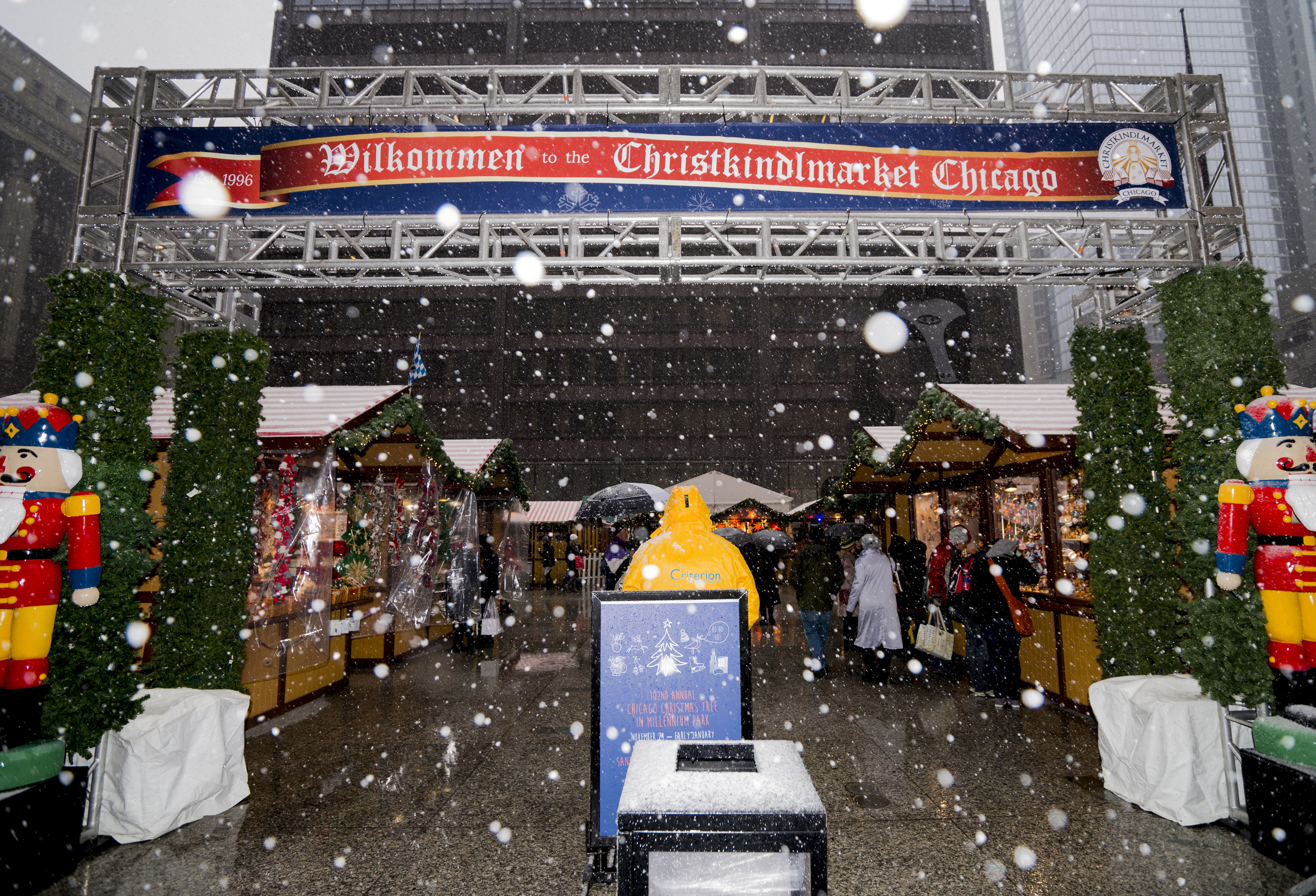
- Date: Varies
- Begins: Friday before Thanksgiving Day
- Ends: Christmas Eve
- Locations: Chicago, United States
- Inaugurated: 1996
- Most recent: 2024

Christkindlmarket is a Christmas market held annually at Daley Plaza in Chicago, Illinois, United States. The festival attracts more than 1 million visitors each year.

== History ==
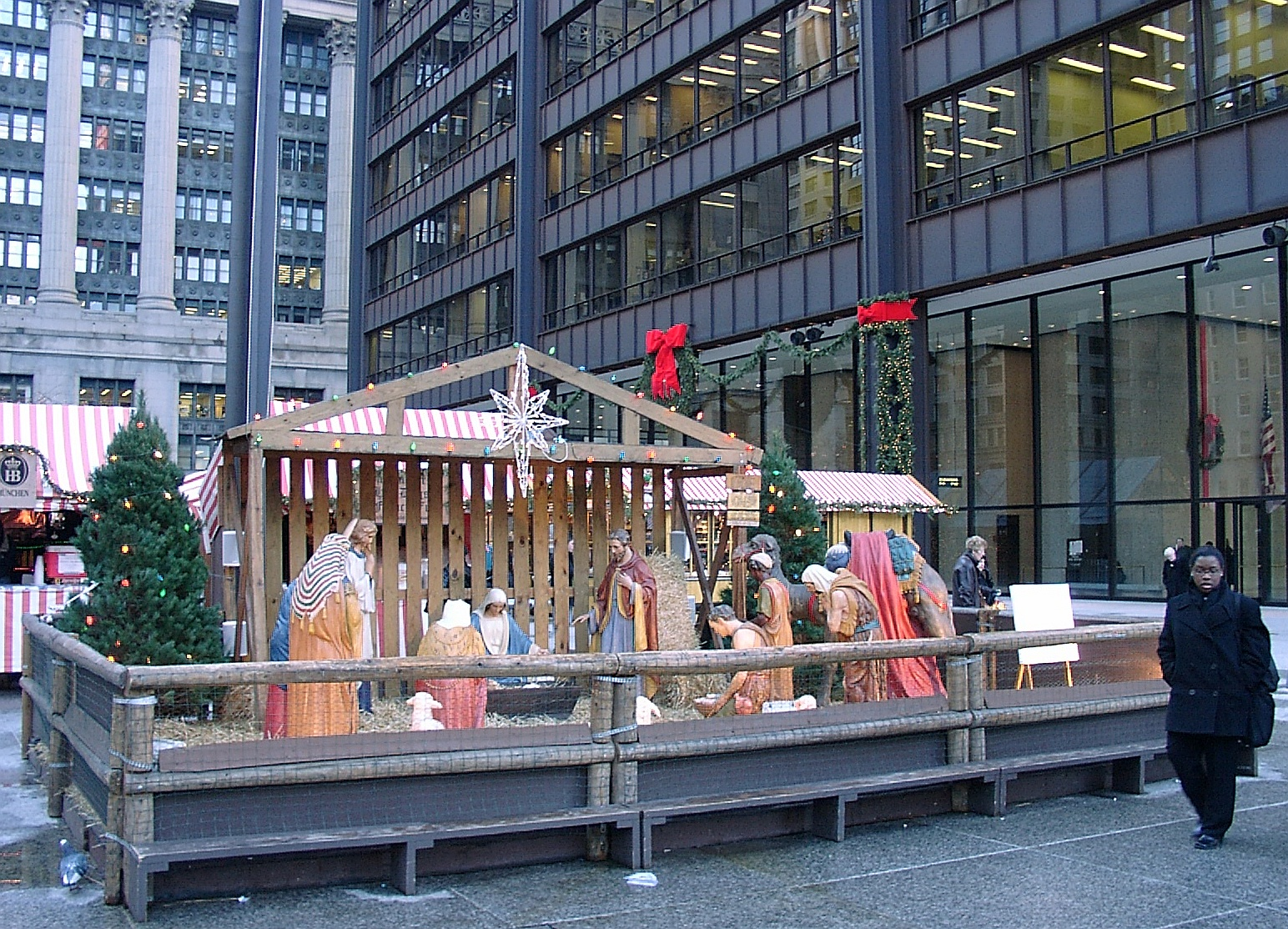
A nativity scene in the market in 2001

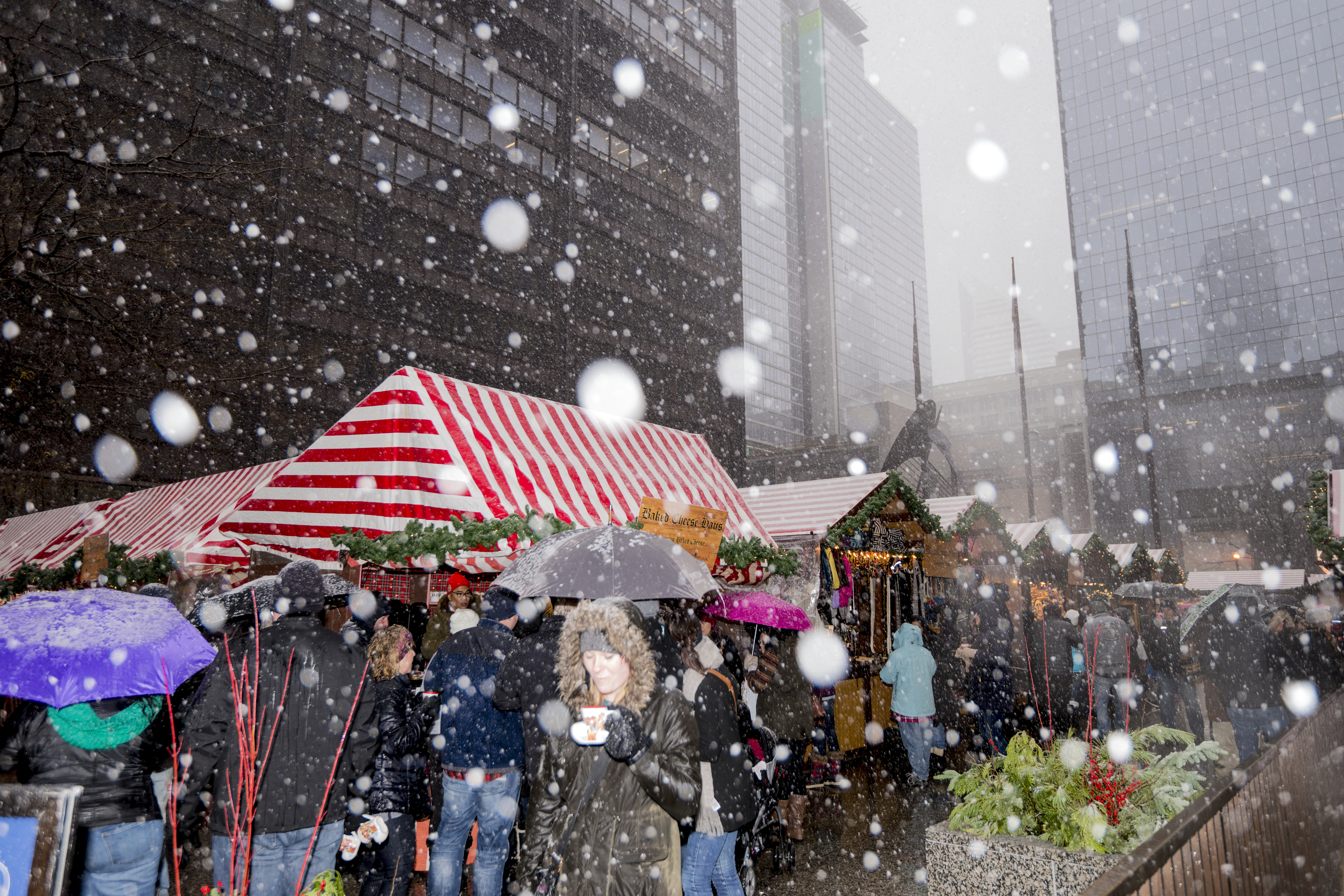
The market in 2015.

The German American Chamber of Commerce of the Midwest first held Chicago's Christkindlmarket on Pioneer Court in 1996. Christkindlmarket was inspired by the Christkindlesmarkt in Nuremberg, Germany. In 1997, Mayor Richard M. Daley requested that the festival be moved to Daley Plaza. That year, the market attracted more than 750,000 visitors. By 1999, the Christkindlmarket had become part of the Magnificent Mile Lights Festival. In recent years, Chicago's Christkindlmarket has become the largest Christmas market in the United States, hosting well over 1 million visitors annually. In 2016, Christkindlmarket expanded to the Chicago suburb of Naperville. Four years later, a virtual market took place. In 2023, the Christkindlmarket also took place in Aurora, Illinois, and Wrigleyville. That year, they ran out of mugs.

== Vendors and attractions ==
Christkindlmarket, Chicago 2014

The market is situated by a large Christmas tree at Daley Plaza and also houses a small nativity scene. The site features entertainment from Christmas choirs, dance groups, and brass bands. It also houses a Santa house. At the site beer, wine, baked goods, meats, toys, holiday ornaments, and other Christmas decorations are sold by vendors from Germany, Ukraine, Austria, and the Chicago metropolitan area.

== See also ==
- List of Christmas markets
- Christmas market
- Germans in Chicago
