= Westenhellweg =

Street in Dortmund, Germany

Coordinates: 51.5144°N 7.4608°E

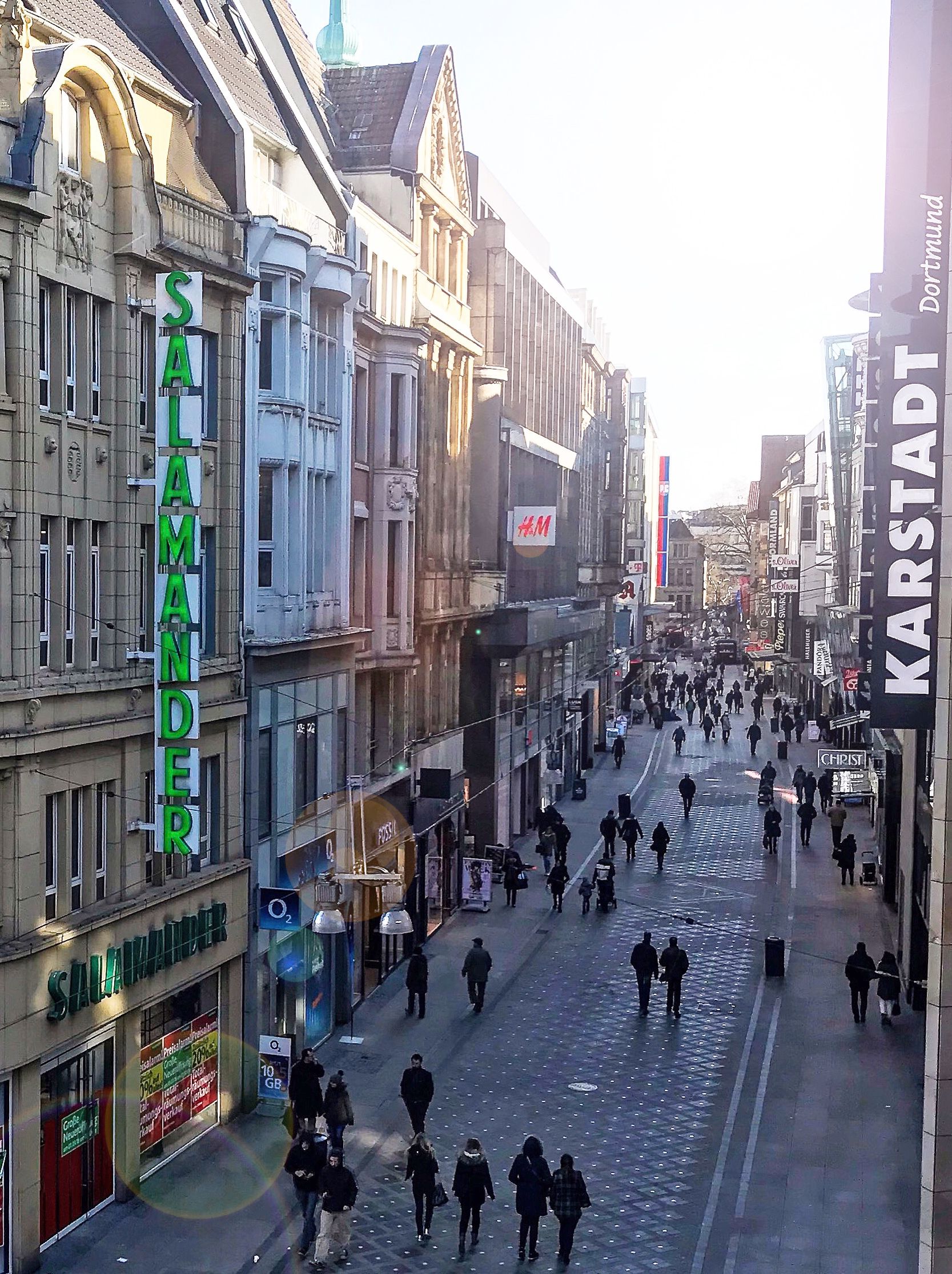
Shopping street Westenhellweg

Westenhellweg is the main shopping street in Dortmund, Germany. With nearly 13,000 visitors per hour it was Germany's most frequented shopping street in 2013.
