= Winchester Cathedral Christmas Market =

Annual market in Hampshire, England

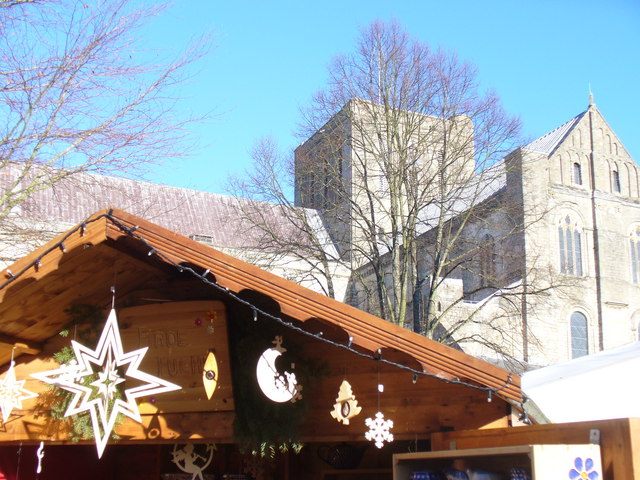
- Stall at the market, with cathedral behind
- Status: Active
- Genre: Christmas market
- Dates: November/December
- Frequency: Annual
- Locations: Winchester, Hampshire
- Country: U.K.
- Established: 2006

Winchester Cathedral Christmas Market is a Christmas market held each year in the grounds of Winchester Cathedral, in the city of Winchester in the English county of Hampshire. Typically the market operates from the middle of November until a few days before Christmas Day.

The market was founded in 2006, and has operated every year since with the exception of 2020, when it was cancelled due to the coronavirus pandemic.

The market hosts around 120 German-inspired chalets, selling a range of art and craft items, seasonal gifts, food and drink. Originally these were complemented by an outdoor ice rink, but from 2021 that was replaced by a performance stage that hosts a variety of performances.

Access to the market is free of charge and booking is not required, but queues may develop at busy times.
