= Christkindlesmarkt, Nuremberg =

Annual Christmas market in Nuremberg, Bavaria, Germany

Christkindlesmarket of Nuremberg Nürnberger Christkindlesmarkt
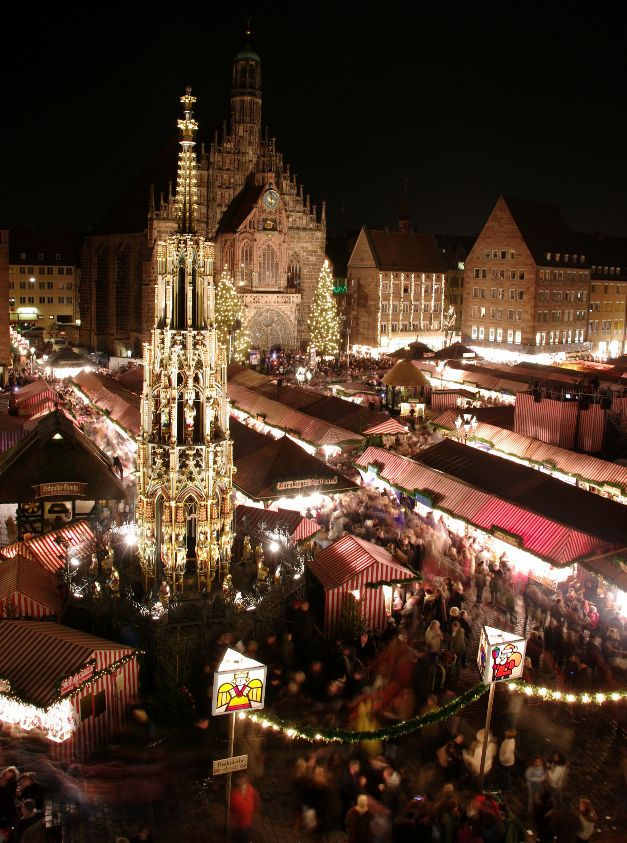
- Genre: Christmas market
- Date: Friday preceding the first December Sunday–24 December
- Locations: Hauptmarkt, Nuremberg
- Coordinates: 49°27′14″N 11°04′38″E
- Country: Bavaria, Germany
- Years active: 1610 or 1639–present
- Inaugurated: unknown
- Attendance: ca. 2 million
- Website: christkindlesmarkt.de

The Christkindlesmarkt of Nuremberg (German: Nürnberger Christkindlesmarkt) is a Christmas market that is held annually in Nuremberg, Germany. It takes place during Advent in the Hauptmarkt, the central square in Nuremberg’s old town, and in adjoining squares and streets. With about two million visitors a year the Nürnberger Christkindlesmarkt is one of the largest Christmas markets in Germany and one of the most famous in the world. Every year the Christmas market begins on the Friday preceding the first Sunday in Advent and ends on Christmas Eve unless that day is a Sunday.

== History ==
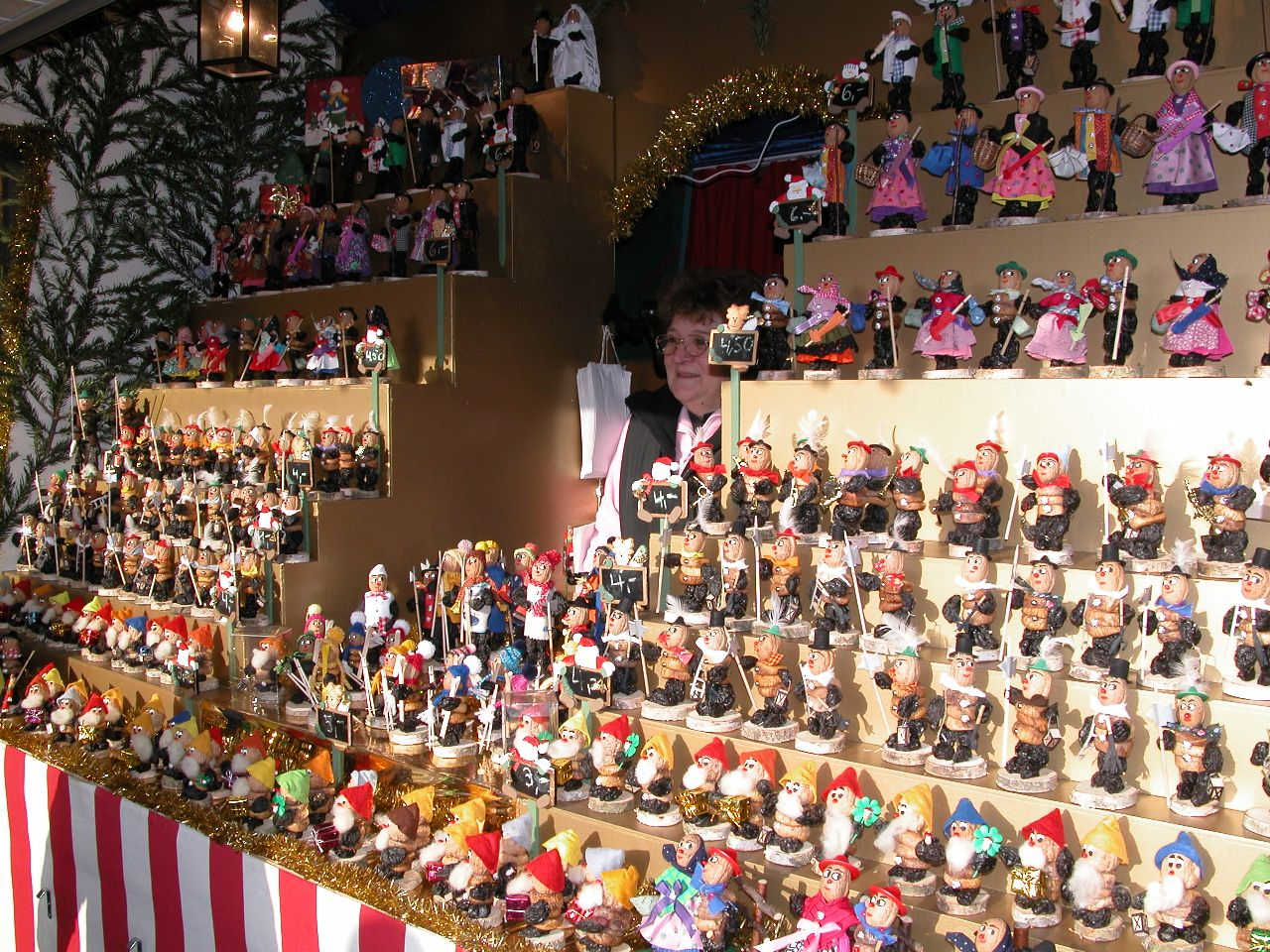
Zwetschgenmännla and zwetschgenweibla fruit dolls at the Nuremberg Christkindlesmarkt

Despite intense investigations carried out by several historians and people interested in local history, the origins of the Nürnberger Christkindlesmarkt are unknown. The oldest piece of evidence relating to it is a box made of coniferous wood in the possession of the Germanic National Museum in Nuremberg. On the bottom can be found the inscription: Regina Susanna Harßdörfferin von der Jungfrau Susanna Eleonora Erbsin (oder Elbsin) zum Kindles-Marck überschickt 1628 ("Regina Susanna Harßdörfferin from the virgin Susanna Eleonora Erbsin (or Elbsin) sent to the Kindles-Marck in 1628").

In official documents, the words Kindleinbescheren ("handing out Christmas presents to children") or Weihnachtszeit (Christmas tide) are used from 1610 onwards. It is not clear, however, whether these words have anything to do with the Christkindlesmarkt. Historians assume that the market has its origins in traditional sales at the weekly market between 1610 and 1639 and that it gradually evolved into an independent market. Originally, the market opened on the Feast of Saint Barbara (4 December). Due to the large number of visitors, the opening was brought forward to the Friday before the First Sunday of Advent in 1973 and has remained so ever since. There were no markets between 1939 and 1948.

== Location ==
The original location of the Christkindlesmarkt was the Nuremberg Hauptmarkt. It was, however, relocated to other places such as the Fleischbrücke or the island Schütt between 1898 and 1933. In 1933, the market returned to its original venue in front of the Frauenkirche.

== Christkind ==
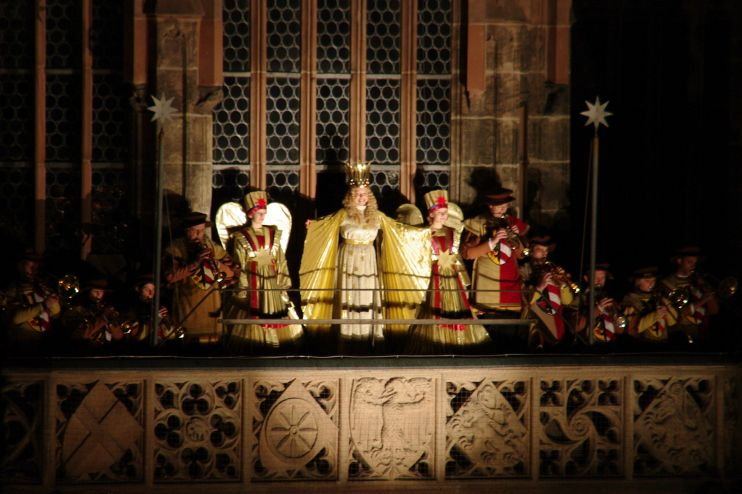
Opening speech by the Christkind (2009)

Christkindlesmarkt could be translated literally as "Christ Child Market". The Nuremberg Christkind, or Christ Child, a young woman dressed in white and gold, with curly blond hair, a tall golden crown and angel-wing-like long golden sleeves, is an important part of the market. Initially impersonated by an actress, since 1969 the Christkind has been elected every second year among local girls between 16 and 19 years of age. A large number of competitors enter via the Internet, finally, a jury chooses the next Christkind out of several finalists who have to be at least 1,60m tall and free from giddiness as the Christkind has to make her speech from the church balcony, secured with a rope, possibly in inclement winter weather. Besides the opening speech on every Friday evening, the Christkind appears in schools, hospitals etc. In 2015 Barbara Otto succeeded Teresa Treuheit.

=== Prologue ===
The Christkindlesmarket is opened with a prologue speech by the Christkind from the balcony of the Frauenkirche church. This solemn event attracts thousands of people to the Hauptmarkt. The prologue, written by Friedrich Bröger for the first post-war market in 1948, was modified several times since as the largely destroyed city was rebuilt and the hungry population became prosperous again. It begins, and ends, with an invitation to "the ladies and gentlemen who have been children once" and to "the little ones at the beginning of the journey of life", and compares short-term events like the temporary market "little city made of wood and cloth" to timeless values, memories and traditions.

== Sister city market ==
In Rathausplatz the sister city market has taken place since 1998. The sister cities provide booths with local specialties. These cities are: Antalya (Turkey), Atlanta (USA), Vienna (Austria), Kharkiv (Ukraine), Gera (Germany), Glasgow (Scotland), Kavala (Greece), Kraków (Poland), Nice (France), Prague (Czech Republic), San Carlos (Nicaragua), Shenzhen (China), Skopje (North Macedonia), Venice (Italy) and Limousin (France). Moreover, there are friend cities like Bar (Montenegro), Kalkudah (Sri Lanka), Verona (Italy) present at the market.

== See also ==
- List of Christmas markets
