= Christmas market =

Type of street market

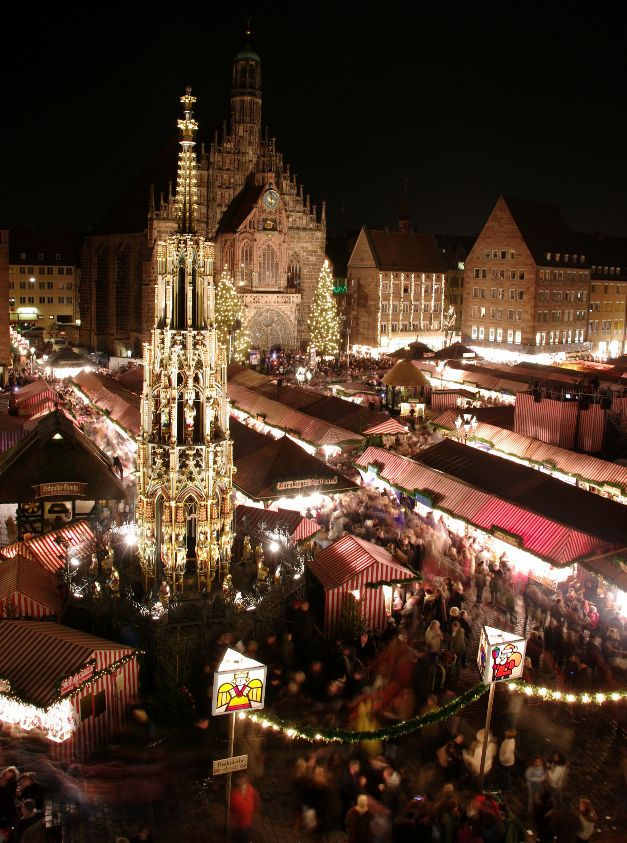
The Christkindlesmarkt in Nuremberg, Germany, one of the world's most famous Christmas markets

A Christmas market (Note: Known in German as Christkindlmarkt (literally: 'Christ Child Market', though the term Christkind usually refers to an angel-like 'spirit of Christmas', rather than literally to the Christ Child), Christkindlesmarkt, Christkindlimarkt, and Weihnachtsmarkt (pronounced [ˈvaɪnaxtsˌmaʁkt]).) is a street market associated with the celebration of Christmas during the four weeks of Advent. These markets originated in Germany, but are now held in many countries. Some in the U.S. have adapted the German name to quasi-English Christkindlmarket, swapping German Markt and market.

Christmas markets date to the Late Middle Ages in the German-speaking part of Europe and in many parts of the former Holy Roman Empire, which included many eastern regions of modern France. They became a popular Advent custom during the Reformation era. Dresden's Striezelmarkt was first held in 1434 and one of the first true Christmas markets; earlier markets of the season were "December markets". Early mentions of these "December markets" can be found in Vienna (1298), Munich (1310), Bautzen (1384), and Frankfurt (1393).

In many towns of Germany, Switzerland, and Austria, Advent is usually ushered in with the opening of the Christmas market or Weihnachtsmarkt. In southern Germany, Switzerland and Austria, it is called a Christkind(e)l(s)(i)markt (German language, literally meaning "Christ child market"). Traditionally held in the town square, the market offers food, drinks and seasonal items for sale from open-air stalls, accompanied by traditional singing and dancing. On opening night at the Christkindlesmarkt in Nuremberg, and in some other towns, onlookers welcome the Christkind (originally boy Jesus, but often depicted as an angel-like girl), acted by a local child.

== History ==
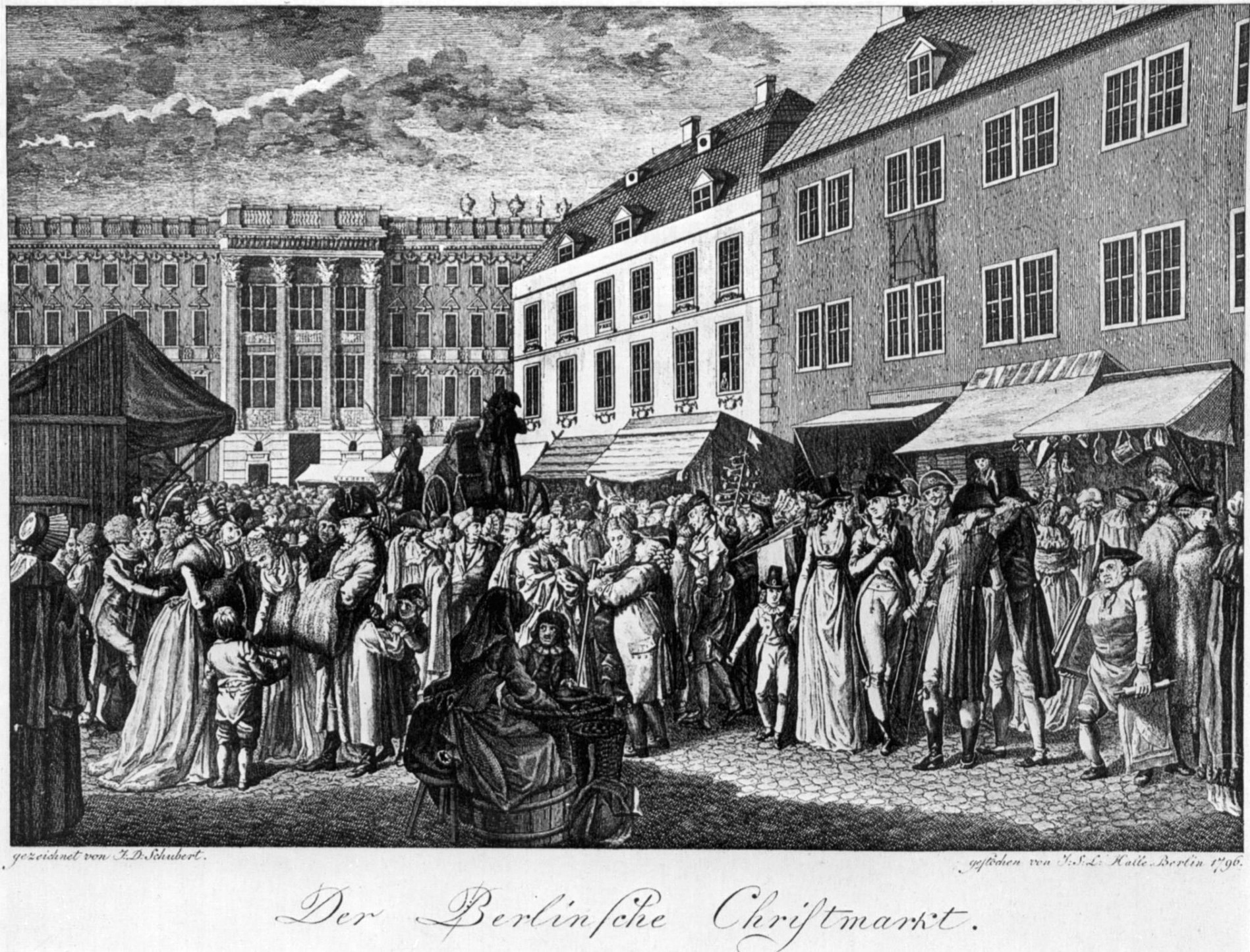
Engraving of the Christmas market at the City Palace in Berlin, Germany, 1796

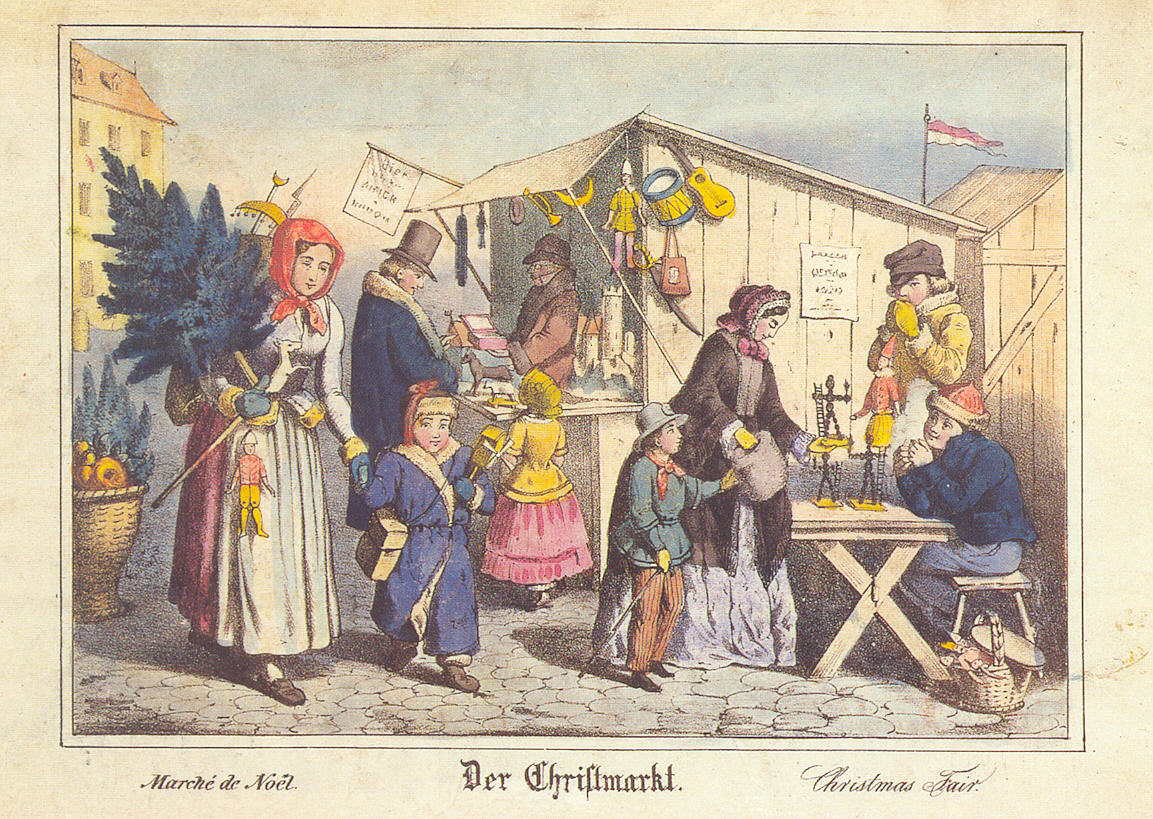
Litography of the Christmas market in Nuremberg, Germany, in the 19th century

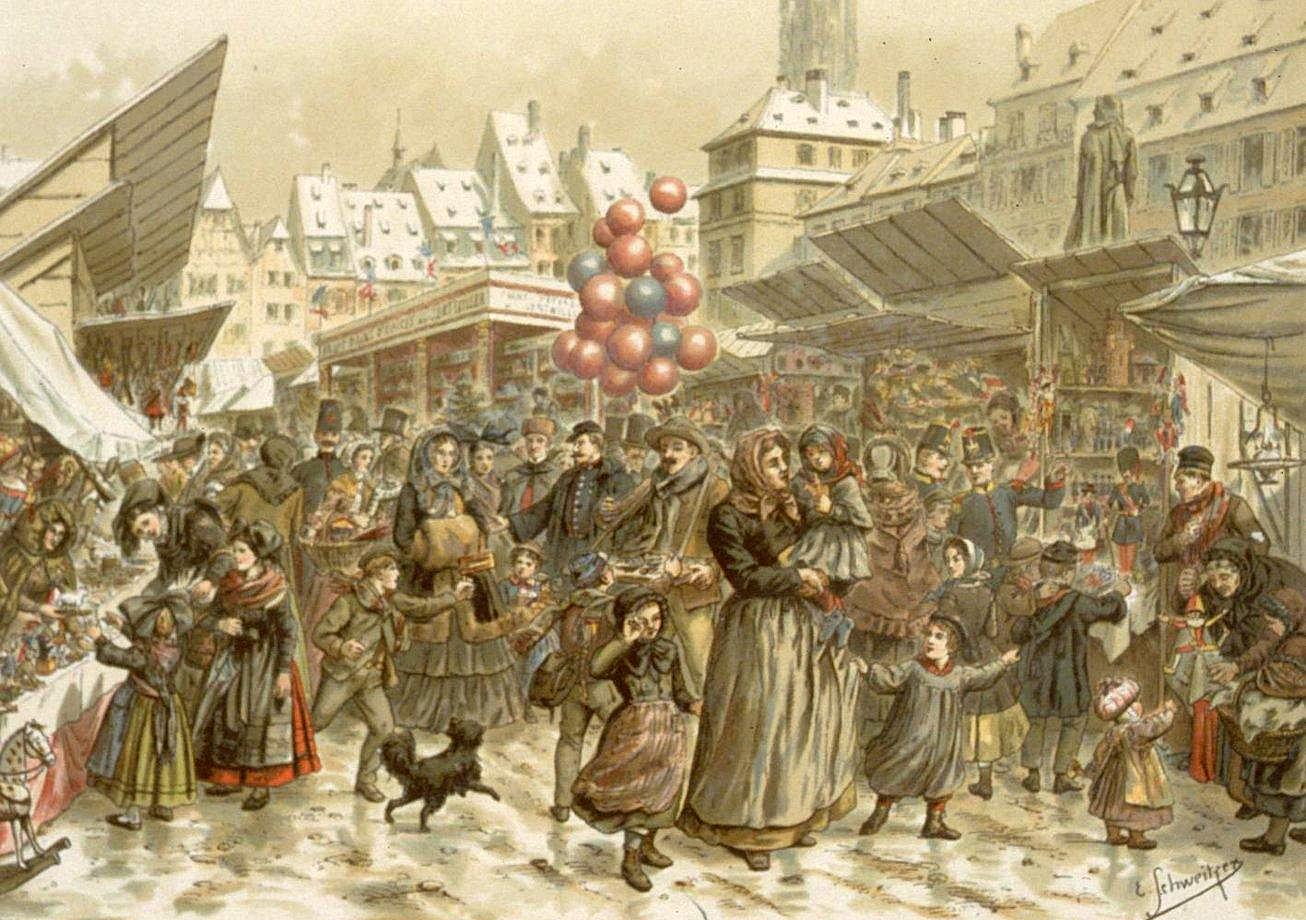
Depiction of the Christmas market on the Place Kléber in Strasbourg, France, 1859

=== Origins and medieval times ===
The first traces of Christmas markets in the German-speaking part of Europe and in many parts of the former Holy Roman Empire go back to late medieval sales fairs and—often one-day—markets, which gave citizens the opportunity to stock up on meat and winter necessities at the beginning of the cold season. In 1296, Duke Albert I of Austria granted the Viennese traders the privilege of holding a "December market" to supply the local population.

In the 14th century, the custom arose of allowing craftsmen such as toy makers, basket weavers and confectioners to set up stalls under the name "Saint Nicholas market" to sell the little things that children received as Christmas gifts. There were also stands selling roasted chestnuts, nuts and almonds. A Saint Nicholas market in Munich was first mentioned in a document in 1310. In 1384, King Wenceslas granted the town of Bautzen the right to hold a free meat market on Saturdays from St. Michael's Day (29 September) until Christmas.

Over time, the tradition spread throughout the German-speaking world. The first document reporting a Christmas market is dated 1434 during the reign of Frederick II of Saxony, mentioning a Striezelmarkt, which took place in Dresden on the Monday before Christmas. Later, the Reformation continued the tradition by renaming it Christkindlmarkt ("Christ Child market") to combat the cult of saints. The Strasbourg Christmas market dates from 1570, that of Nuremberg from 1628.

=== Development and revival ===
In the 19th century, the Christkindelsmärik (in Alsatian) of Strasbourg was held at the Frohnhof (French: Cour aux Corvées) between the Cathedral of Our Lady, the Palais Rohan and the Œuvre Notre-Dame Museum (current Place du Château) and took place eight days before Christmas and until midnight mass.

Since around the first half of the 20th century, markets have become an integral element of pre-Christmas customs. A revival took place in the mid-1990s. Many cities in Europe have established their own Christmas market with chalets and sometimes attractions (ephemeral ice rink, Ferris wheel, etc.), thus offering a more commercial market.

=== Terrorism and safety ===
In the 21st century, Christmas markets in Western Europe have occasionally been the targets of terror attacks, with completed or thwarted attacks occurring in Dijon, Nantes, Berlin, Ludwigshafen, Potsdam, Vienna, Strasbourg, Magdeburg and Dingolfing. Christmas markets increasingly have security procedures such as bollards, uniformed and plainclothes police officers, and surveillance to protect visitors.

== Attractions and stalls ==
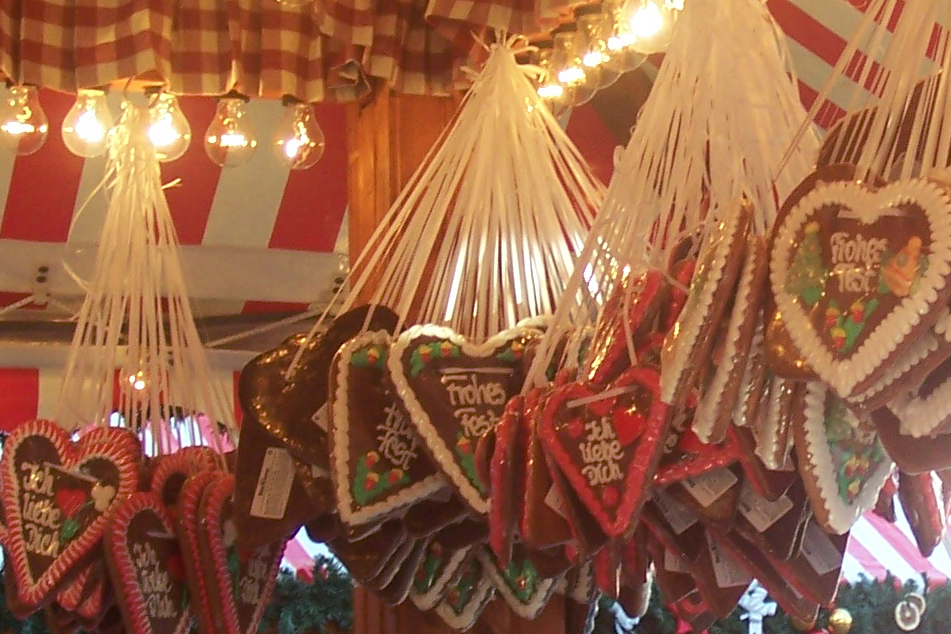
Traditional gingerbread hearts at a Christmas market in Berlin, Germany

Popular attractions at the markets include the Nativity Scene (a crèche or crib), Zwetschgenmännle (figures made of decorated dried plums), Nussknacker (carved Nutcrackers), Gebrannte Mandeln (candied, toasted almonds), traditional Christmas cookies such as Lebkuchen and Magenbrot (both forms of soft gingerbread), Bratwurst, and Glühwein, hot mulled wine (with or without a shot of brandy), or Eierpunsch (an egg-based warm alcoholic drink) – both a highlight of the market for many visitors. Both help stave off the cold winter air which sometimes dips below freezing. More regional food specialties include Christstollen (Stollen), a sort of bread with candied fruit in Saxony, and hot Apfelwein and Frankfurter Bethmännchen in Hesse.

== Major Christmas markets ==
=== Austria ===
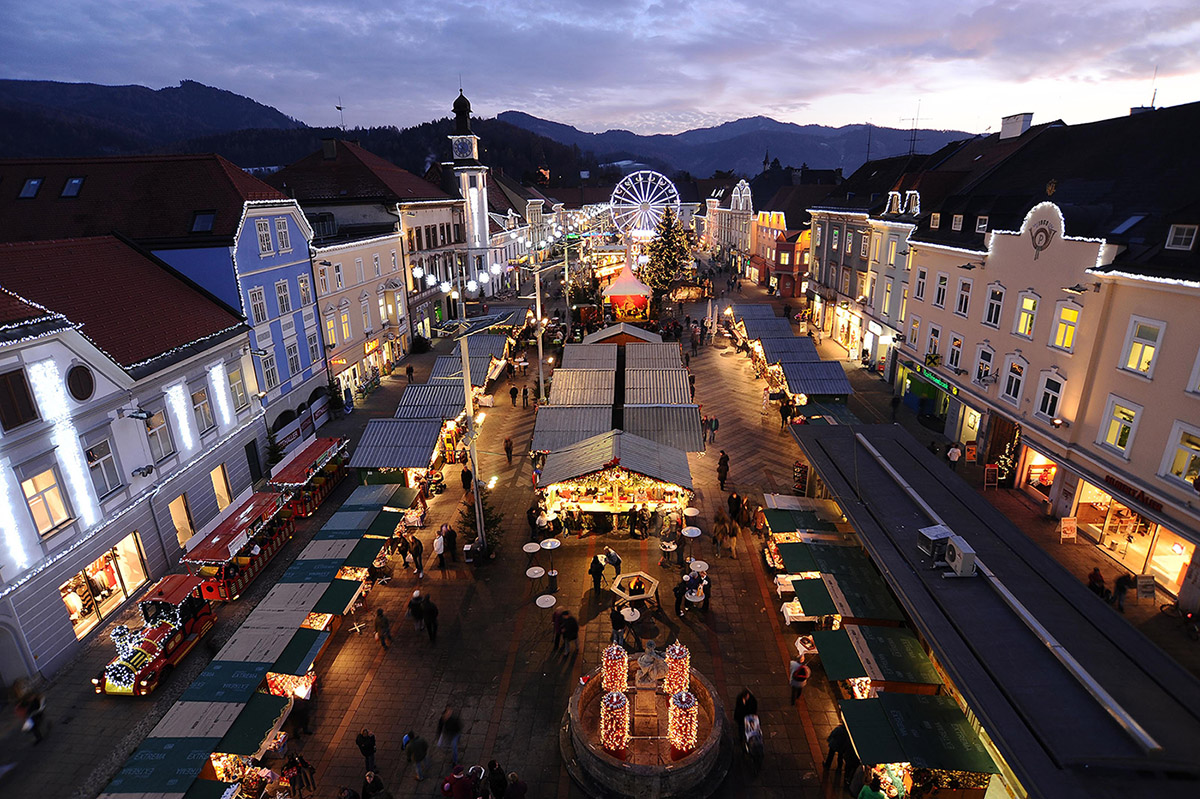
Advent and Christmas market in Leoben, Austria

Christmas markets are popular traditions in Austria, and are held in Vienna, Salzburg, Innsbruck, Linz, and Graz. The first "December Market" was held in Vienna in 1298. Vienna holds 20 different Christmas markets around the city. Most Christmas markets open in late November and last through December, closing between Christmas Day and New Year's Day, with a few staying open for New Year's.

The largest Christmas market and one of the most well known is the Vienna Christmas World on Rathausplatz, near the Rathaus, Vienna's historic city hall. The market draws 3 million people each year and includes 150 unique stalls that offer traditional Austrian foods, Christmas decorations and ornaments, handicrafts, and drinks. The Vienna Christmas World on Rathausplatz also features an advent theme park called the Adventzauber with workshops and cultural performances that cater to families and young children. Visitors to the Vienna Christmas World can also ice skate on a 3,000-square-metre (32,000 sq ft) ice rink and on frozen paths that run through the Rathausplatz Park.

Other famous Christmas markets include the Christmas Market at Schönbrunn Palace, the Art Advent on Karlsplatz, the Christmas Village at Belvedere Palace, and the Christmas Village on Maria-Theresien-Platz. The Christmas Market at Schönbrunn Palace, “Kultur-und-Weihnachtsmarkt,” takes place in front of the imperial palace. It features Austrian handicrafts and goods as well as a cultural program with activities and workshops. The Art Advent on Karlsplatz offers artisan goods, a children's program, and a petting zoo. Popular food specialities include Kinderpunsch (a non-alcoholic punch), Glühwein, Baumstriezel (a Hungarian pastry coated in cinnamon and sugar), Kartoffelpuffer (potato pancakes), Lángos (savory deep fried dough), Schaumkuss (chocolate covered marshmallows), Stollen (bread with candied fruit), Maroni (roasted chestnuts), Bratkartoffel (roasted potato wedges), Lebkuchen (Austrian gingerbread), and baked potatoes.

=== France ===
Christmas markets are traditional in Alsace, France, and most of the towns there have their local Christmas market. Strasbourg has been holding a Christmas market, "Christkindelsmärik," around its cathedral since 1570, when the city was part of the Holy Roman Empire of the German Nation.

=== Germany ===
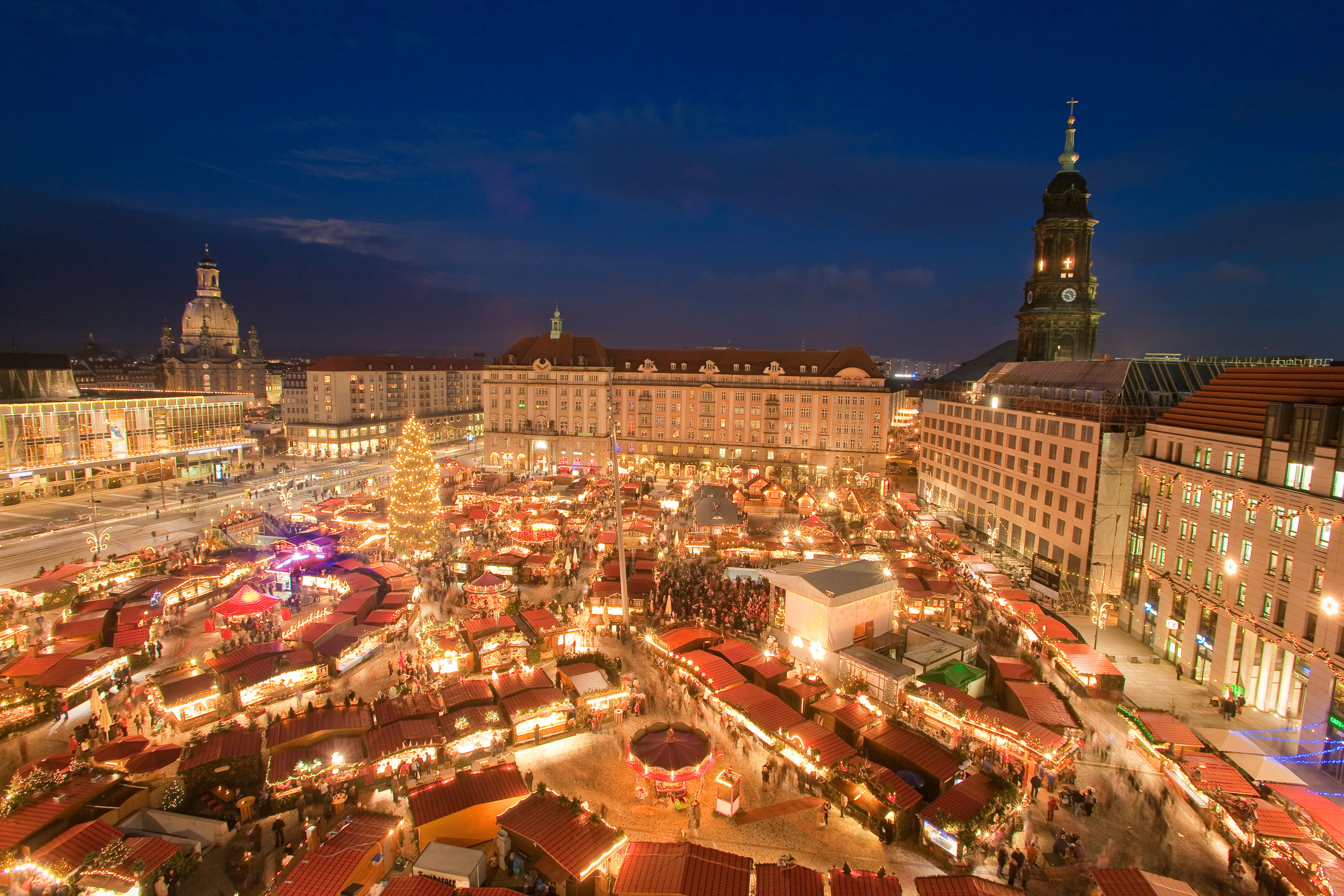
The Striezelmarkt in Dresden, Germany, oldest Christmas market in the world

Famous Christmas markets are held in the cities of Augsburg, Dresden, Erfurt, Frankfurt, Nuremberg, and Stuttgart, making them popular tourist attractions during the Christmas holiday season. The Nuremberg and Dresden markets draw about two million people each year; the Stuttgart and Frankfurt markets attract more than three million visitors.

The two most visited Christmas markets in Germany are found in Dortmund, with more than three and a half million visitors of 300 stalls around a gigantic Christmas tree that stands 45 metres (148 ft) tall, and in Cologne with 4 million people. Additionally, Berlin claims more than 70 markets, which open in late November and close just after Christmas.

=== Italy ===
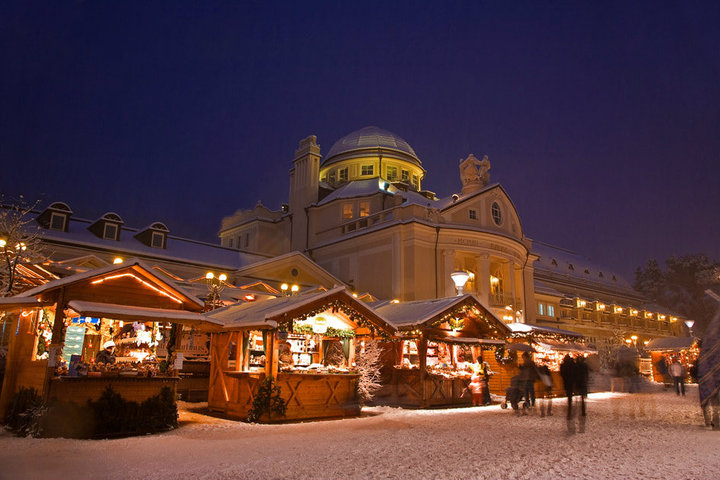
Christmas market in Merano, Italy

Christmas in Italy begins on 8 December with the Feast of the Immaculate Conception, the day on which traditionally Christmas trees are erected, and ends on 6 January of the following year with Epiphany.

In Italy, in Bologna, it was held for the first time in the 18th century and linked to the feast of Saint Lucia. The tradition of the markets has however spread in Italy predominantly especially since the 1990s, with the birth of the first modern markets: among these, the first ever was that of Bolzano, born in 1991, which was followed by others in the area of Alto Adige, in particular in Merano, Bressanone, Vipiteno and Brunico.

The Trento Christmas market, established in 1993, is renowned in Trentino. In Naples, where the tradition of the Neapolitan nativity scene has been famous for centuries, the exhibition of the nativity scenes made in the city's artisan shops is held every year in via San Gregorio Armeno. Noteworthy are the Christmas markets at Piazza Navona in Rome, in Verona, in Gubbio, in Alberobello, in Aosta, in Turin, in Asti, in Arezzo, in Florence, in Trieste, in Livigno, in Santa Maria Maggiore, Arco and in Cison di Valmarino.

=== United Kingdom ===
In 1982, Lincoln, England, established an annual Christmas market in early December. This remains one of the most extensive such market by area in the United Kingdom, with a claimed total of over 300 stalls attracting more than 100,000 visitors over its four days. Starting in 1997, Frankfurt Christmas Markets were established with support from Frankfurt in Birmingham, Edinburgh, Leeds, and Manchester. Other large Christmas markets have been held in England in Bath (since 2000) and Liverpool (since 2006). The Christmas markets are such a success that they are becoming a major pull factor to increase trade and visitor numbers to towns and cities.

Birmingham's Christmas Market, primarily located on New Street between the Bullring shopping centre and the Council House, is the "largest outdoor Christmas market in the UK" as well as the "largest authentic German Christmas market outside of Germany or Austria". The market also offers live entertainment on the main stage. The market is held for approximately six weeks every year and usually closes around 23 December. Manchester's Christmas Markets have also been successful, with 300 stalls over eight city locations, with each location being themed to create a different atmosphere such as French, World, and German, with European-themed stalls on the Albert Square, Manchester proving to be the most popular.

=== United States ===
German immigrants carried Christmas market celebrations to the United States. It is celebrated in such cities as Chicago, Denver, Salt Lake City, Tulsa, and Grand Rapids.

=== Other countries ===
As noted, other countries have also established such markets. The Christmas market of Barcelona starts on 13 December, Saint Lucy's Day, and is called Fira de Santa Llúcia. It has been held in the square of Barcelona Cathedral since 1786.

The GUM-Fair was opened on the Red Square in Moscow, Russia, in 2013. It has been running ever since from December to March and is the biggest and most popular Christmas market in Russia.

A traditional Christmas market was held for the first time in Sibiu, Romania, in 2007.

The annual Christmas market in Riga, Latvia, is held from late November to early January in the square next to the Riga Cathedral. It has consistently been recognised as one of Europe's most affordable Christmas market destinations, according to the Post Office Travel Money report.

== Gallery ==
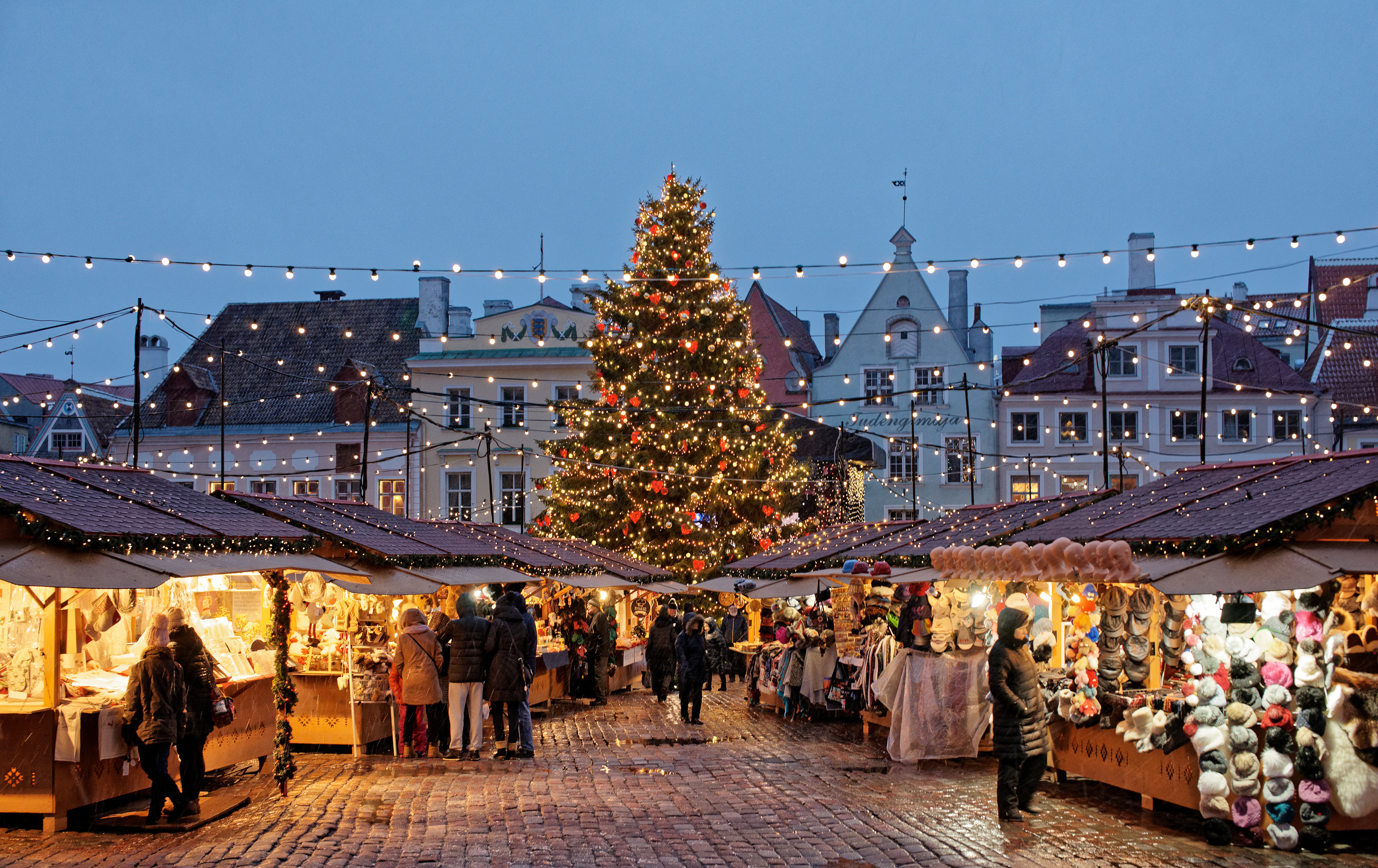
Tallinna Jõuluturg in Tallinn, Estonia

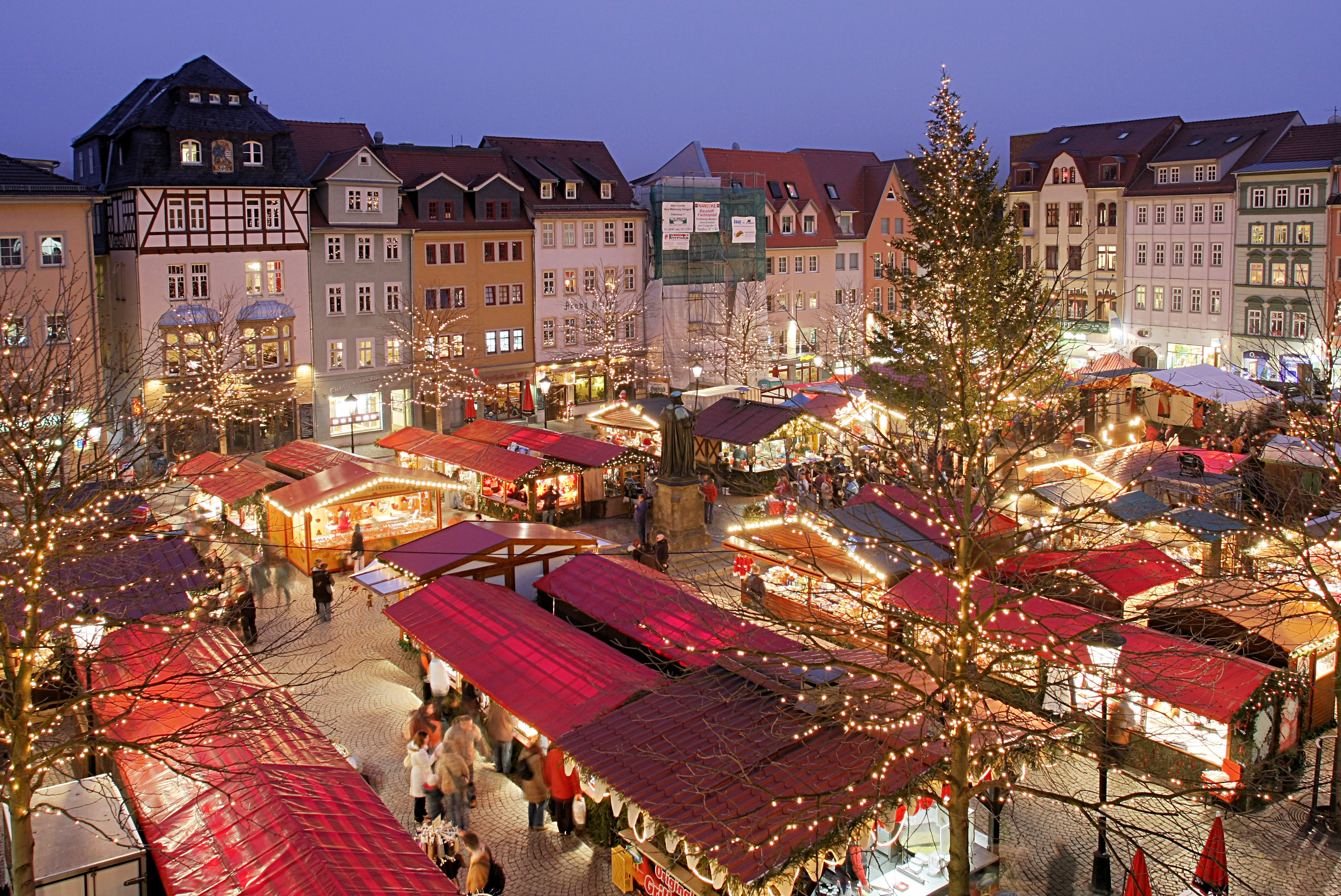
Christmas market in Jena, Germany

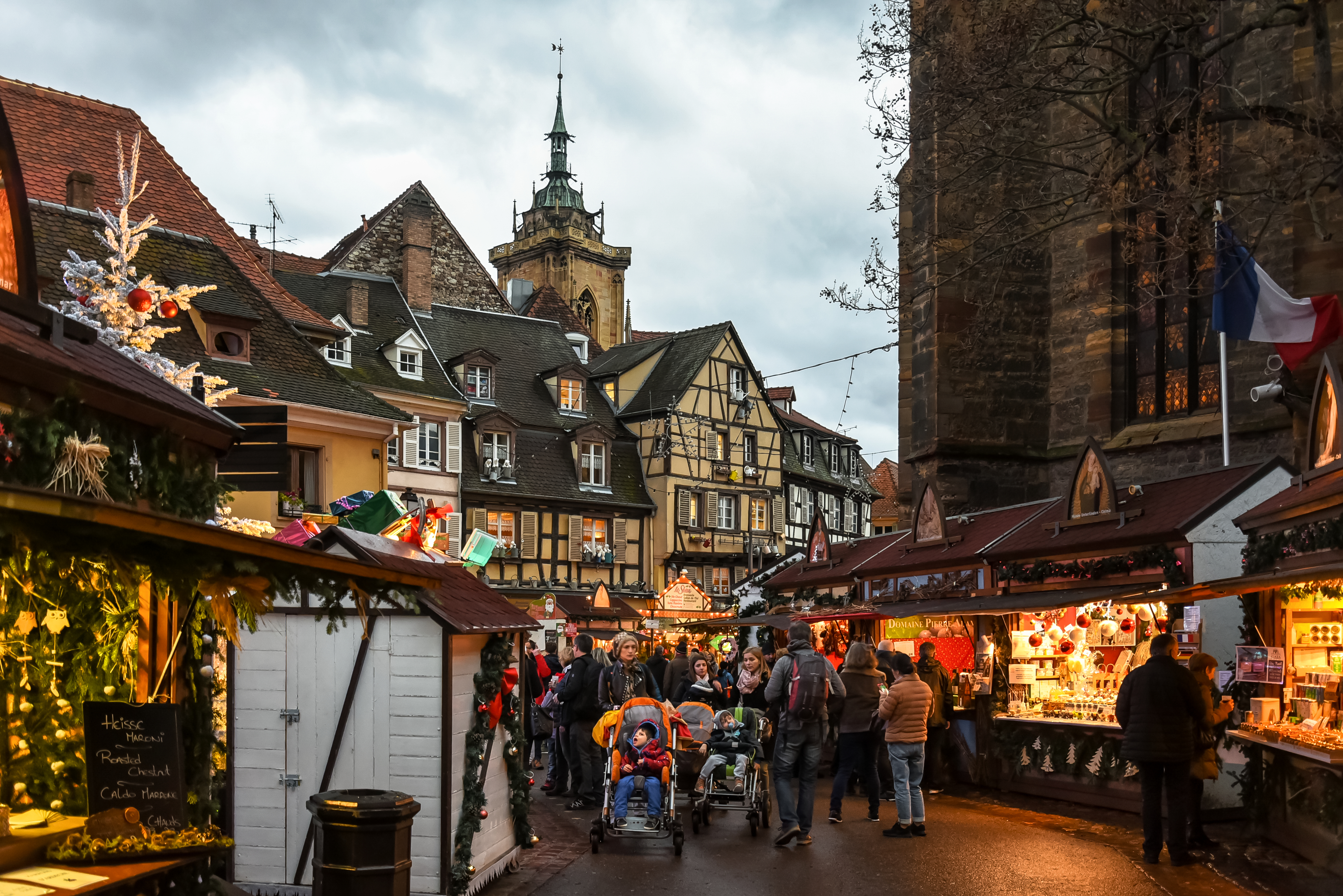
Christmas market in Colmar, France

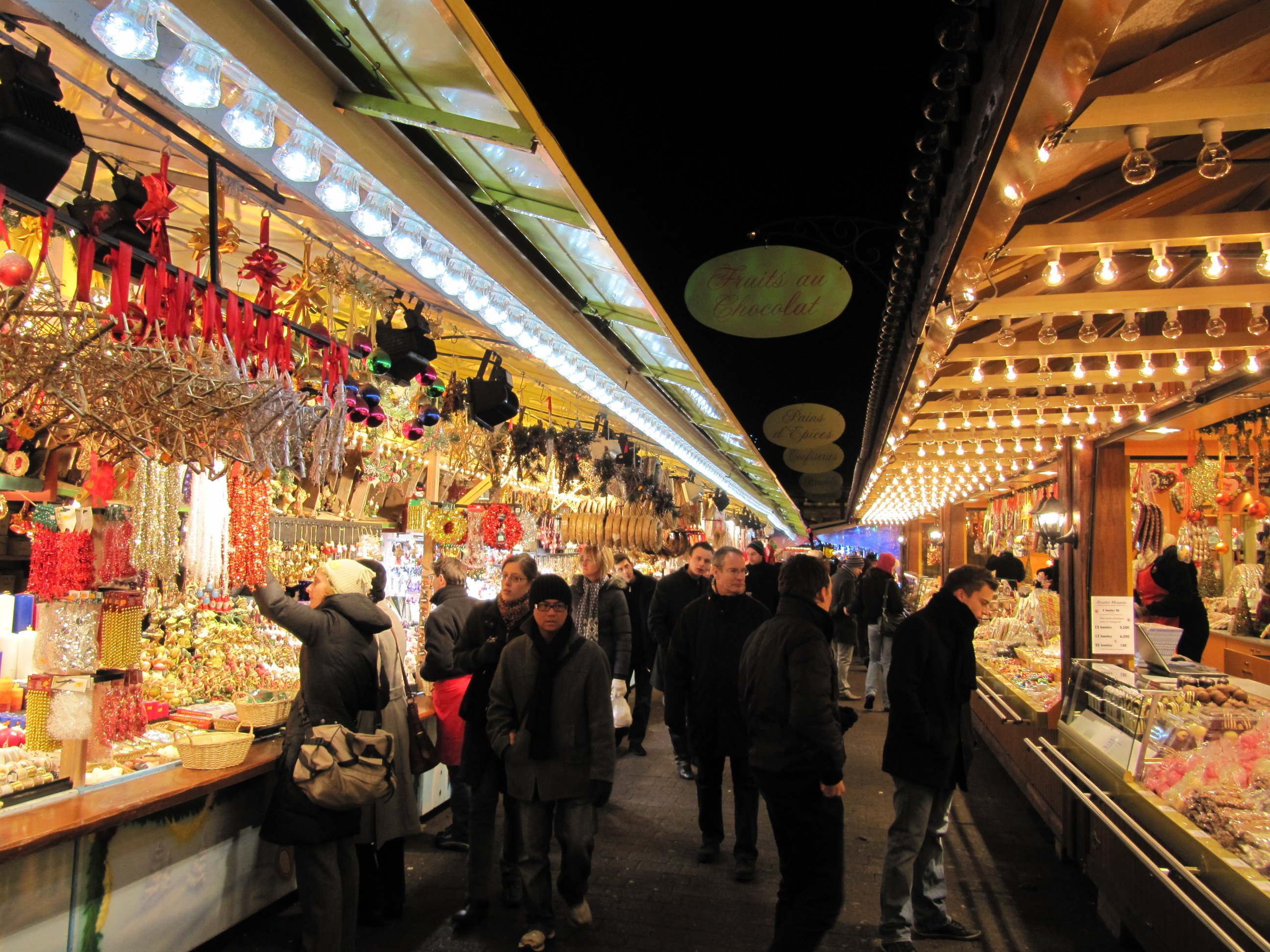
Christkindelsmärik in Strasbourg, France

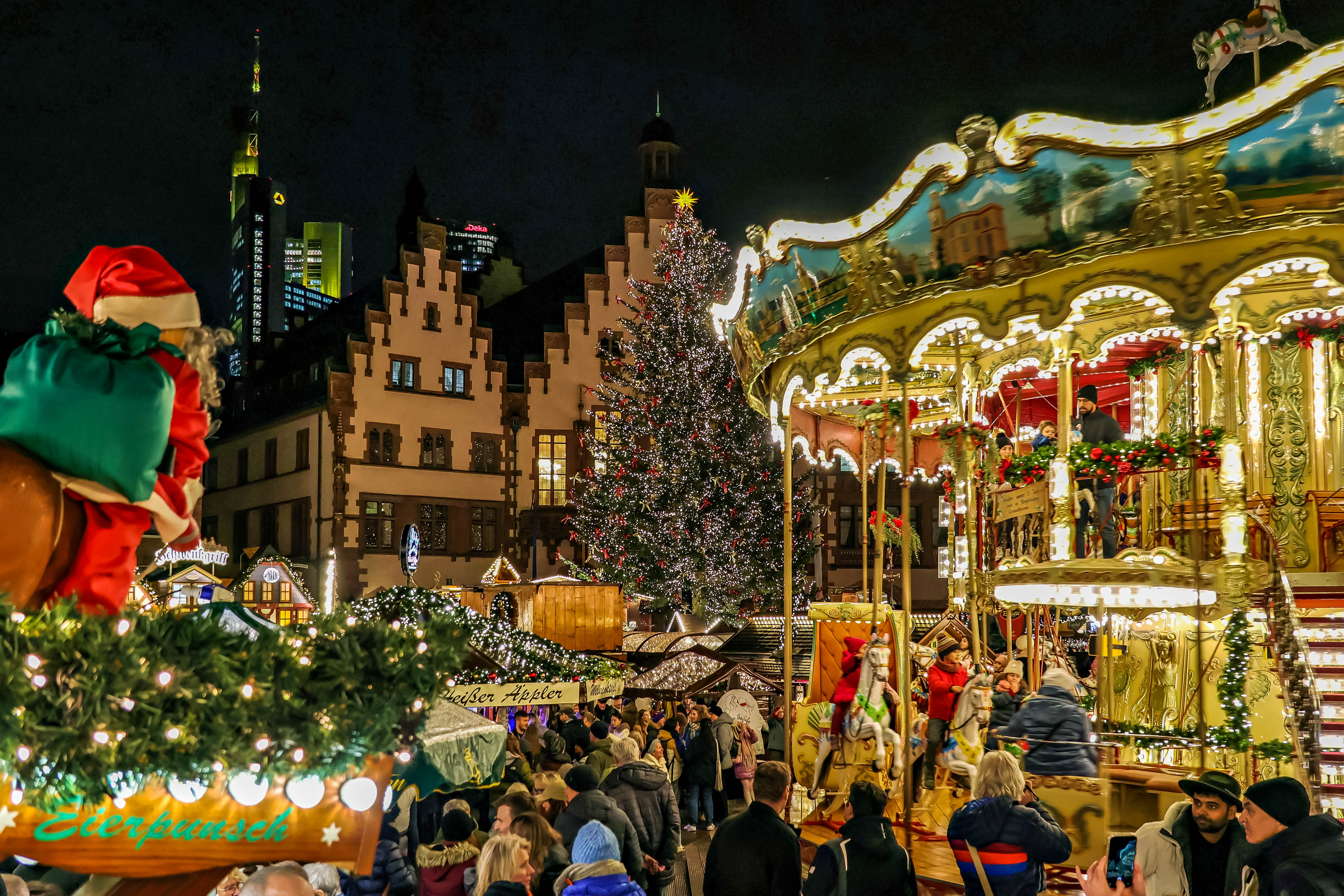
Christmas market in Frankfurt, Germany

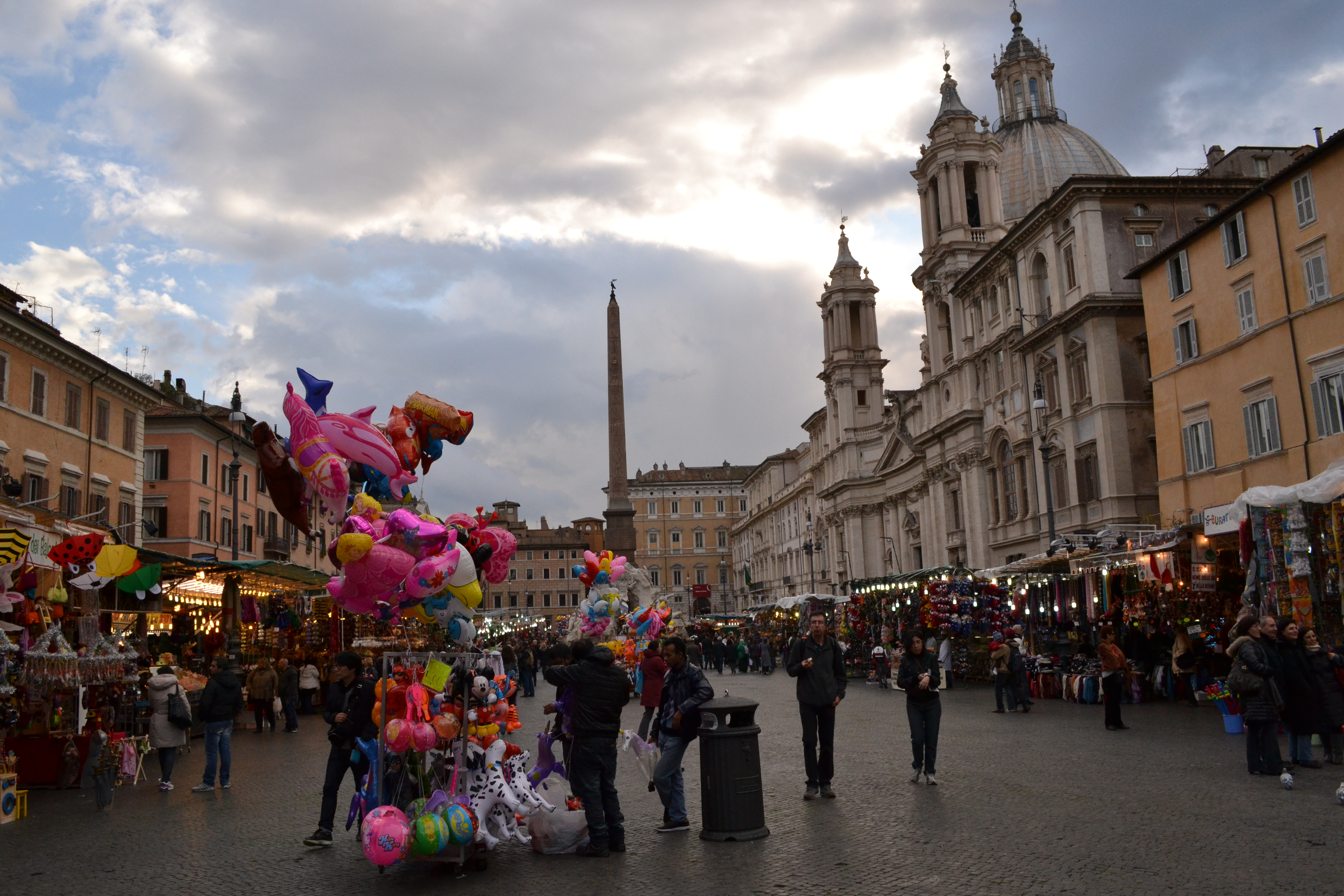
Christmas market at Piazza Navona in Rome, Italy

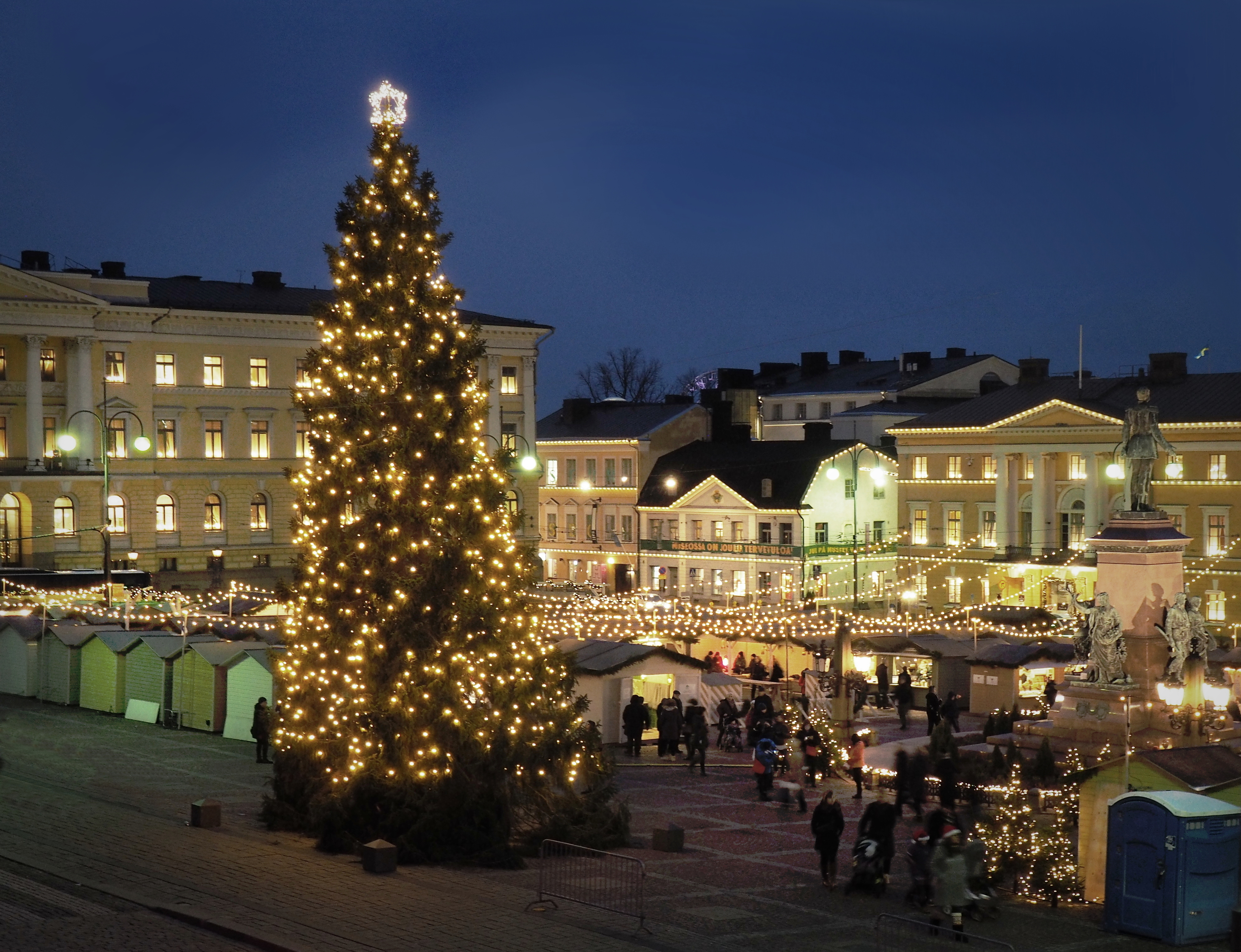
Tuomaan Markkinat at the Senate Square in Helsinki, Finland

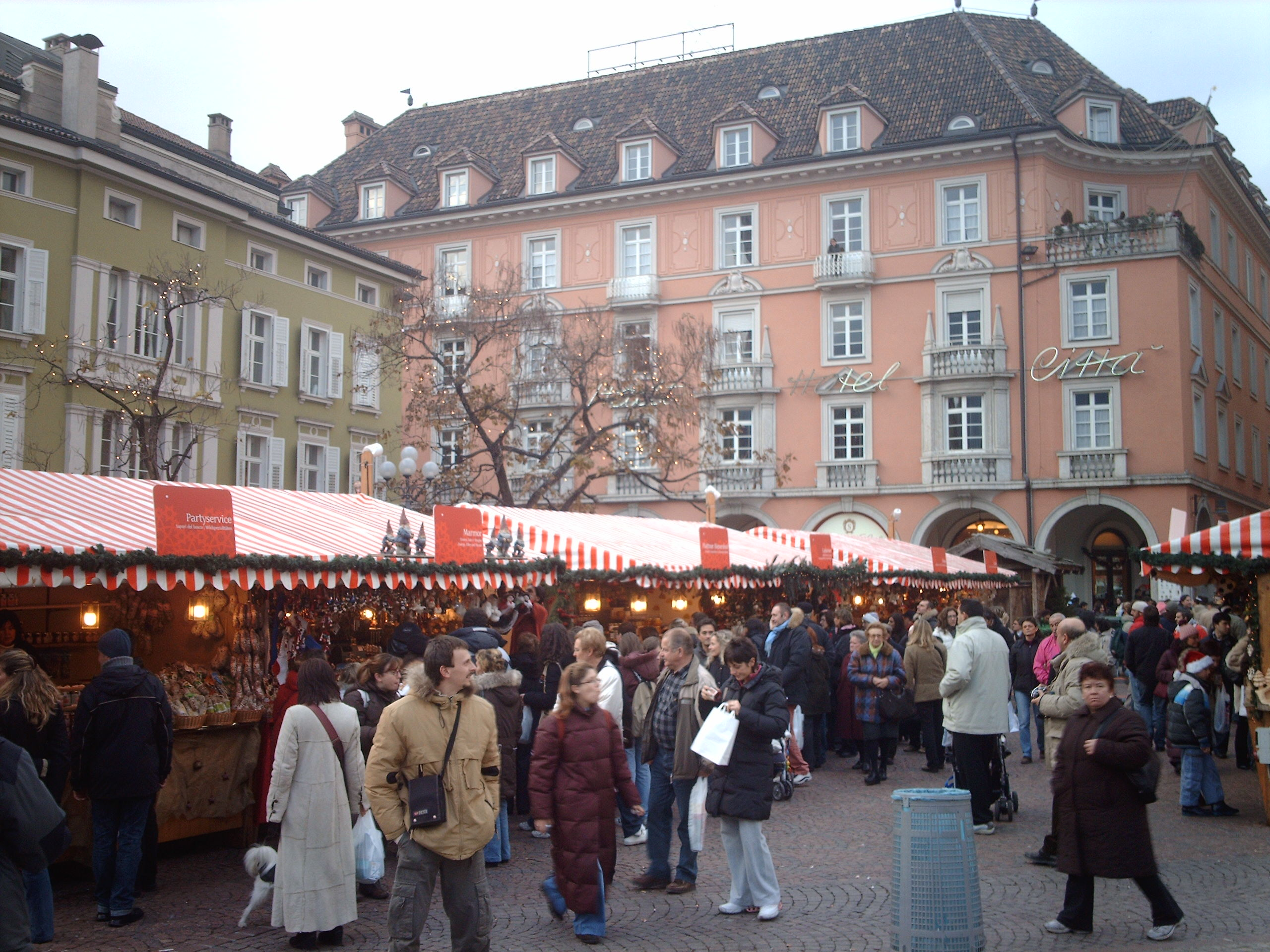
Christmas market in Bolzano, Italy

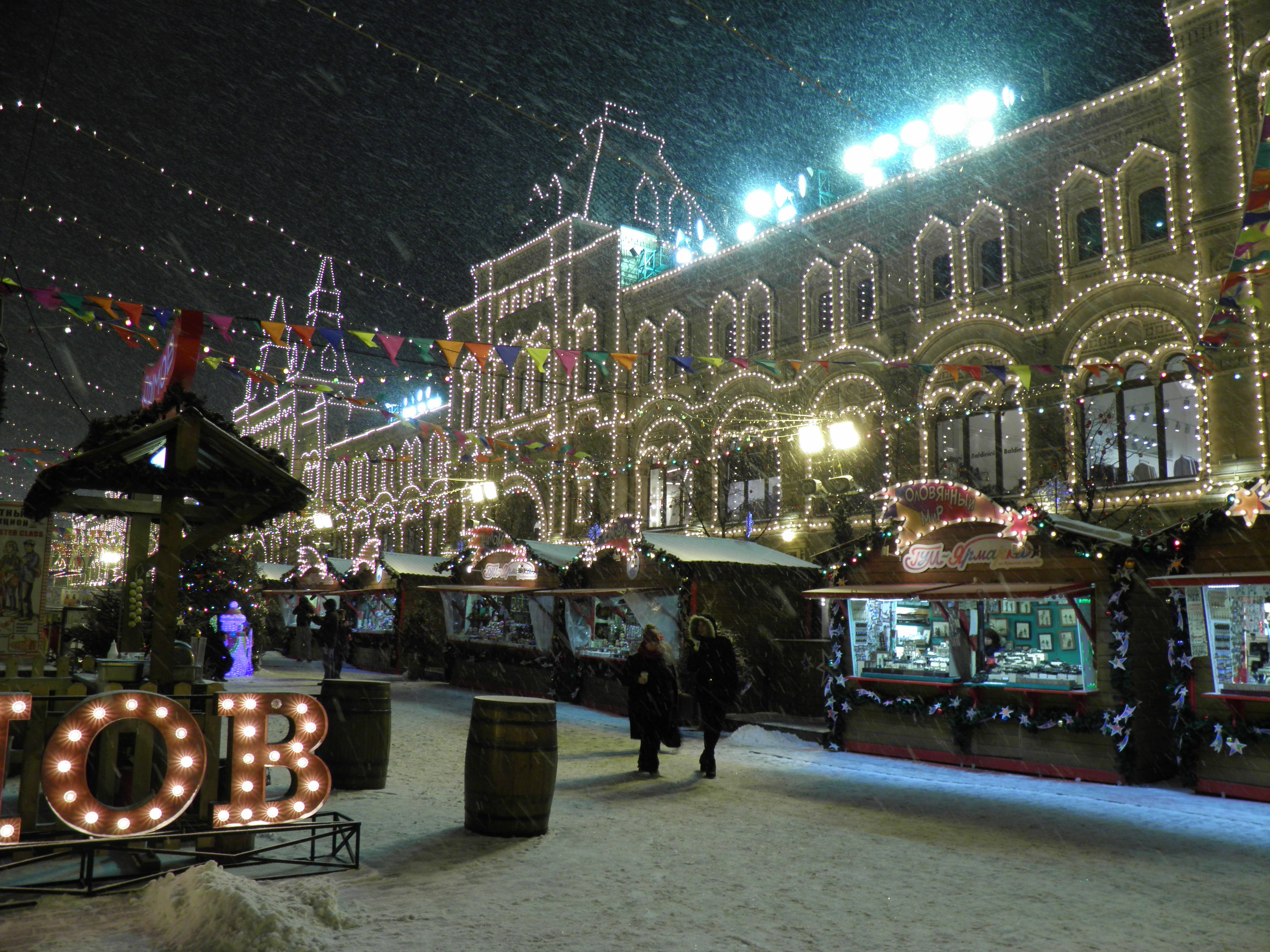
GUM-fair at the Red Square in Moscow, Russia

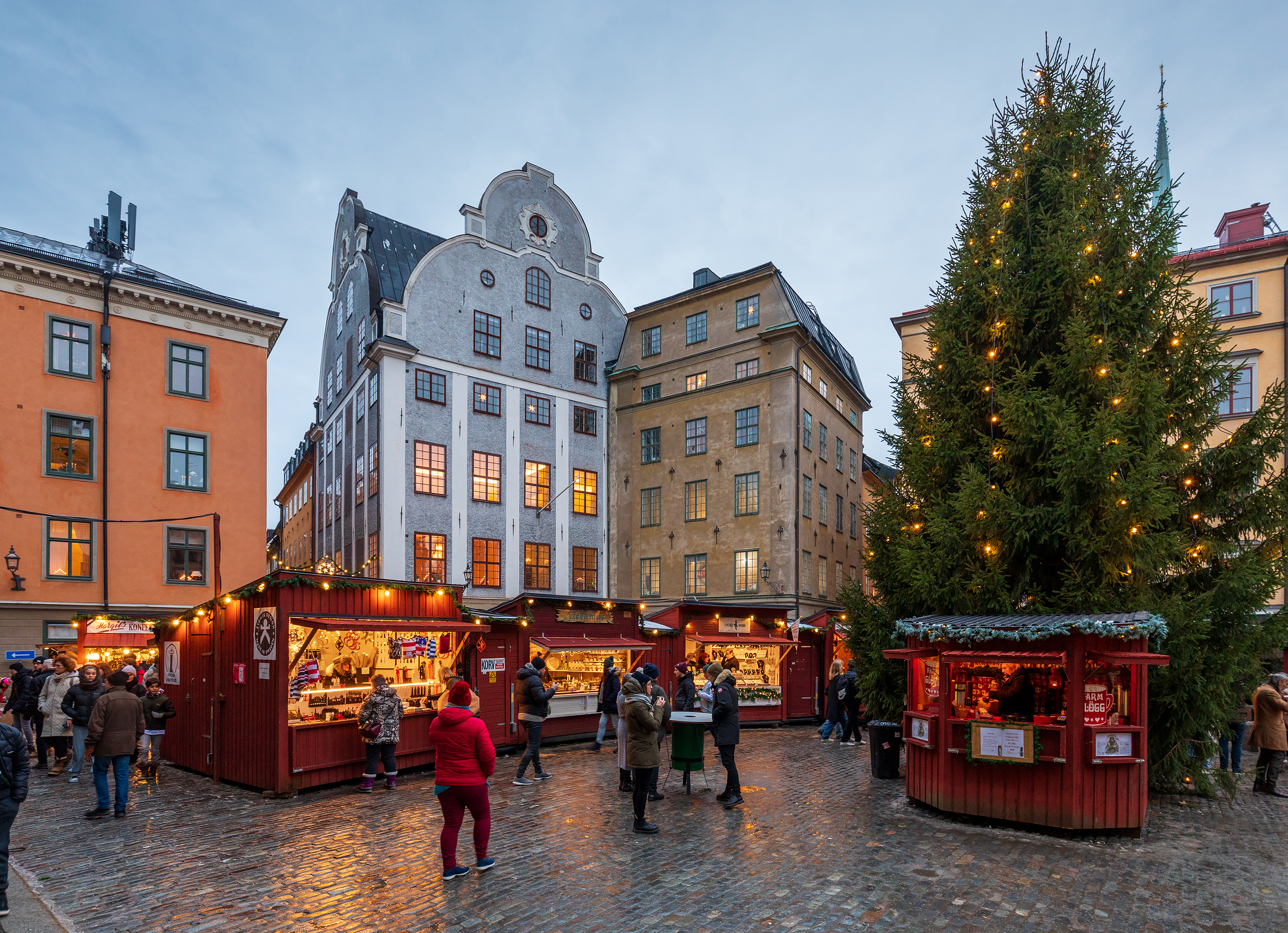
Julmarknad ("Christmas market") in Gamla stan, Stockholm, Sweden

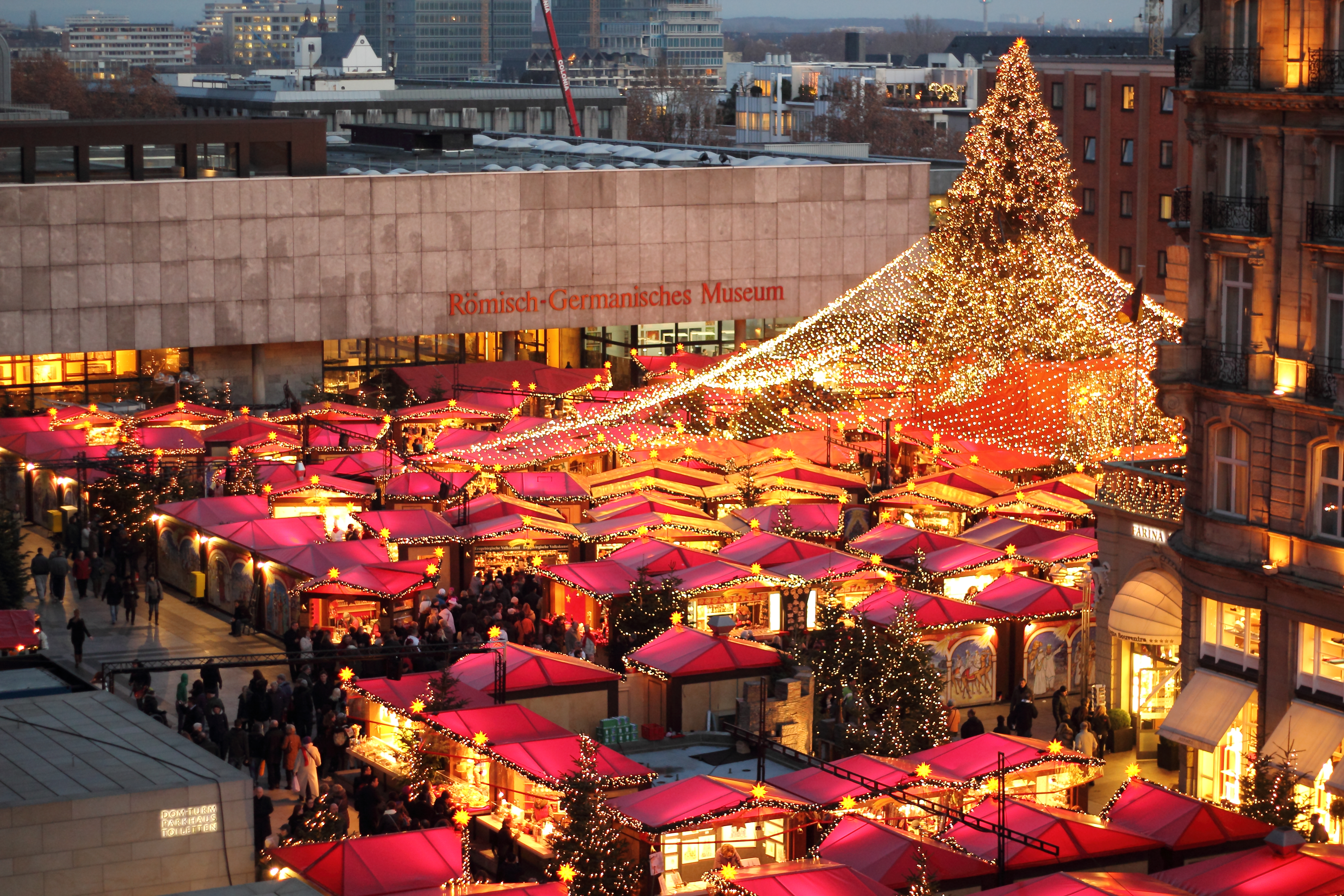
Christmas market in Cologne, Germany

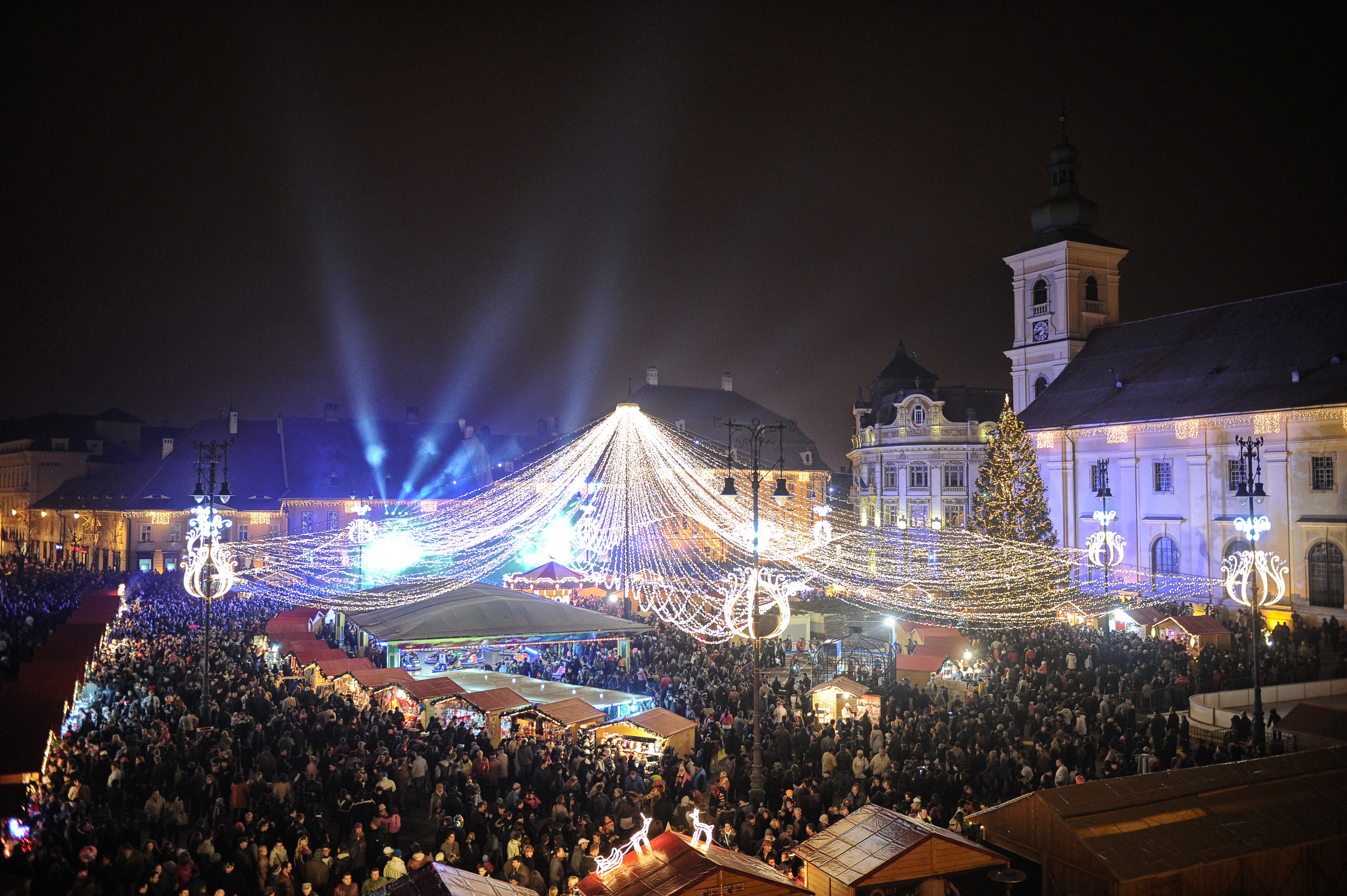
Sibiu Christmas market in Sibiu, Romania

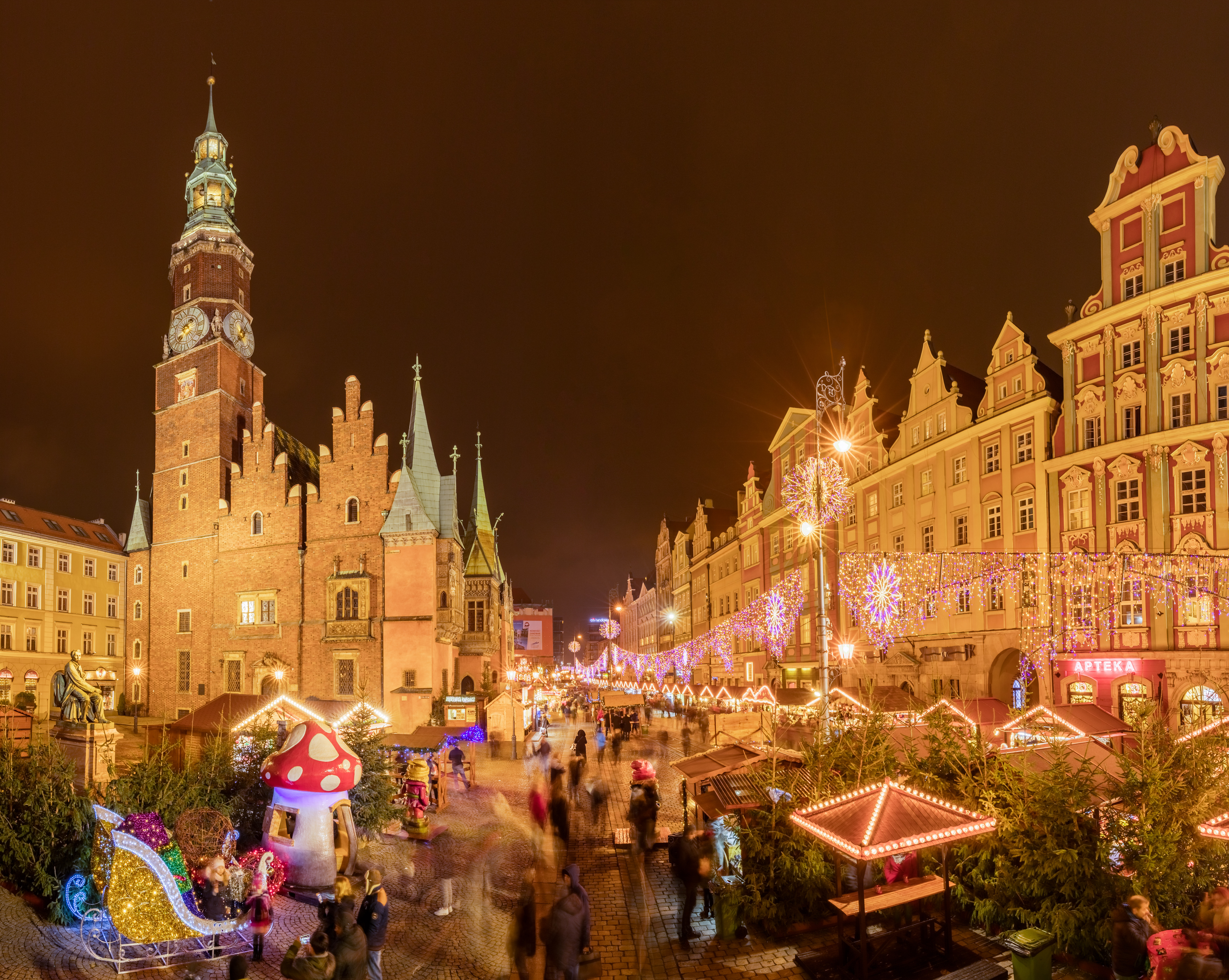
Christmas market in Wrocław, Poland

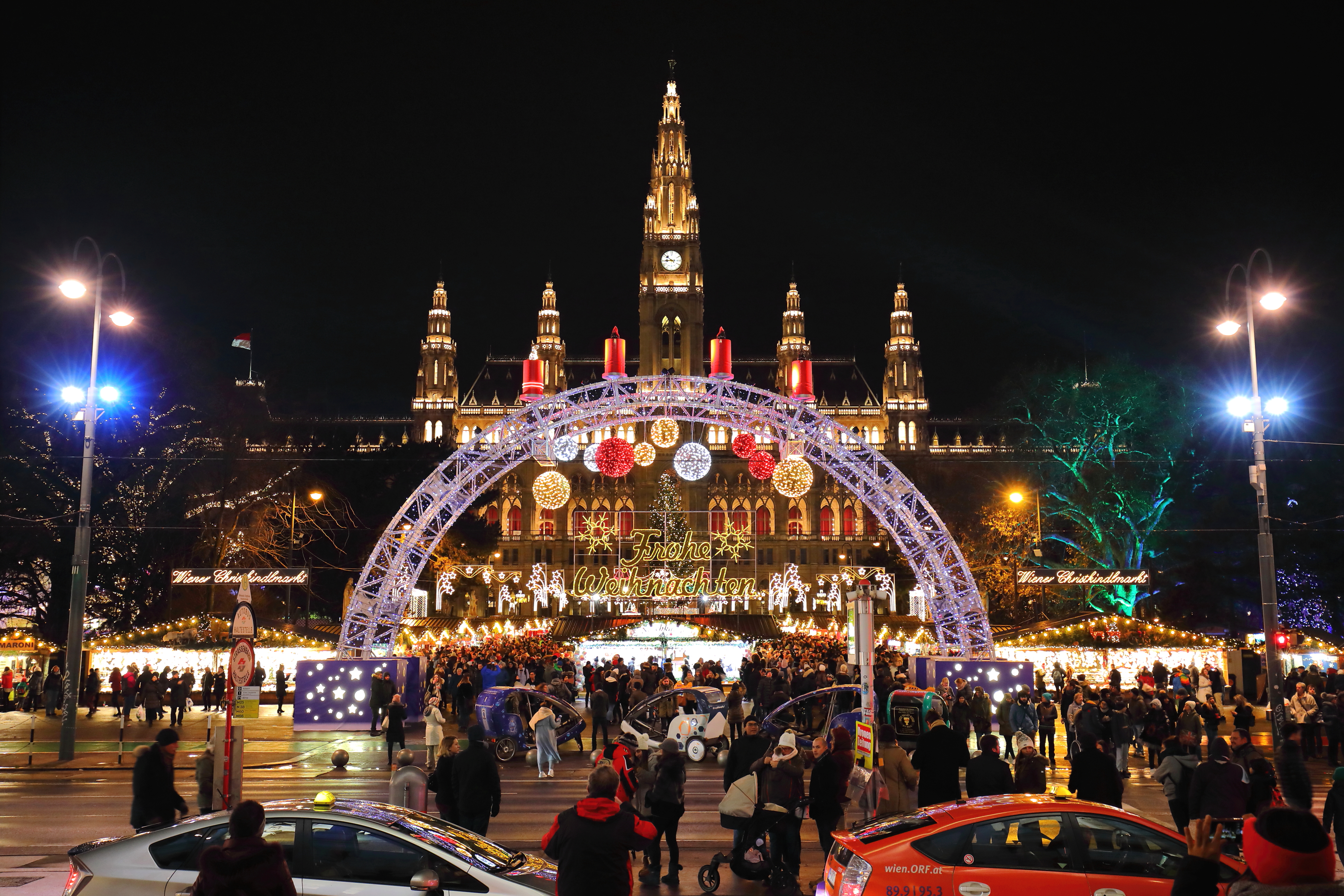
Christmas market in Vienna, Austria

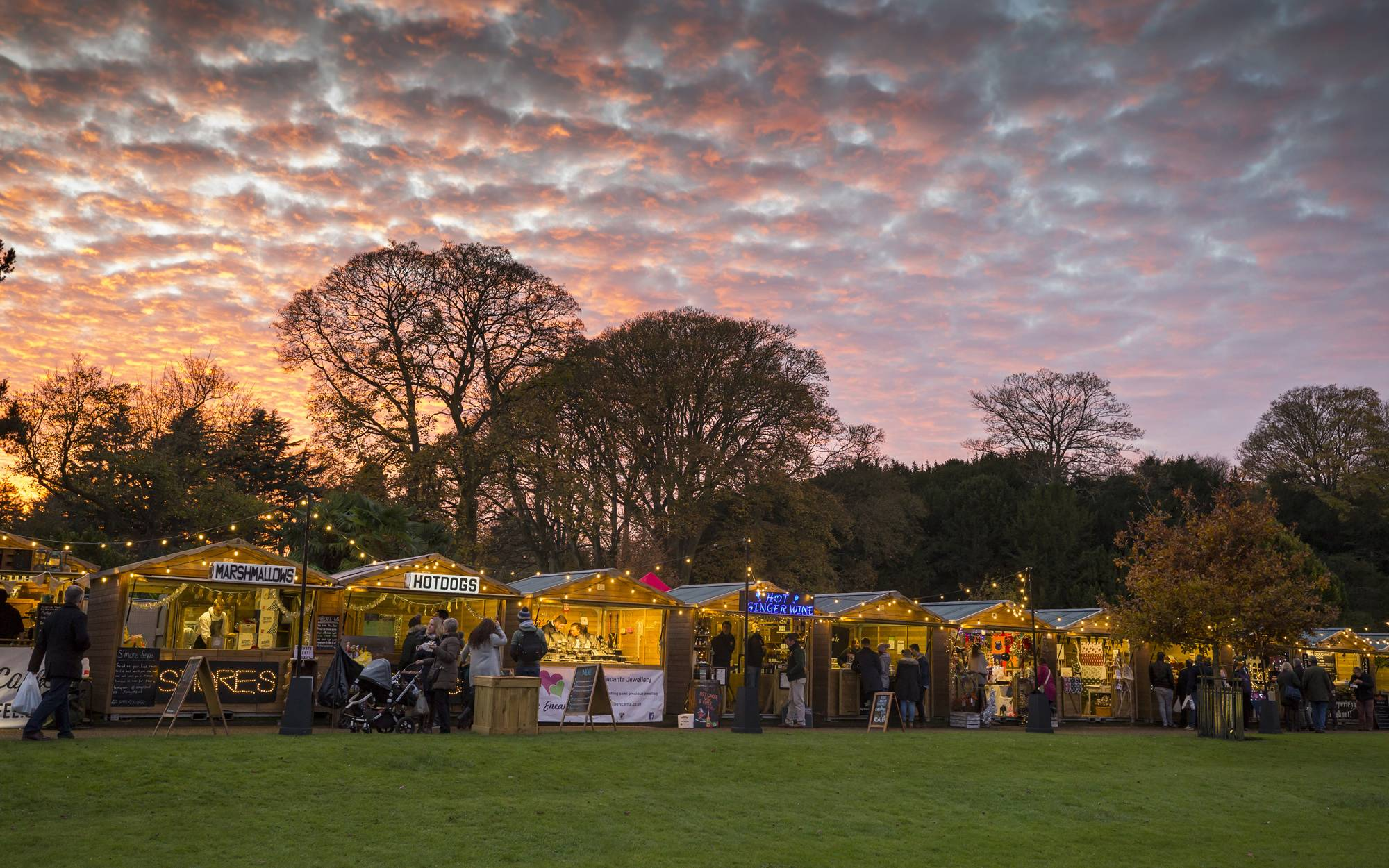
Christmas market at Waddesdon Manor, UK

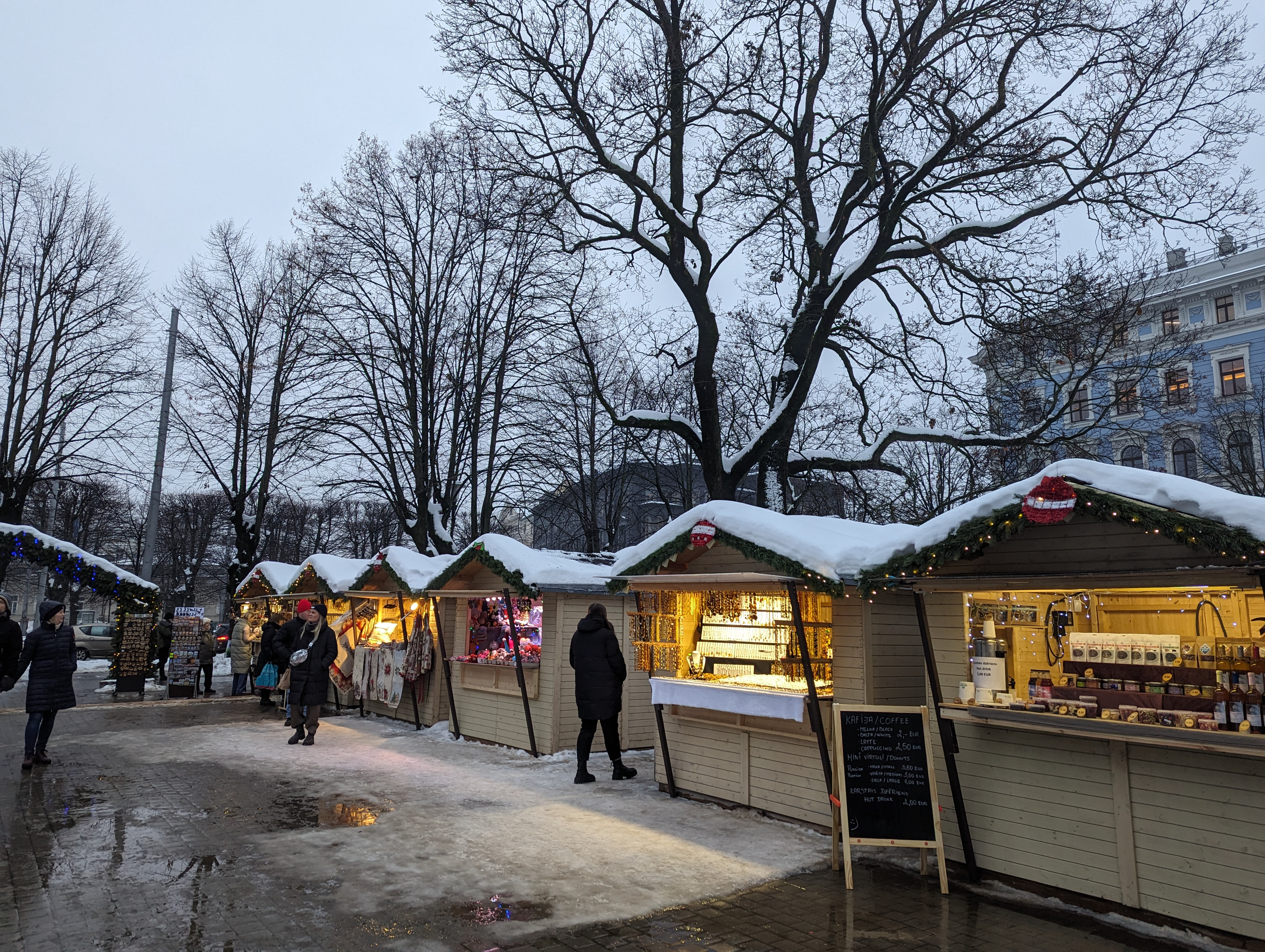
Christmas market in Riga, Latvia

== See also ==
- Christmas traditions
