= Red Square Christmas Market =

Christmas market in Moscow, Russia

GUM-Fair ГУМ-ярмарка
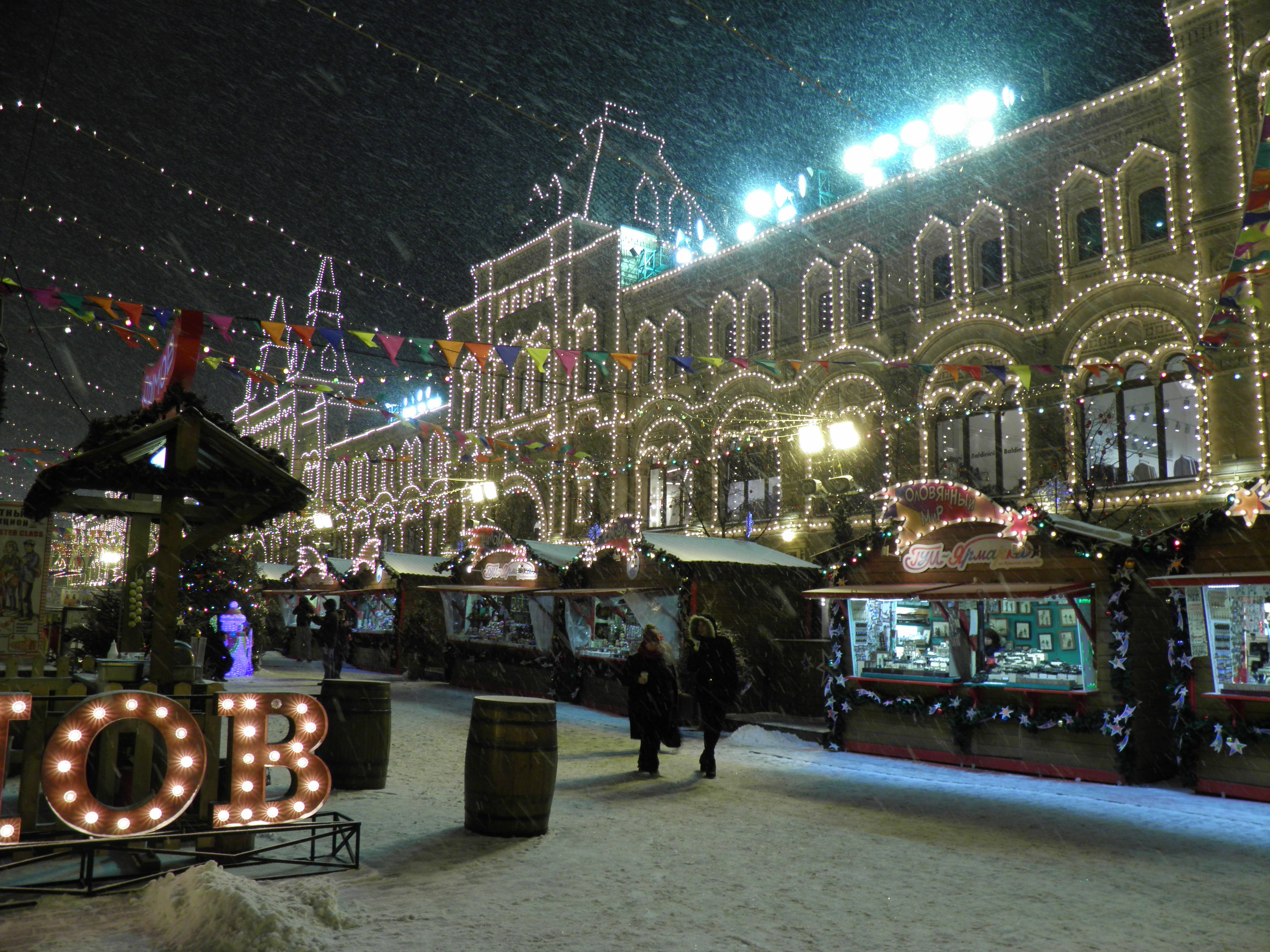
- Stands of the fair at nighttime
- Nickname: Red Square Christmas Market; Red Square New Year's Market
- Genre: Christmas market
- Date: 11 December – 1 March
- Locations: Red Square, Moscow
- Coordinates: 55.7541°N 37.6214°E
- Country: Russia
- Years active: 2013–present
- Inaugurated: 1 December 2013
- Attendance: Hundreds of thousands
- Capacity: 63 stands
- Website: gum-katok.ru

The Red Square Christmas Market (Russian: Рождественская ярмарка на Красной площади, romanized: Rozhdestvyenskaya yarmarka na Krasnoy ploshchadi) or Red Square New Year's Market (Russian: Новигодная ярмарка на Красной площади, romanized: Novigodnaya yarmarka na Krasnoy ploshchadi), officially the GUM-Fair (Russian: ГУМ-ярмарка, romanized: GUM-yarmarka), is an annually held Christmas market at the Red Square in Moscow, Russia, run by the GUM department store that operates daily from December 11th to March 1st. It's the most popular place to visit and buy New Year's gifts from in the winter in Russia and also the largest fair, with up to 63 stands attracting hundreds of thousands of visitors every year.

== History ==
Moscow has been home to a lot of trade, especially the Red Square, since the Middle Ages, with many old shopping streets, such as Nikolskaya or Varvarka being formed due to the trade. Under Catherine the Great, Russia started designing newer and modern shopping spaces in the places of older outdated merchant rows. Thus, the first version of the Upper Trading Rows appeared on Muscovite maps that are nowadays known as the GUM department store, which opened in 1893. The Christmas fair was opened for the first time in 2013, on the 120th anniversary of the opening of the GUM department store.

== Stands ==
There are 63 stands on the fair, that are decorated and built just like other European Christmas markets, with the difference being that Russians concentrate more on Novy God than Christmas (which takes place on January 7th) itself. People can buy "Yolka" balls, knitted mittens, traditional Russian decorations and food from Russia, regions under Russian influence and generally popular Christmas food such as Bavarian sausages or Russian blinchiki. A circular "battery" of counters is located in the center, where they sell balloons, going from 500 up to 1,000 rubles. Ded Moroz or Cheburashka figures are also sold, costing up to 12,600 rubles. There are also carousels, an ice rink and stands where children can take pictures with Ded Moroz and Snegurochka.

== Gallery ==
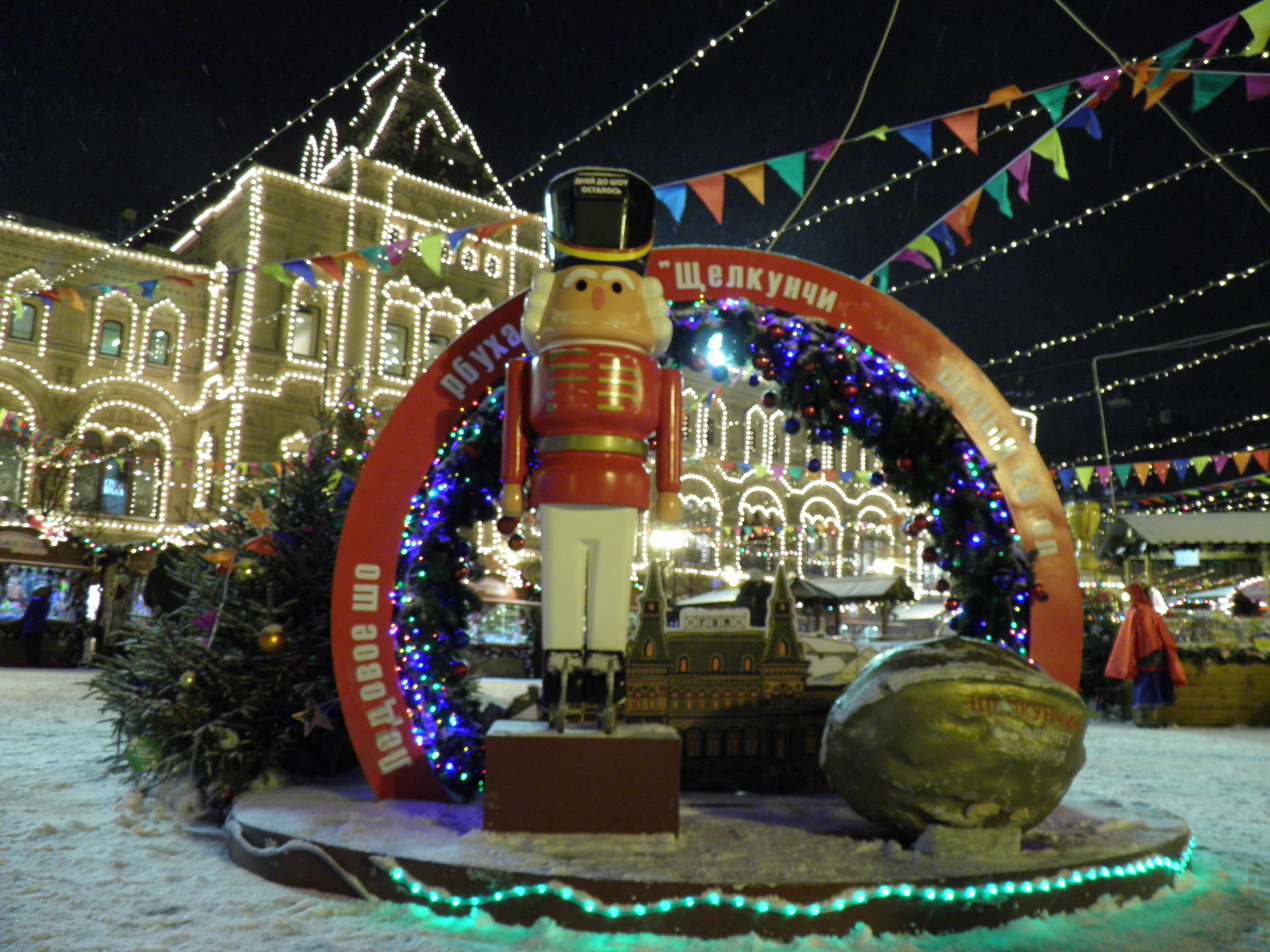
A big nutcracker doll at the center

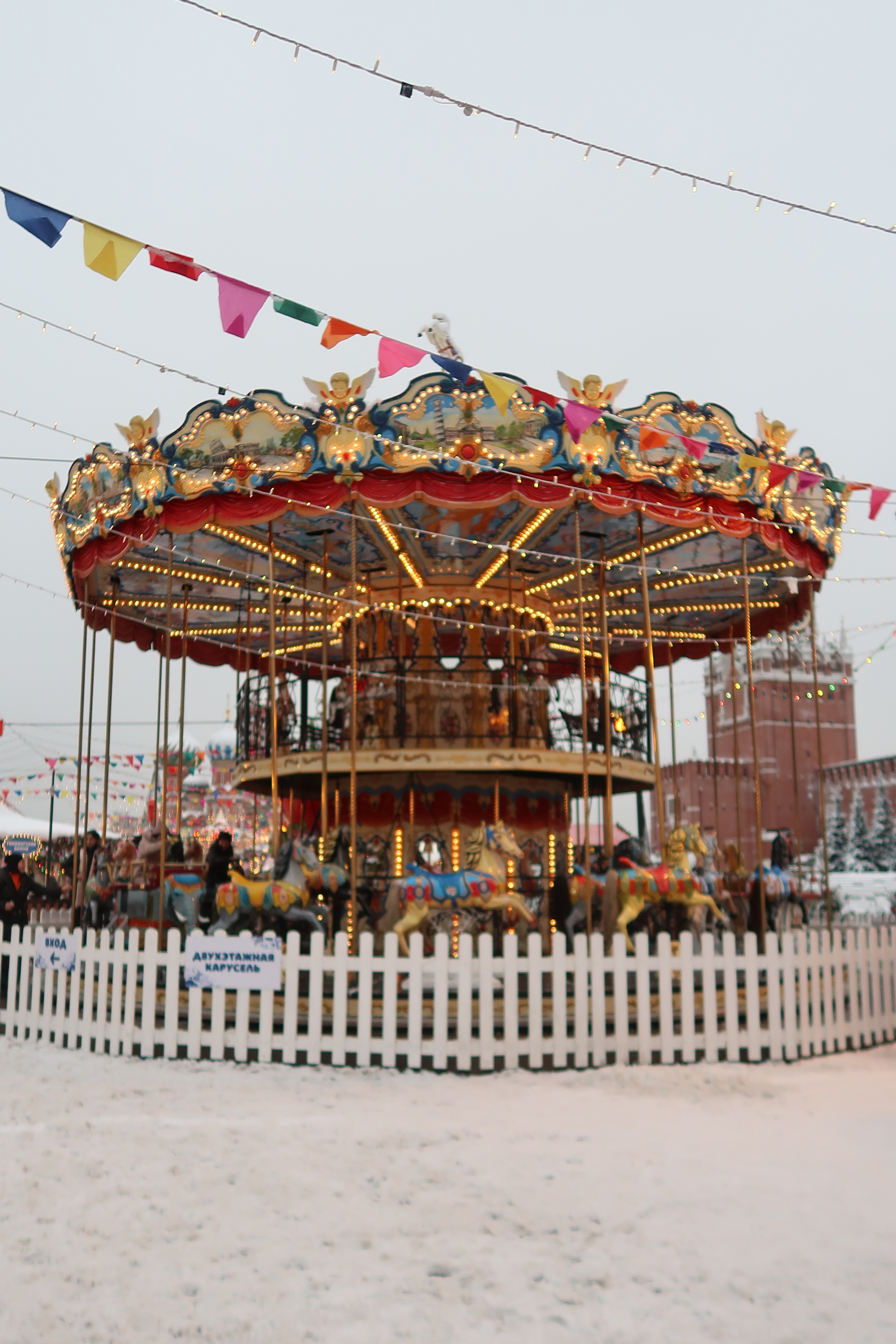
Carousel at daytime

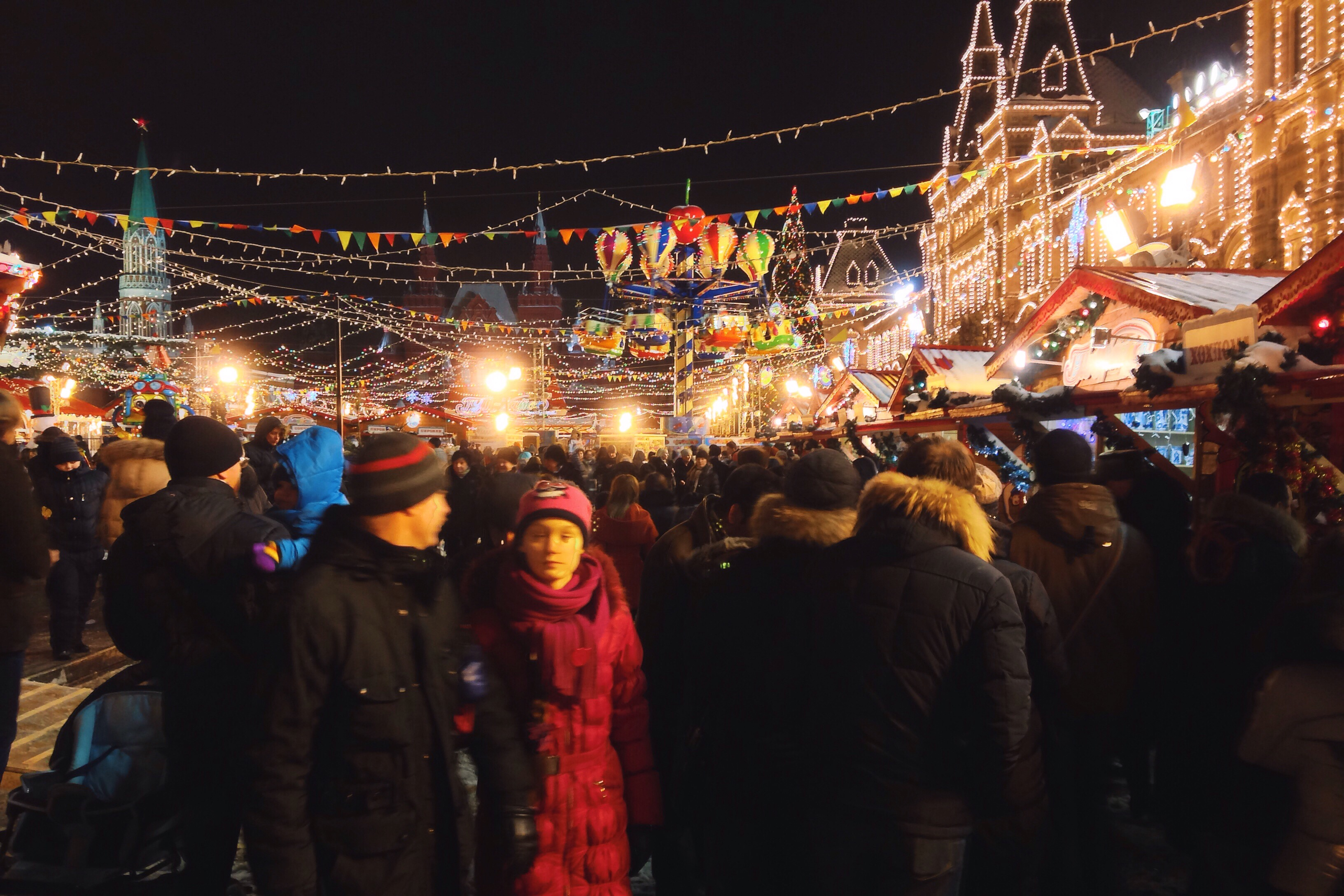
Busy streets at night

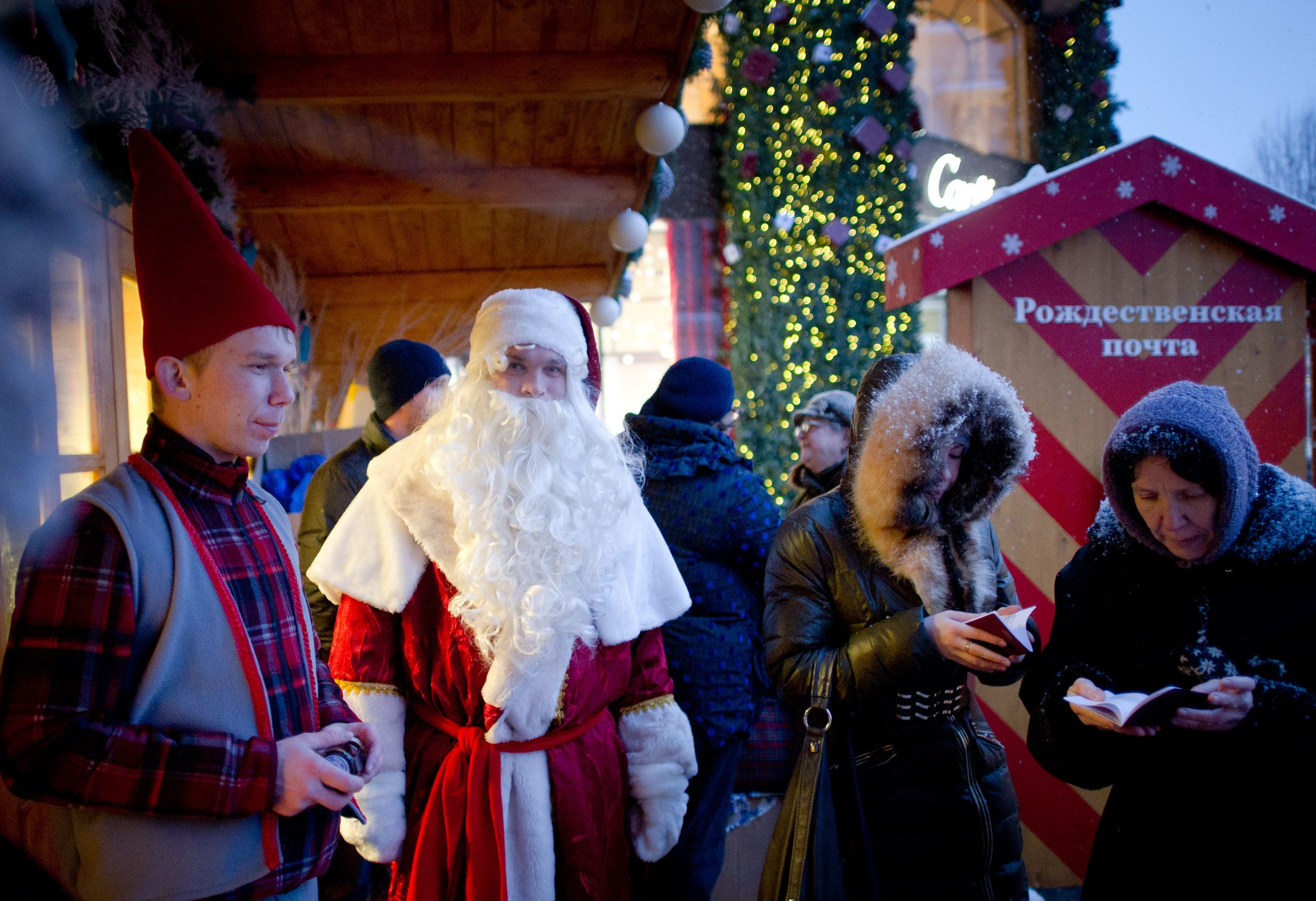
Ded Moroz attending the fair

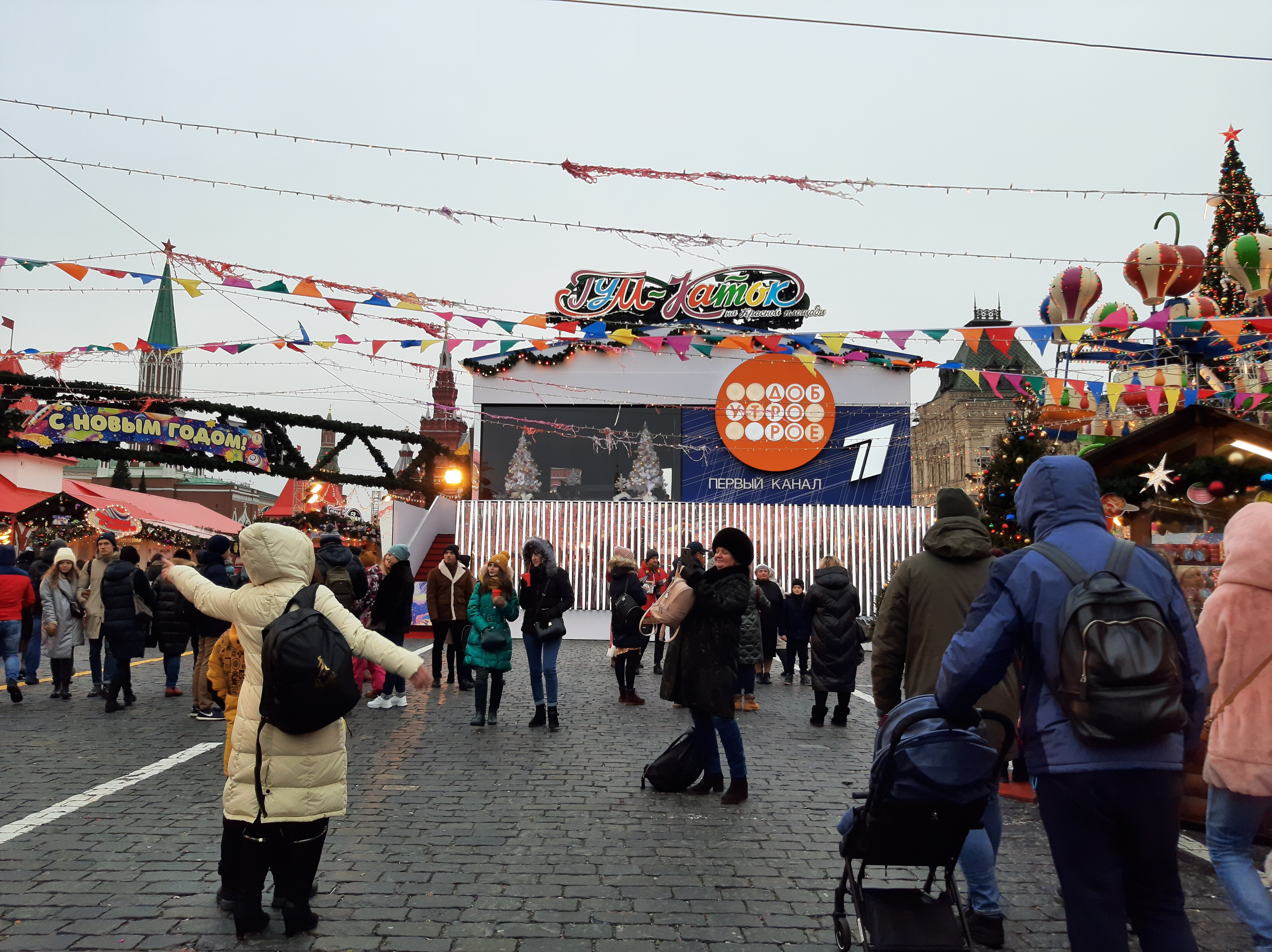
Station of Pervyy Kanal

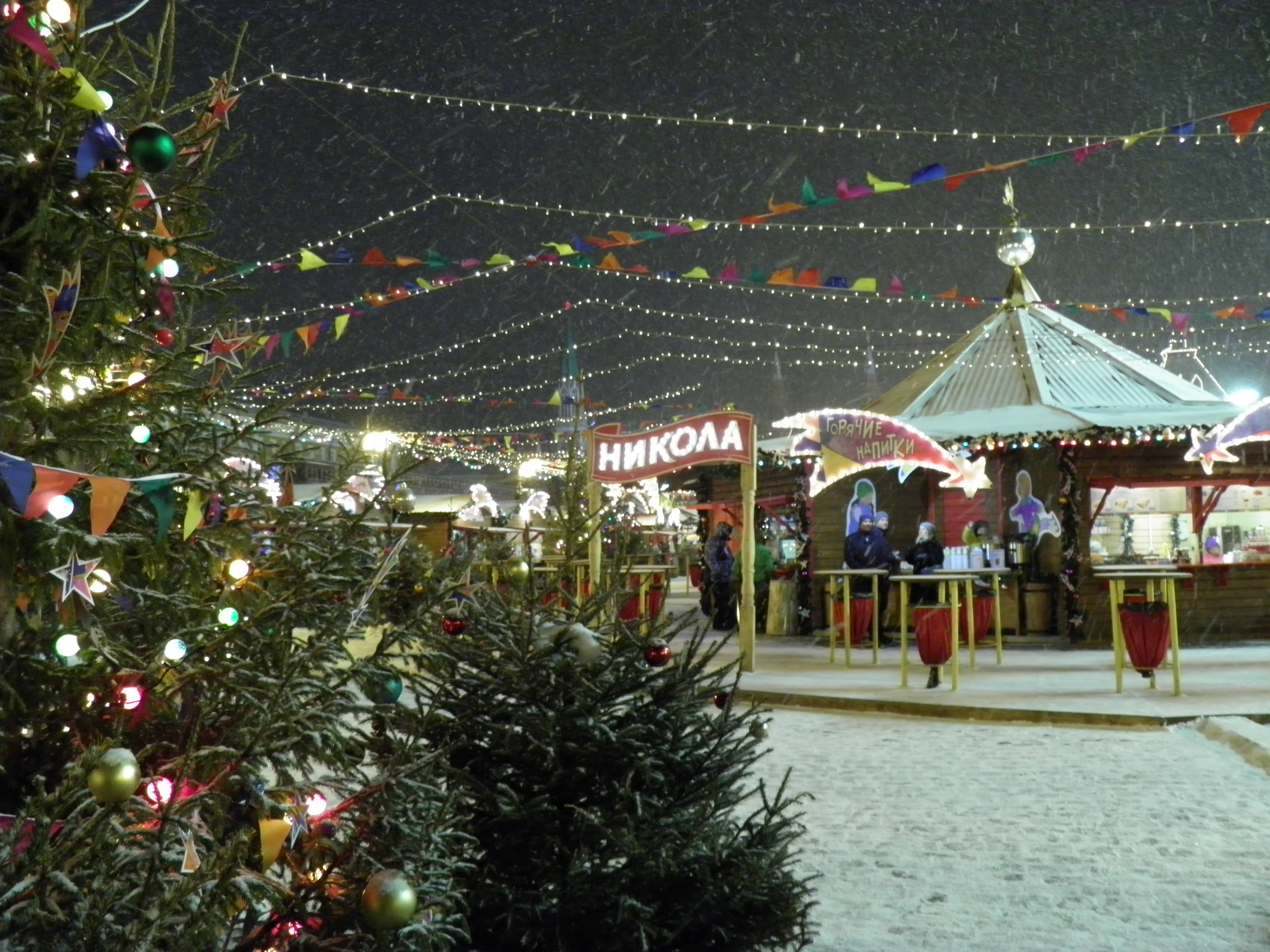
Stands of the fair covered in snow
