= GUM (department store) =

Russian department store group

Coordinates: 55°45′17″N 37°37′17″E

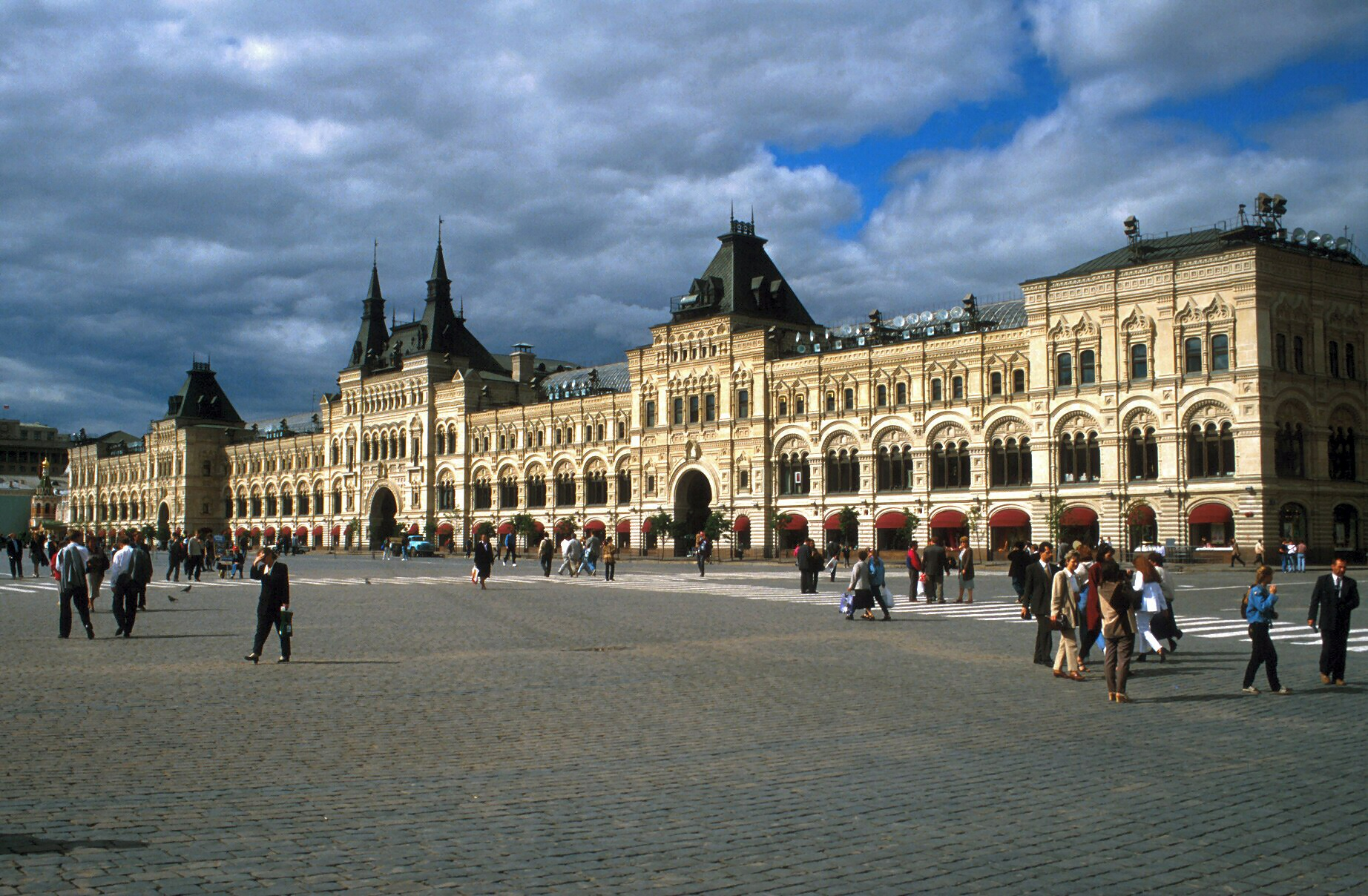
The GUM façade faces Red Square

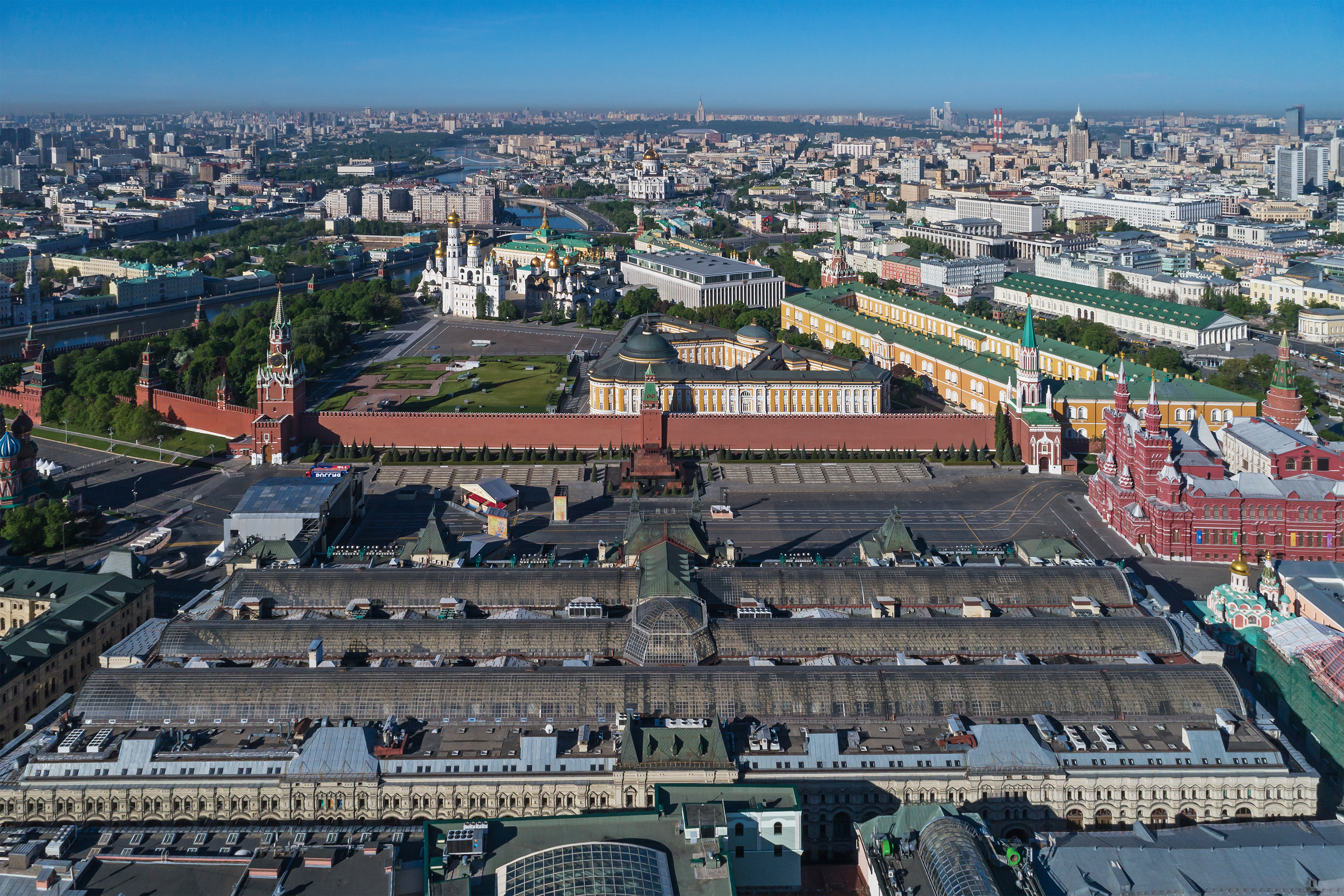
Aerial view of GUM roof

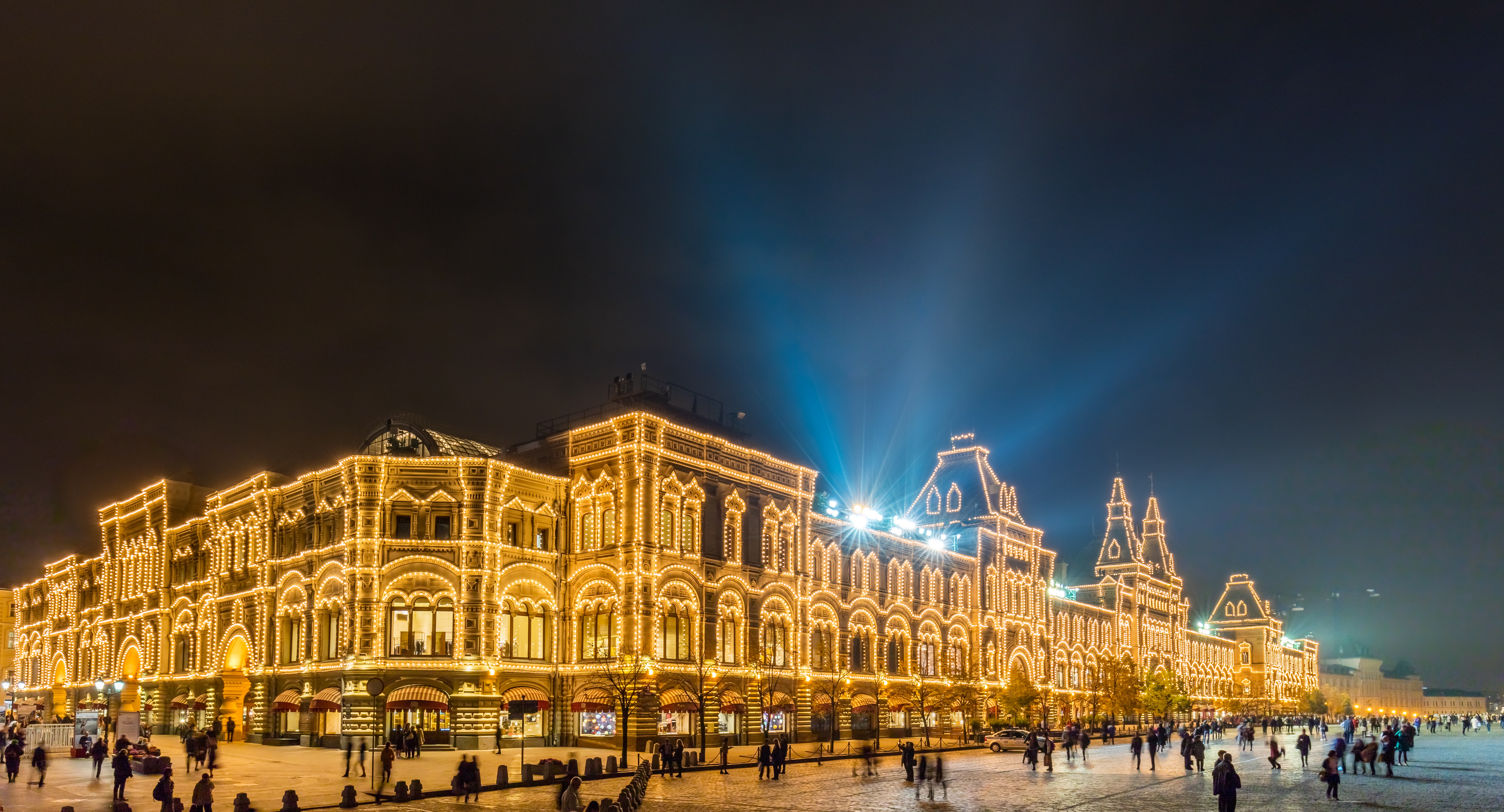
Upper Trading Rows by night

GUM (Russian: ГУМ (Note: The name is an abbreviation for Glavny Universalny Magazin (Главный универсальный магазин), meaning "Main Department Store". Before the store's privatization, the first letter stood instead for Gosudarstvenny (Государственный), meaning "State".)) is a shopping center in Moscow, Russia. It was also the main department store in many cities of the former Soviet Union; similarly named stores operated in some Soviet republics and in post-Soviet states.

The most famous GUM is the large store facing Red Square in the Kitai-gorod area – itself traditionally a mall of Moscow. Originally, and today again, the building functions as a shopping mall. During most of the Soviet period it was essentially a department store as there was one vendor: the Soviet State. Before the 1920s the location was known as the Upper Trading Rows (Russian: Верхние торговые ряды, romanized: Verkhniye torgovye ryady).

As of 2021, GUM carries over 100 different brands, and has cafes and restaurants inside the mall.

== Moscow GUM ==
=== Design and structure ===
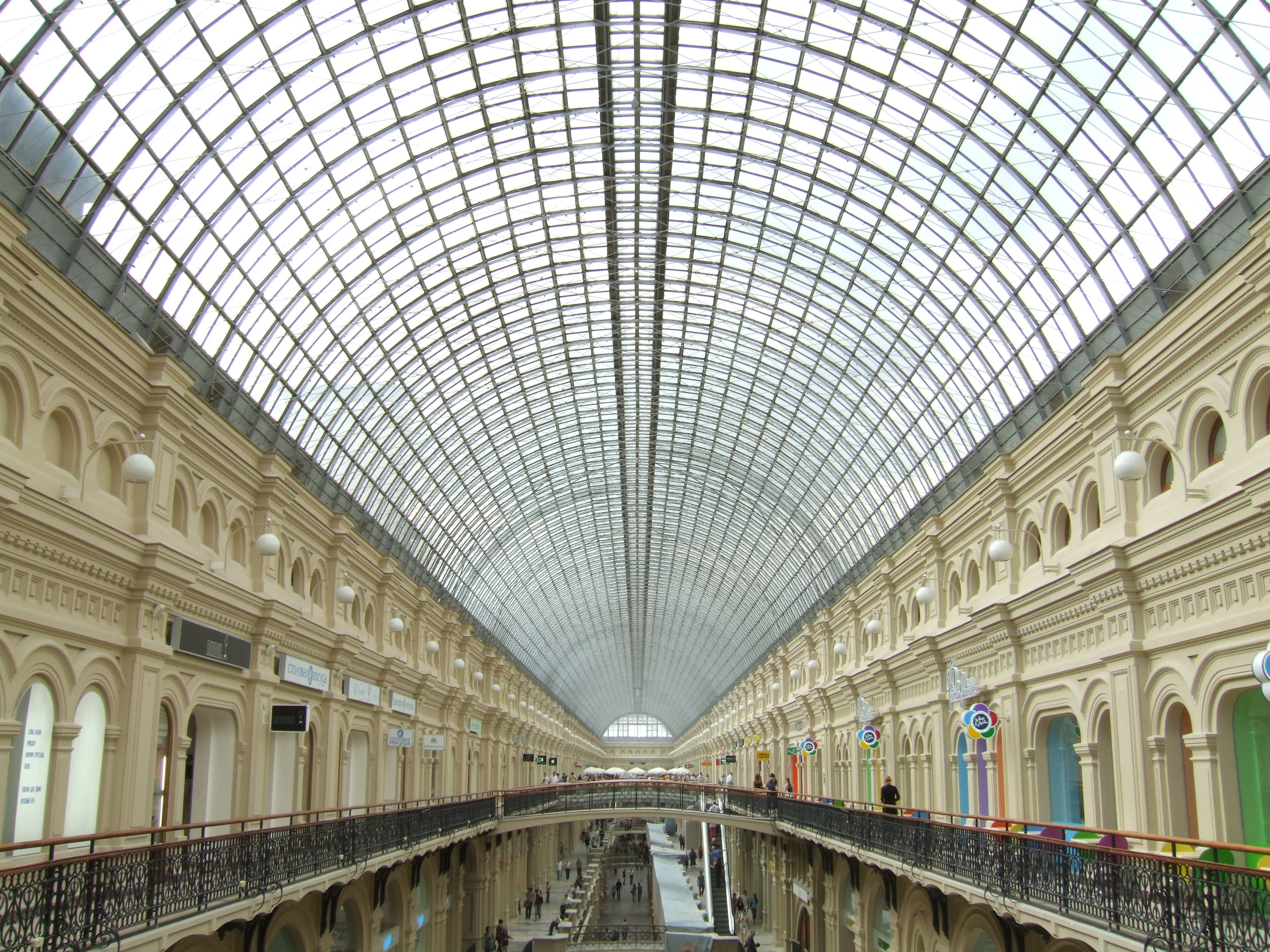
Structure of Shukhov's roof

With the façade extending for 242 m (794 ft) along the eastern side of Red Square, the Upper Trading Rows were built between 1890 and 1893 by Alexander Pomerantsev (responsible for architecture) and Vladimir Shukhov (responsible for engineering). The trapezoidal building features a combination of elements of Russian medieval architecture and a steel framework and glass roof, a similar style to the great 19th-century railway stations of London. William Craft Brumfield described the GUM building as "a tribute both to Shukhov's design and to the technical proficiency of Russian architecture toward the end of the 19th century".

The glass-roofed design made the building unique at the time of construction. The roof, the diameter of which is 14 m (46 ft), looks light, but it is a firm construction made of more than 50,000 metal pods (about 743 t (819 short tons)), capable of supporting snowfall accumulation. Illumination is provided by huge arched skylights of iron and glass, each weighing some 740 t (820 short tons) and containing in excess of 20,000 panes of glass. The facade is divided into several horizontal tiers, lined with red Finnish granite, Tarusa marble and limestone. Each arcade is on three levels, linked by walkways of reinforced concrete.

=== History ===
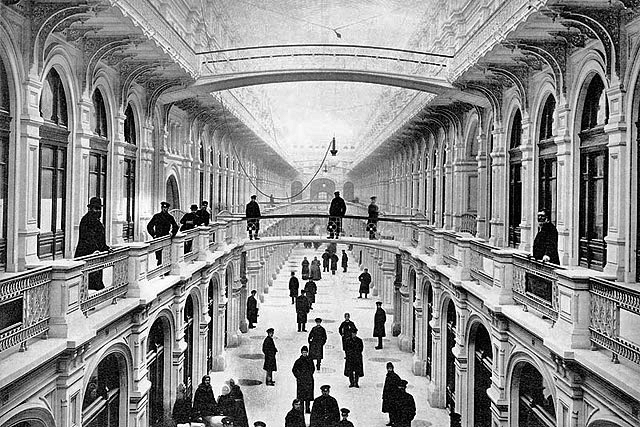
Inside the store in 1893: elongated shop galleries are bridged with innovative metal-and-glass vaults, designed by Vladimir Shukhov

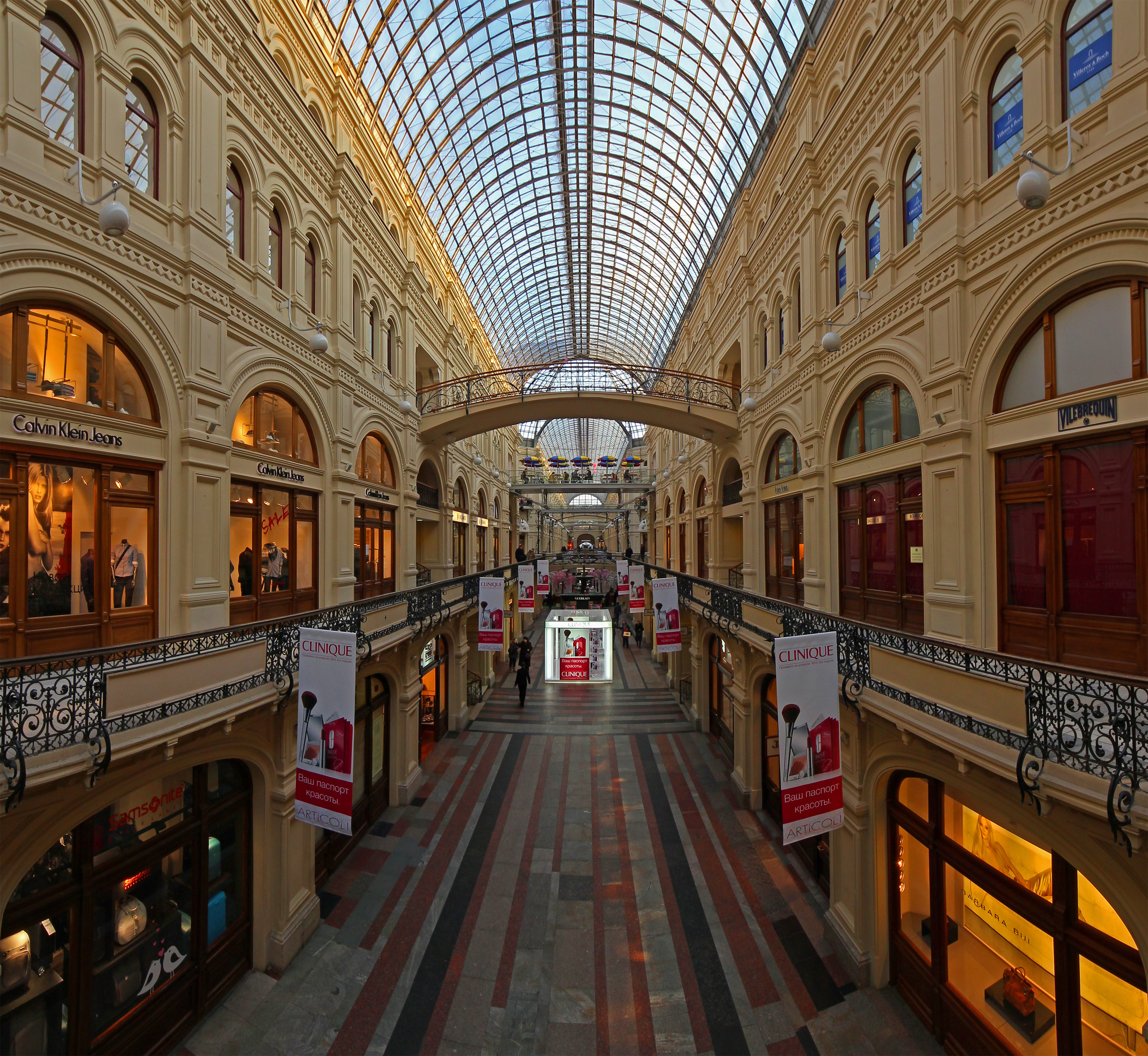
Inside view of the structure and finish applied to the building

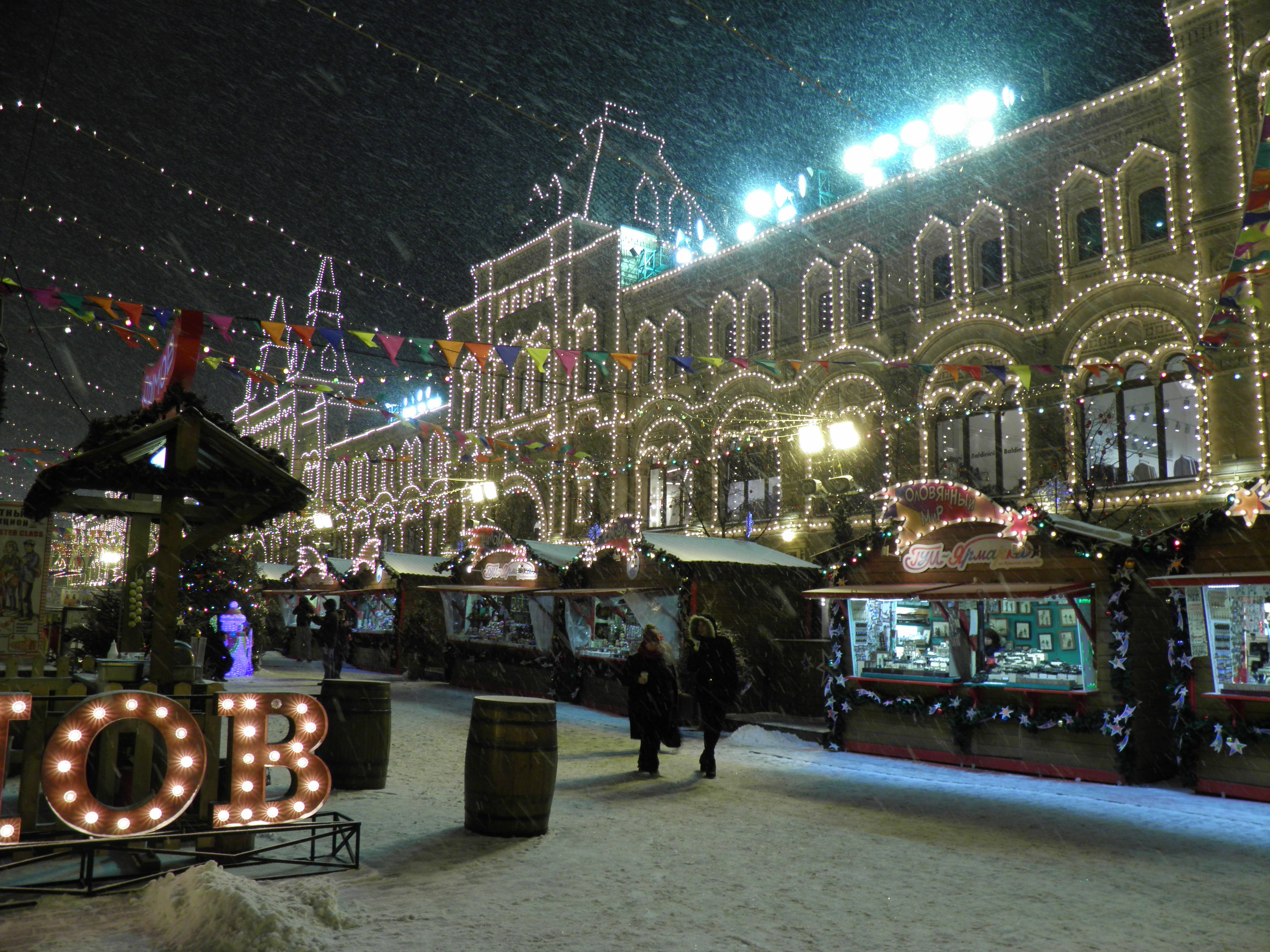
Decorations during Russian Christmas at the Red Square Christmas Market

Catherine II of Russia commissioned Giacomo Quarenghi, a Neoclassical architect from Italy, to design a huge trade area along the east side of Red Square. However, that building was lost to the 1812 Fire of Moscow and replaced by trading rows designed by Joseph Bove. In turn, the current structure opened in 1894, replacing Bove's.

By the time of the Russian Revolution of 1917, the building contained some 1,200 stores. After the Revolution, GUM was nationalized. During the NEP period (1921–28), however, GUM as a State Department Store operated as a model retail enterprise for consumers throughout Russia regardless of class, gender, and ethnicity. GUM's stores were used to further Bolshevik goals of rebuilding private enterprise along socialist lines and "democratizing consumption for workers and peasants nationwide". In the end, GUM's efforts to build communism through consumerism were unsuccessful and arguably "only succeeded in alienating consumers from state stores and instituting a culture of complaint and entitlement".

GUM continued to be used as a department store until Joseph Stalin converted it into office space in 1928 for the committee in charge of his first Five Year Plan. After the suicide of Stalin's wife Nadezhda in 1932, the GUM was used briefly to display her body.

After reopening as a department store in 1953, GUM became one of the few stores in the Soviet Union that did not have shortages of consumer goods, and the queues of shoppers were long, often extending entirely across Red Square.

Several times during the 1960s and 1970s, the Second Secretary of the Communist Party Mikhail Suslov, who hated having a department store facing Lenin's Mausoleum, tried to convert GUM into an exhibition hall and museum showcasing the achievements of the Soviet Union and Communism, without the knowledge of General Secretary Leonid Brezhnev. Each time, however, Brezhnev was tipped off and put a stop to such plans.

At the end of the Soviet era, GUM was partially in 1990, then fully in 1992 privatized, and it had a number of owners before it ended up being owned by the supermarket company Perekrestok. In May 2005, a 50.25% interest was sold to Bosco di Ciliegi, a Russian luxury goods distributor and boutique operator. As a private shopping mall, it was renamed in such a fashion that it could maintain its old acronym. Although it is no longer state-owned, the abbreviation "GUM" has been retained – however, the first word Gosudarstvenny ('State') has been replaced with Glavny ('Main'): GUM is now an abbreviation for "Main Universal Store" – and is used alongside its original name, "Upper Trading Rows".

== See also ==
- TsUM, another large department store in Moscow.
- Passage, a department store in St. Petersburg, Russia.

== Sources ==
- Brumfield, William Craft (1991) The Origins of Modernism in Russian Architecture, University of California Press, Berkeley, Los Angeles, Oxford, ISBN 0-520-06929-3
- English, Elizabeth Cooper (2000). ""Arkhitektura i mnimosti": The origins of Soviet avant-garde rationalist architecture in the Russian mystical-philosophical and mathematical intellectual tradition". University of Pennsylvania ScholarlyCommons. Archived from the original on June 24, 2006.
- Hilton, Marjorie L. (2004). "Retailing the Revolution: The State Department Store (GUM) and Soviet Society in the 1920s". Journal of Social History, (Oxford University Press) 37 (4): 939–964; 1127. ISSN 0022-4529
- Rainer Graefe, Jos Tomlow: "Vladimir G. Suchov 1853–1939. Die Kunst der sparsamen Konstruktion." 192 S., Deutsche Verlags-Anstalt, Stuttgart, 1990, ISBN 3-421-02984-9
