= Ulvi Hasanli =

Azerbaijani journalist

- Ülvi Həsənli
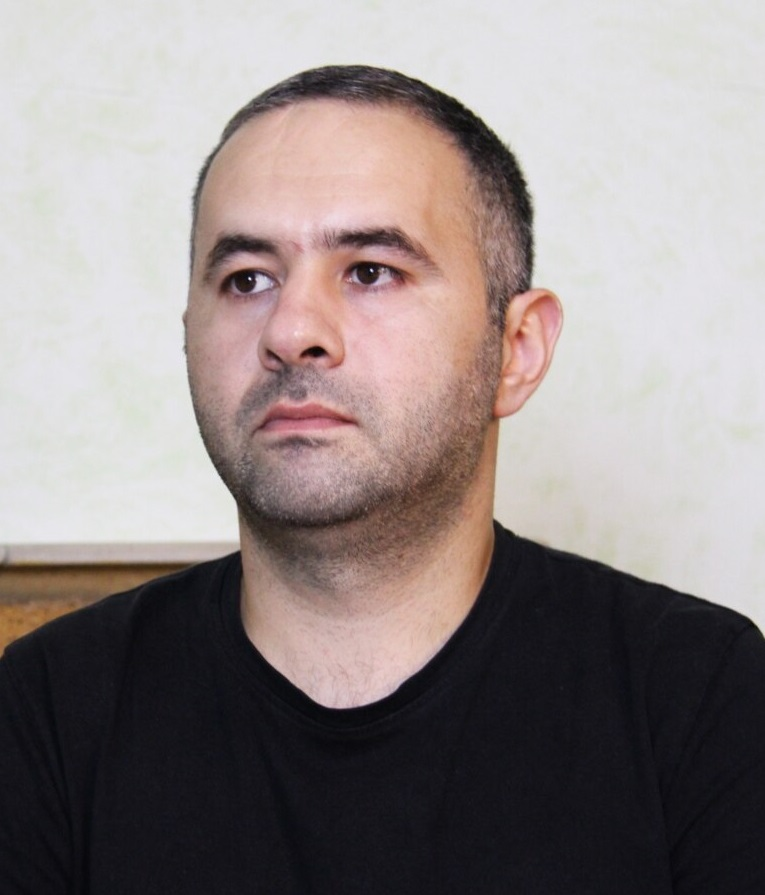
- Ulvi Hasanli in 2021
- Born: 10 August 1987 (age 39); Ganja, Azerbaijan
- Citizenship: Azerbaijan
- Education: Azerbaijan Tourism and Management University
- Occupations: journalist, political prisoner
- Years active: 2005–present

Ulvi Hasanli (full name: Ulvi Fakhraddin oglu Hasanov, Azerbaijani: Ülvi Fəxrəddin oğlu Həsənov; born; August 10, 1987, Ganja) — Azerbaijani political activist, media professional, political prisoner, and the director of Abzas Media.

He has been involved in political and civic processes since 2005. Over the years, he served as: Chairman of the youth movement Wave (Dalğa) (2006–2007), Co-founder and chairman of the organization Free Youth (Azad Gəncliк) (2011–2013), Member of the board of the NIDA Civic Movement (2014–2015, 2017–2018, and 2019–2020). Throughout his political activity, Hasanli has been subjected to continuous persecution by the Azerbaijani authorities. He repeatedly organized and participated in rallies, protests, and pickets. In October 2012, he was sentenced to 7 days of administrative detention, and in September 2013, to 15 days of detention. The European Court of Human Rights (ECHR) ruled that both arrests were politically motivated. In 2017, Hasanli was detained by military police and illegally conscripted into military service.

In 2016, he co-founded Abzas Media. Since 2022, he has been actively engaged in journalism as the outlet’s director. Abzas Media is known for its investigative reporting into the business activities of government officials, members of parliament, and state-affiliated figures, particularly regarding tender contracts and corruption during reconstruction works in Karabakh after 2020.

Ulvi Hasanli was detained by police in the morning of 20 November 2023. After being interrogated at the Main Police Department of Baku, he was charged under Article 206.3.2 of the Criminal Code of Azerbaijan (smuggling committed by a group of persons). On 21 November 2023, by decision of the Khatai District Court, he was placed under arrest. On 16 August 2024, the charges in the criminal case investigated by the Main Police Department of Baku were aggravated. Hasanli and other defendants were charged under seven articles of the Criminal Code of Azerbaijan: Articles 192.3.2, 193-1.3.1, 193-1.3.2, 206.4, 320.1, and 320.2. These charges include: illegal entrepreneurship generating large income, money laundering committed by an organized group, smuggling committed by an organized group, forgery of documents and use of forged documents.

Numerous local and international human rights organizations condemned the arrest of Ulvi Hasanli, calling it politically motivated, and urged the Azerbaijani authorities to immediately release him.

On 20 June 2025, the Baku Serious Crimes Court sentenced him to 9 years of imprisonment.

== Early life ==
Ulvi Fakhraddin oglu Hasanli was born on 10 August 1987 in the city of Kirovabad (now Ganja).

In 2005, he graduated from secondary school No. 29 named after K. Ushinsky in Ganja and enrolled in the Azerbaijan State Oil Academy. In 2006, he was expelled from the academy due to his socio-political activity.

From 2008 to 2013, he studied at the Azerbaijan Tourism and Management University.

== Political activity ==
Hasanli became involved in civic activism at a young age. In 2005, he joined the youth movement Dalğa (Wave). In 2006, he was elected chairman of the movement and held this position until 2007.

On 22 July 2007, he organized a youth protest titled "Let’s Support Free Press", which consisted of mass newspaper reading and was peaceful in nature. The aim was to draw public attention to the importance of supporting independent media in Azerbaijan. The protest was dispersed by police.

In January 2011, Hasanli became a co-founder and chairman of Free Youth (Azad Gənclik). He resigned from this position in September 2013.

In June 2013, he became a member of the National Council of Democratic Forces, established ahead of the presidential elections.

In September 2013, he joined the NIDA Civic Movement and was elected to its board in 2014, serving until February 2015, and later again in 2017–2018 and 2019–2020.

In May 2022, Hasanli was a member of the organizing committee of the protest "We Do Not Want a Criminal State!", held on 14 May 2022 at Fountain Square. Several hours before the protest, he was detained by police and released in the evening.

In 2022, he left the NIDA movement due to his active journalistic work.

In August 2025, Hasanli was announced as one of three nominees for the Václav Havel Human Rights Prize.

== Administrative arrests (2012 and 2013) ==
On 20 October 2012, Ulvi Hasanli was detained by police while participating in a protest titled “Dissolve the Parliament!”, held at Fountain Square and demanding the dissolution of the parliament. By decision of the Sabail District Court, Hasanli was sentenced to 7 days of administrative detention. He was released on 27 October 2012. On 20 July 2017, the European Court of Human Rights delivered its judgment on the complaint filed against the decision of the Sabail District Court regarding Hasanli’s arrest in October 2012. The Court found violations of: Article 5 (right to liberty and security), Article 6 (right to a fair trial), and Article 11 (freedom of assembly) of the European Convention on Human Rights and ordered the Azerbaijani authorities to pay Hasanli €10,000 in compensation for non-pecuniary damage.

On 12 January 2013, Hasanli was detained by police during a protest against non-combat deaths in the army, held at Fountain Square. After a brief detention at the Sabail district police station, he was released the same evening and fined 600 manats under Article 298 of the Code of Administrative Offences. Hasanli stated that participation in the protest did not constitute an administrative offence and therefore refused to pay the fine. On 15 February, the Nizami District Court confiscated a mobile phone and a laptop allegedly belonging to Hasanli. He stated that the items did not belong to him and that bailiffs seized them by force. He announced his intention to challenge this decision in court. Later, the court replaced the fine with 200 hours of community service.

On 14 July 2013, at approximately 15:30, Hasanli was detained near the exit of Nizami metro station, close to the Baku Metro Police Department. According to Hasanli, two men in civilian clothes approached them, identified themselves as police officers, and claimed they were behaving “suspiciously.” Around 19:00, Hasanli and two other activists — Majid Marjanli and Kenan Gasimli — were taken from the Metro Police Department to an unknown location. On 15 July, the Sabail District Court of Baku sentenced Hasanli, Marjanli, and Gasimli to 15 days of administrative arrest on charges of disobeying police orders. According to their lawyer, the court delivered the ruling without waiting for defense attorneys to arrive. Later that day, the Ministry of Internal Affairs confirmed the arrests, stating that the activists had been detained for failure to comply with lawful police demands and that a protocol had been drawn up under Article 310.1 of the Code of Administrative Offences.

According to activists from NIDA and Free Youth, the arrests were connected to the distribution of stickers across the city and metro bearing slogans such as: “You are the source of power”, “Do not fear the authorities”, “Resist the authorities” and “Change the government”. On 19 July, the Baku Court of Appeal upheld the 15-day administrative detention. On 7 October 2021, the European Court of Human Rights ruled on Hasanli’s complaint regarding his July 2013 arrest, finding violations of: Article 6 (right to a fair trial), and Article 10 (freedom of expression). The Court ordered the Azerbaijani authorities to pay Hasanli €5,850 in compensation.

On 9 September 2020, Hasanli was detained during a protest demanding the release of Tofig Yagublu. He spent several hours at a police station and was later released.

== Participation in Elections (2015 and 2020) ==
A head of the parliamentary elections scheduled for 1 November 2015, the NIDA Civic Movement discussed nominating Ulvi Hasanli as a candidate. Hasanli stated that participation in the elections would contribute to increased civic engagement in Azerbaijan. NIDA nominated Hasanli as its candidate in the Binagadi Second Electoral District No. 9. However, the Central Election Commission and the district election commission obstructed the registration of his candidacy. According to a statement by NIDA, pressure was exerted on citizens in the Rəsulzadə settlement, who had signed in support of Hasanli’s candidacy, forcing them to withdraw their signatures.

On 12 October 2015, the district election commission officially refused to register Hasanli as a candidate. The decision stated that out of 544 voter signatures, registration was denied based on: Written statements from 73 individuals claiming they had been deceived, and 61 signatures declared invalid due to authenticity concerns. Hasanli appealed the decision to the Central Election Commission (CEC). On 13 October 2015, the CEC upheld the decision, and Hasanli’s candidacy was not registered. He subsequently challenged the CEC decision in court.

In December 2019, the Azerbaijani parliament was dissolved, and snap parliamentary elections were scheduled for February 2020.

On 27 December 2019, the “Movement” Electoral Bloc was established, with Hasanli participating in its creation. The bloc included the D18 Movement, the NIDA Civic Movement, and former members of the REAL Party. The bloc nominated Hasanli in the Binagadi Second Electoral District No. 9. The election in this district involved four main candidates, including a representative of the ruling New Azerbaijan Party.

According to official results, Hasanli finished ninth, receiving 446 votes (2.60%).

== Detention and Illegal Military Conscription (2017) ==
In October 2017, Ulvi Hasanli was detained by military police and sent to a military unit in the Barda district. Hasanli had undergone medical examinations at the State Service for Mobilization and Conscription in September 2016 and early 2017. Due to kidney disease and rheumatism, he was granted a deferment from military service until 2019. In early October 2017, Hasanli received another summons and underwent a new medical examination. An ultrasound examination revealed kidney stones and inflammation, and additional tests were prescribed. After a repeated ultrasound on 25 October, he was informed that his “kidneys were healthy.” On 26 October, Hasanli was sent for examination to a Cardiology Hospital, after which military police transported him to the military commissariat. There, written statements were taken from him, and he was sent to serve in a military unit located in a frontline zone, according to a statement by the NIDA Civic Movement.

Hasanli’s lawyer Elchin Sadigov and human rights defender Elshan Hasanov stated that the forced conscription was linked to his civic activism. Sadigov emphasized that conscripting a person with serious health problems is unlawful and that only evasion of military service may result in criminal liability. Hasanli had not evaded service; his health condition had not allowed him to serve. Legal expert and lawyer Yalchin Imanov noted that military service involves heavy physical strain and that individuals with health problems are usually granted deferments or exempted from service altogether.

On 1 November 2017, the Baku Military Court accepted a complaint regarding Hasanli’s forced conscription under judicial review procedures. The defense requested recognition of the conscription as unlawful, Hasanli’s personal participation in the proceedings, and an independent medical examination. The complaint also alleged torture, stating that forcibly conscripting a seriously ill person amounted to inhuman treatment. On 3 November, the court declined to consider the case on the merits and recommended filing a complaint with the Military Prosecutor’s Office. On 13 November, the Baku Court of Appeal, chaired by Judge Elshad Shamayev, dismissed the appeal against Hasanli’s forced conscription.

== Journalistic Activity ==
In 2016, Ulvi Hasanli and a group of young civil society representatives founded the investigative media outlet Abzas Media.

Since 2022, Abzas Media has become widely known for its anti-corruption investigations and coverage of issues of significant public importance. On 14 March 2021, Hasanli and journalist Mehman Huseynov were detained by police in the Absheron district while returning from filming. They had been conducting aerial drone filming for a journalistic investigation. According to Huseynov, police officers blocked their vehicle, citing instructions from superiors. Lawyer Fuad Aghayev was involved in their defense. The journalists were taken to the Absheron District Police Department, interrogated, and released around 17:30, while their drone was confiscated. Huseynov later reported that after questioning, the journalists were blindfolded and transported to an unknown location before being released near Ganjlik metro station.

On 23 June 2023, Hasanli was summoned to the Binagadi District Police Department after posting photographs on Facebook of police officers who had detained journalists Nargiz Absalamova, Nigar Mubariz, and Elsever Muradzade while they were covering protests in the village of Söyüdlü, Gadabay. Police demanded that Hasanli delete the post. He refused and was released after four hours. Later that same evening, security officers at the U.S. Embassy in Baku escorted Hasanli off embassy premises while he was livestreaming a protest by three Azerbaijani activists related to the Soyudlu events. Outside the embassy, Hasanli was detained again and taken to Nasimi District Police Station No. 21. Police demanded deletion of photos and videos, but since Hasanli did not have his phone with him, he was released after one hour.

== Arrest and Trial (2023–2025) ==
On 20 November 2023, Ulvi Hasanli was detained. On 30 November, Abzas Media’s editor-in-chief Sevinj Vagifgizi reported that Hasanli was supposed to leave the country but did not board his flight. According to her statement, Hasanli left home at 04:30 to go to the airport but disappeared. She linked his detention to Abzas Media’s investigations into the business activities of family members of high-ranking officials.

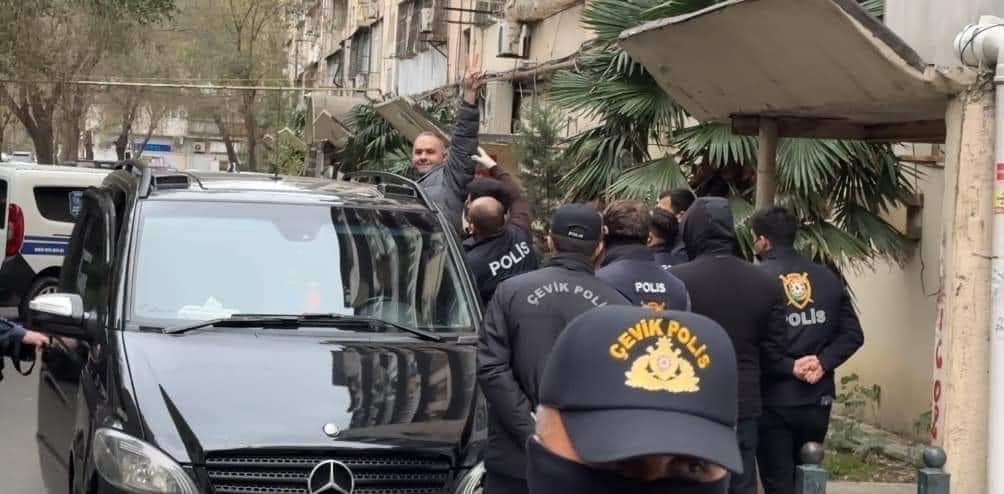
Ulvi Hasanli is escorted to the Baku City Police Department by a police convoy following a search of his home (November 20, 2023)

Later that morning, police conducted a search of the Abzas Media office. Lawyer Zibeyda Sadigova stated that Hasanli had been detained but that journalists were not allowed into the office during the search. In the evening, it became known that Hasanli was accused of smuggling foreign currency based on the discovery of €40,000 in the editorial office. Hasanli and Abzas Media staff denied ownership of the money and stated that the charges were retaliation for their investigative reporting.

Hasanli was taken to the Main Police Department of Baku, where late on 20 November he was formally charged under Article 206.3.2 of the Criminal Code (currency smuggling by a group of persons acting in collusion). Lawyer Sadigova stated that Hasanli did not plead guilty and described the charges as unfounded. She also reported that Hasanli had visible injuries under his eye and told her that he had been beaten. The defense demanded an investigation into allegations of ill-treatment.

On the night of 20–21 November 2023, Sevinj Vagifgizi, editor-in-chief of Abzas Media, was also detained at Heydar Aliyev International Airport upon returning to Azerbaijan. A search was conducted at her home, after which she was taken to the Main Police Department of Baku. She also linked her detention to her professional journalistic activity. On 21 November, Vagifgizi was formally charged with currency smuggling.

On November 21, 2023, the Khatai District Court considered the investigative body's motion to impose a preventive measure against Ulvi Hasanli. Judge Sulhana Hajiyeva ordered his pre-trial detention for four months, until March 20, 2024. Hasanli’s lawyer Zibeyda Sadigova called the arrest unlawful and unsubstantiated. She stated that the only evidence presented by the investigation was the €40,000 found in the Abzas Media office, which Hasanli denied owning. No evidence was presented that the money had been transported into Azerbaijan illegally. According to the defense, the charges were directly connected to Hasanli’s investigative journalism. Sadigova also informed the court that Hasanli had complained of violence by law enforcement officers. The judge decided to forward his complaint to the Baku City Prosecutor’s Office for investigation. After the hearing, Hasanli was transferred to the Baku Pre-Trial Detention Center (Zabrat). On 27 November 2023, the Baku Court of Appeal upheld the decision to keep Hasanli in custody. On 16 December 2023 and 10 January 2024, the Khatai District Court refused to place Hasanli under house arrest.

During the first three months of his detention, Hasanli was denied contact with his family and lawyers. Multiple court hearings were held in relation to these restrictions. All limitations were lifted only on 20 February 2024.

On 14 March 2024, the Khatai District Court extended Hasanli’s detention for the second time. Judge Rafael Sadikhov extended the detention by 2 months and 29 days, until 19 June 2024. The investigation cited the need for “additional procedural actions.” The defense argued that the investigation had already had sufficient time and that Hasanli could be released and summoned if necessary. On 27 March, the Baku Court of Appeal rejected the defense’s appeal against the extension. On 9 May, the court again refused to place Hasanli under house arrest, and on 6 June, refused to release him on bail.

On 12 June 2024, the Khatai District Court extended Hasanli’s detention for the third time, prolonging it by three months, until 19 September 2024, by decision of Judge Fuad Akhundov. On 3 July, the court once again refused to transfer Hasanli to house arrest.

On 19 August 2024, the charges in the criminal case investigated by the Main Police Department of Baku were significantly aggravated. Hasanli and other defendants were charged under seven articles of the Criminal Code of Azerbaijan, including: illegal entrepreneurship generating large income, money laundering by an organized group, smuggling by an organized group, forgery of documents and use of forged documents.

On 7 September 2024, the Khatai District Court extended Hasanli’s detention for the fourth time, until 19 December 2024, by decision of Judge Sahiba Hajiyeva.

On 17 December 2024, the trial of the leaders and journalists of Abzas Media, as well as Hafiz Babali and Radio Free Europe/Radio Liberty journalist Farid Mehralizade, began. During the hearings, Hasanli denied all charges and stated that his arrest was directly related to his journalistic activity. All defense motions requesting his release under house arrest were rejected. The case was heard by a panel of judges chaired by Rasim Sadikhov, with judges Leyla Asgarova-Mammadova and Novruz Karimov.

On 20 May 2025, prosecutor Rauf Malishov requested that the court sentence Hasanli to 12 years of imprisonment.

On 20 June 2025, the Baku Serious Crimes Court sentenced Ulvi Hasanli to 9 years in prison.

In August 2025, the Baku Court of Appeal began reviewing appeals filed by Hasanli and other defendants. By decision of Judge Zafar Ahmadov dated 9 September 2025, the sentence was upheld.

== International Reaction ==
International human rights organizations — including Amnesty International, Human Rights Watch, Reporters Without Borders, the Committee to Protect Journalists, the European Federation of Journalists, the Norwegian Helsinki Committee, Freedom Now, the United States Department of State, and others — condemned Hasanli’s arrest and called for his immediate release.

On 22 November, rapporteurs of the Parliamentary Assembly of the Council of Europe (PACE) demanded that Azerbaijani authorities release Hasanli.

On 26 November, the EU Special Representative for Human Rights, Eamon Gilmore, called on Azerbaijani authorities to stop the persecution of journalists. The same day, the International Federation for Human Rights (FIDH) also demanded the release of Hasanli and Vagifgizi.

== Personal life ==
In 2015, Ulvi Hasanli married Rubaba Guliyeva. In 2023, their daughter Suad was born.

In November 2023, Rubaba Guliyeva was interrogated as a witness in the criminal case against the leadership and journalists of Abzas Media. Since then, she has been officially banned from leaving the country.

== See also ==
- Human rights in Azerbaijan
- Media freedom in Azerbaijan
