= Abzas Media =

Azerbaijan non-profit media outlet

- Website type: News website
- Available in: Azerbaijani, English
- Owner: Ulvi Hasanli
- Creator: Ulvi Hasanli
- Editor: Sevinj Vagifgizi (editor-in-chief)
- Website: abzas.org
- Commercial: No
- Registration: None
- Launched: 6 November 2016; 9 years ago
- Current status: Active

Abzas Media is a non-profit independent media outlet in Azerbaijan. It was founded in 2016 and focused on news and investigations in domestic politics, especially involving corruption and human rights in Azerbaijan.

The outlet became known internationally in November 2023 when it became a target of the ongoing crackdown by the Ilham Aliyev regime on the civil society, journalists and human rights activists in Azerbaijan. The crackdown on Abzas Media has been widely seen by the international community as a devastating attack on the freedom of press and freedom of speech in the country. The journalists at Abzas Media have been arrested on charges that are considered dubious by various human rights organizations. Abzas Media was also mentioned in a resolution by the European Parliament, condemning the ongoing human rights violations in the country.

On 20 June 2025, six journalists from Abzas Media were sentenced to long prison sentences in Azerbaijan.

== History ==
Abzas Media was founded in 2016 by a group of civil activists. Ulvi Hasanli was one of them and has been the head of the organization since its inception. He aimed to expose the detrimental effects of corruption on society, highlighting how it increases the power imbalances and socio-economic inequality in post-Soviet Azerbaijan. Before his work at Abzas Media, Hasanli led several pro-democracy youth organizations, including Dalga Youth Movement, the Free Youth Movement, and the NIDA Youth Movement, all of which strive to promote democratic and social change in Azerbaijan.

Sevinj Vagifqizi, also a human rights defender and journalist, is the editor-in-chief of Abzas Media. She has played a significant role in uncovering high-level corruption, including allegations involving senior officials and the President Aliyev's family. Vaqifqizi previously worked for nine years as a local journalist with Meydan TV, an independent media outlet operating in exile.

== Investigation ==
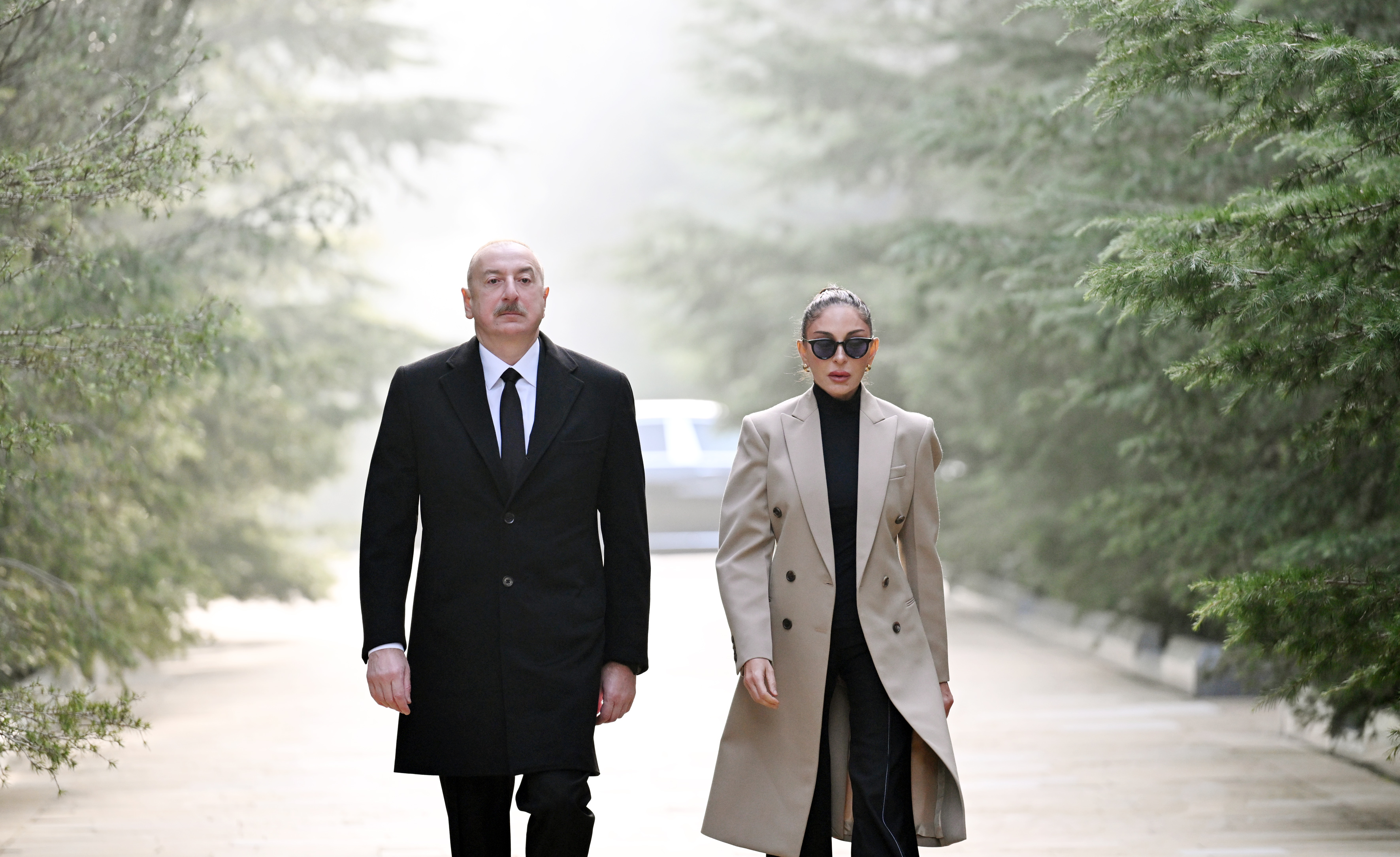
Azerbaijani dictator Ilham Aliyev and his wife Mehriban Aliyeva have been described as the "embodiment of nepotism and kleptocracy" in Azerbaijan.

Between 2022 and 2023, AbzasMedia published investigations related to family members of the President of Azerbaijan, Ilham Aliyev, the Minister of Foreign Affairs, Jeyhun Bayramov, the Deputy Head of the Special State Protection Service, Baylar Eyyubov, and the Head of the State Security Service, Ali Naghiyev. These investigations also included materials about tenders associated with the Heydar Aliyev Foundation and PASHA Holding.

Additionally, in the series "Uninvestigated Crimes," reports were published about crimes involving the former head of the subway system, Tagi Ahmadov, the former head of the Baku Slavic University, Nurlana Aliyeva, the former commander of the Army Corps, Hikmat Hasanov, the former mayor, Hajibala Abutalybov, the former deputy, Elmira Akhundova, the former minister, Huseyngulu Baghirov, and the current Minister of Finance, Samir Sharifov, along with Lieutenant General Mais Barkhudarov, former MP Ziyad Samadzadeh, the Minister of Labor and Social Protection, Sahil Babayev, and Lieutenant General, former Chief of the General Staff of the Armed Forces of the Republic of Azerbaijan, Najmeddin Sadikov.

Furthermore, AbzasMedia actively participated in covering the "Söyüdlü incident", in the Azerbaijani village of Söyüdlü, Gadabay, preparing materials based on interviews with local residents, activists, and lawyers. Journalist Nargiz Absalamova faced police intervention while reporting on a protest held by Soyudlu village residents. She was detained along with her colleague, her phone was confiscated, and she was forcibly removed from the village.

== Arrests and detentions ==
On 20 November 2023, at around 7:00 AM, Ulvi Hasanli, the director of AbzasMedia, was detained near his home while heading to the airport for a trip abroad. Hasanli was taken to the Main Police Department of Baku City and searches were conducted at his residence and the AbzasMedia's office. Zibeyda Sadigova, Hasanli's lawyer, stated that during the five-hour search at the office, police reported finding €40,000. During the search process, a red bruise was observed under Ulvi Hasanli's eye. He informed journalists that the injury was caused by a punch from police officers during his detention. Hasanli also reported that he was subjected to inhumane treatment and torture at the Main Police Department of Baku City, where he claimed to have been punched repeatedly. He was charged under Article 206.3.2 of the Criminal Code (smuggling on preliminary arrangement by group of persons), and a pretrial detention measure was imposed against him.

Later, AbzasMedia's editor-in-chief, Sevinj Vagifqizi, was detained by police at the Heydar Aliyev International Airport. On the same day, her residence was searched. Elchin Sadigov, who represents Sevinj Vagifqizi as her lawyer, stated that no illegal items were found during the search. Despite this, a criminal case was initiated against her under Article 206.3.2 of the Criminal Code (smuggling on preliminary arrangement by group of persons). On 21 November, the Khatai District Court imposed pretrial detention on Sevinj Vagifqizi.

On 23 November, the Khatai District Court imposed pretrial detention on Abzas Media's assistant director, Mahammad Kekalov.

In November 2023, after the board and employees of Abzas Media were arrested on smuggling charges, Nargiz Absalamova was also questioned as a witness in the same case on 23 November at the Main Police Department of Baku City. A week later, on 30 November, she was summoned again as a witness to the same department but was detained as a suspect. She was charged under the same article as the Abzas Media's board —Article 206.3.2 of the Criminal Code (smuggling on preliminary arrangement by group of persons). On 1 December, the Khatai District Court imposed pretrial detention on Nargiz Absalamova.

Elnara Gasimova was questioned twice as a witness in connection with the AbzasMedia case—on 24 November 2023, and 13 January 2024. During the most recent summons, on 13 January 2024, she was detained as a suspect. On 15 January 2024, she was charged as a defendant under Article 206.3.2 of the Criminal Code, and the charges outlined in that article were formally brought against her. On the same day, the Khatai District Court of Baku issued a ruling imposing pretrial detention on her.

After the detention of AbzasMedia journalists Hafiz Babali was summoned to the Main Police Department of Baku City as a witness. On 13 December, Babali was taken into custody by the police, and a search was conducted at his residence by eight police officers alongside an investigator from the Main Police Department of Baku City. Like other AbzasMedia journalists, a criminal case was initiated against him under Article 206.3.2 of the Criminal Code (smuggling on preliminary arrangement by group of persons).

On 20 June 2025, Abzas Media's director Ulvi Hasanli, editor-in-chief Sevinj Vagifgizi and investigative reporter Hafiz Babali were sentenced to nine years in prison. Journalists Nargiz Absalamova and Elnara Gasimova were sentenced to eight years in prison, while the outlet's deputy director Mahammad Kekalov was sentenced to seven and a half years. Independent economist Farid Mehralizade, who gave interviews to Abzas Media, was sentenced to 9 years in prison. Marie Struthers, Amnesty International’s Eastern Europe and Central Asia Director, said: "By pressing fabricated economic charges against journalists who exposed high-level corruption, the Azerbaijani authorities are sending a chilling message to anyone in the country who dares to challenge them. ... The political repression in Azerbaijan today is staggering, yet we lack a united, principled stand against it from the international community, in defence of human rights. In stark contrast, major actors like the European Union persist in actively courting President Ilham Aliyev in search of lucrative gas deals."
