= Sevinj Vagifgizi =

Azerbaijani journalist

- Sevinc Vaqifqızı
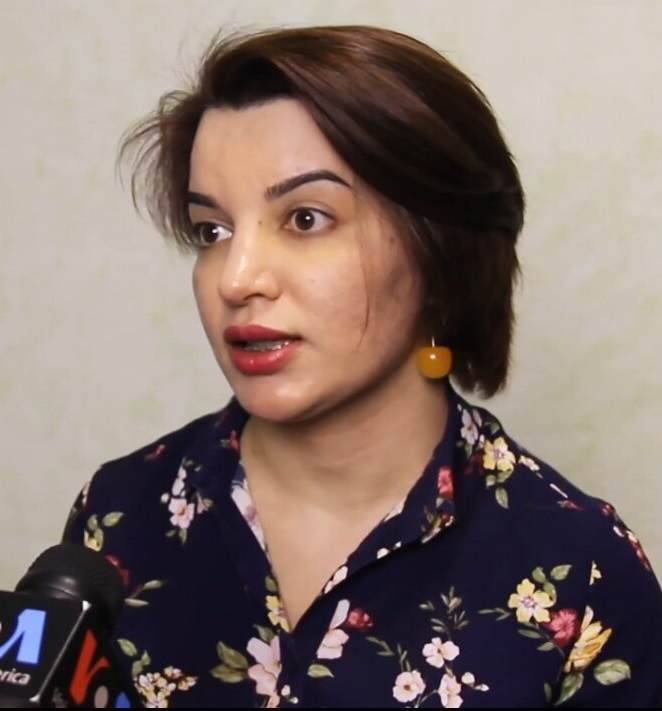
- Sevinj Vagifgizi in 2021
- Born: July 5, 1989 (age 37); Fuzuli District, Azerbaijan
- Citizenship: Azerbaijan
- Education: Baku State University
- Occupations: Journalist, political prisoner
- Years active: 2009–present
- Awards: Nargiz Award (2023); United States Department of State's Anti-Corruption Champion Award (2024); Reporters Without Borders's Courage Award (2025); French Ministry for Europe and Foreign Affairs's Anna Politkovskaya–Arman Soldin Award for Courage in Journalism (2026)

Sevinj Vagifgizi (full name: Sevinj Vagif gizi Abbasova, Azerbaijani: Sevinc Vaqifqızı Abbasova; born; July 5, 1989, Fuzuli District) is an Azerbaijani journalist and political prisoner. Since September 2022, she has served as the editor-in-chief of the media platform Abzas Media.

She has been active in journalism since 2009. Over the course of her career, she has worked with the newspapers Bizim Yol and Azadlıq, the television channel Meydan TV, and the media platform Abzas Media. Throughout her professional career, she has repeatedly faced persecution. In 2015, a criminal investigation was launched against several executives of Meydan TV, during which she was questioned and banned from leaving the country for four years. In 2020, the European Court of Human Rights ruled that this travel ban was unlawful.

Sevinj Vagifgizi was in Istanbul, Turkey, on November 20, 2023, the day when the director of Abzas Media, Ulvi Hasanli, was subjected to criminal prosecution. Despite being aware of her impending arrest, she returned to Baku on the evening of November 21, 2023. She was detained by police at Heydar Aliyev International Airport and taken to the Main Police Department of Baku. After being questioned, she was charged under Article 206.3.2 of the Criminal Code of Azerbaijan (smuggling committed by a group of persons). On November 21, 2023, she was arrested by a decision of the Khatai District Court. On August 16, 2024, the charges in the criminal case under investigation by the Main Police Department of Baku were aggravated. Sevinj Vagifgizi and other defendants were charged under seven articles of the Criminal Code, including Articles 192.3.2, 193–1.3.1, 193–1.3.2, 206.4, 320.1, and 320.2. These charges included illegal entrepreneurship resulting in large-scale income; money laundering committed by an organized group; smuggling committed by an organized group; forgery of documents; and the use of forged documents.

A number of local and international human rights organizations condemned the arrest of Sevinj Vagifgizi, describing it as politically motivated, and called on the Azerbaijani authorities to immediately release her.

On June 20, 2025, the Baku Serious Crimes Court sentenced her to nine years of imprisonment.

From November 2023 to September 2025, she was held at the Baku Pre-trial detention Center in Zabrat. Since September 2025, she has been serving her sentence at the Lankaran Penitentiary Complex in the city of Lankaran.

== Early life ==
Sevinj Vagif gizi Abbasova was born on July 5ç 1989 in the Fuzuli District. Following the occupation of the Fizuli District during the First Nagorno-Karabakh War in August 1993, she and her family became internally displaced persons and settled in Baku.

From 1995 to 2006, she studied at secondary school No. 297 named after E. Aliyev in the Binagadi District of Baku. From 2006 to 2010, she studied journalism at Baku State University.

== Journalistic career ==
Sevinj Vagifgizi began working as a journalist during her student years. From 2009 to 2013, she worked for the newspaper Bizim Yol; from 2012 to 2013, for Azadlıq; and in 2013 she began working as a video reporter for Meydan TV.

In September 2022, she was appointed editor-in-chief of Abzas Media.

Throughout her professional career, she has repeatedly been detained and subjected to ill-treatment by the police.

On October 4, 2013, while covering a rally by presidential candidate Jamil Hasanli in the Sabirabad District during the presidential election campaign, she was beaten and subjected to violence by police officers.

In May 2017, she was detained while performing her professional duties and released after several hours at Police Station No. 39 of the Sabail District Police Department.

In January 2019, she was again detained during her journalistic work and released after more than ten hours in custody at Police Station No. 24 of the Nizami District Police Department.

On February 11, 2020, a sit-in protest by parliamentary candidates and civil activists against the results of the parliamentary elections was dispersed by police using force in front of the Central Election Commission building. Sevinj Vagifgizi, who was covering the protest as a journalist, was detained and sustained injuries to her arm and face. She later stated that police prevented doctors from providing her with X-ray results when she sought medical examination. She filed a complaint with the Prosecutor General's Office requesting an investigation into the incident. Reporters Without Borders condemned the incident and stated that the Azerbaijani government had destroyed pluralism.

She also conducted investigative journalism in cooperation with the Organized Crime and Corruption Reporting Project (OCCRP).

== Criminal prosecution and travel ban (2015–2019) ==
On September 1, 2015, Sevinj Vagifgizi was questioned as a witness by the Serious Crimes Investigation Department of the Prosecutor General's Office. According to her account, the questioning initially concerned events in Mingachevir, specifically who filmed and disseminated footage showing the body of Bahruz Hajiyev, who died in the Mingachevir city police department. The questioning later focused on the leadership, staff, activities, and finances of Meydan TV.

On the night of September 20, 2015, Sevinj Vagifgizi, along with journalists Aytan Farhadova and Izolda Aghayeva, was detained at the airport and taken to the Main Department for Combating Organized Crime of the Ministry of Internal Affairs. An official record was drawn up, and they were informed that they were banned from leaving the country. They were released the following morning after further questioning.

She was questioned again on September 22, 2015, and several times thereafter in connection with the same case.

Numerous local and international human rights organizations, including Human Rights Watch, Reporters Without Borders, and Amnesty International, criticized the interrogation of independent journalists by the Main Department for Combating Organized Crime.

Between 2015 and 2019, Sevinj Vagifgizi was banned from leaving Azerbaijan.

On May 14, 2020, the European Court of Human Rights ruled that the travel ban imposed on Sevinj Vagifgizi was unlawful. The Azerbaijani government acknowledged the violations and paid her compensation of €5,000.

== Arrest ==
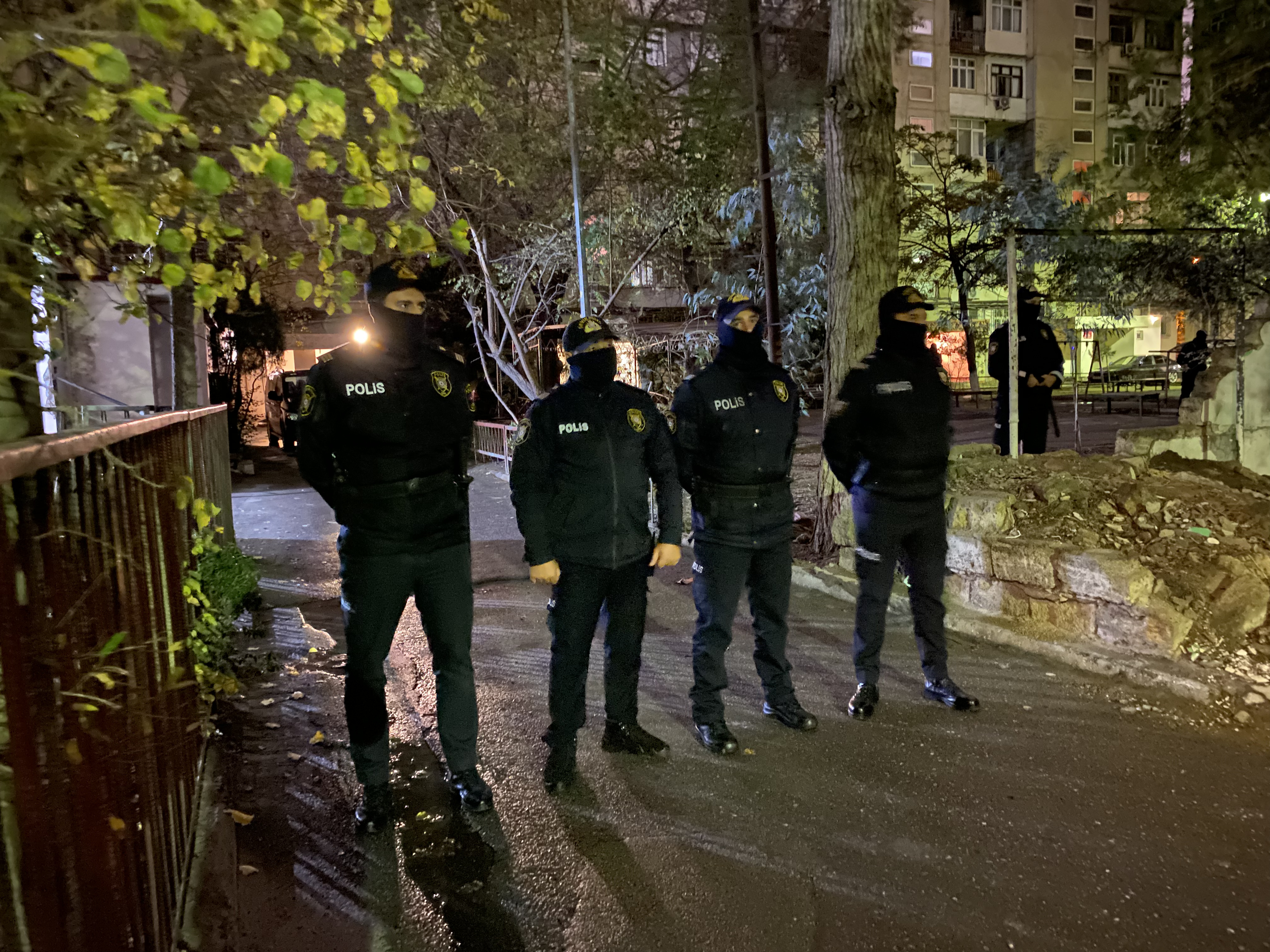
Police outside Sevinj Vagifgizi's house during a search of her apartment

On November 20, 2023, CEO of Abzas Media – Ulvi Hasanli was detained near his home while heading to the airport to travel abroad. Hasanli was taken to the Main Police Department of Baku city, where searches were carried out both at his home and at the Abzas Media office. According to Zibeyda Sadigova, who defends Hasanli's rights, during a 5-hour search in the office, the police allegedly discovered 40 000 euros. Abzas Media rejected these accusations, calling them "a scenario created to support Ulvi Hasanli’s accusations." Hasanli claimed that the questions asked to him by the police related to investigations carried out by Abzas Media. As a result, Ulvi Hasanli was arrested and charged with "smuggling."

On the night of November 20–21, the editor-in-chief of Abzas Media Sevinj Vagifgizi returned to Azerbaijan from Istanbul, knowing that she would be arrested. She was detained by police at Heydar Aliyev International Airport. On the same day, a search was carried out in her apartment. Lawyer Elchin Sadigov, who defended the rights of Sevinj Vagifgizi, stated that no illegal items were found during the search. However, a criminal case was opened against her under Article 206.3.2 of the Criminal Code (smuggling – committed by a group of persons by prior conspiracy). On November 21, Sevinj Vagifgizi was sentenced by the Khatai District Court to 3 months and 29 days of pre-trial detention.

On June 20, 2025, the court sentenced her to nine years of imprisonment. Appeals were rejected, and the sentence was upheld.

== International reaction ==
International human rights organizations such as Amnesty International, Human Rights Watch (HRW), Reporters Without Borders (RSF), Committee to Protect Journalists (CPJ), the European Federation of Journalists, the Norwegian Helsinki Committee, the Steering Committee of the Civil Society Forum of the Eastern Partnership and Freedom Now, as well as the US State Department condemned the arrest of Sevinj Vagifgizi. They called on the Azerbaijani authorities to immediately release her.

== See also ==
- Human rights in Azerbaijan
- Media freedom in Azerbaijan
