= Soyudlu protests =

Police crackdown on environmental protests in Azerbaijan

Environmental protest in Soyudlu
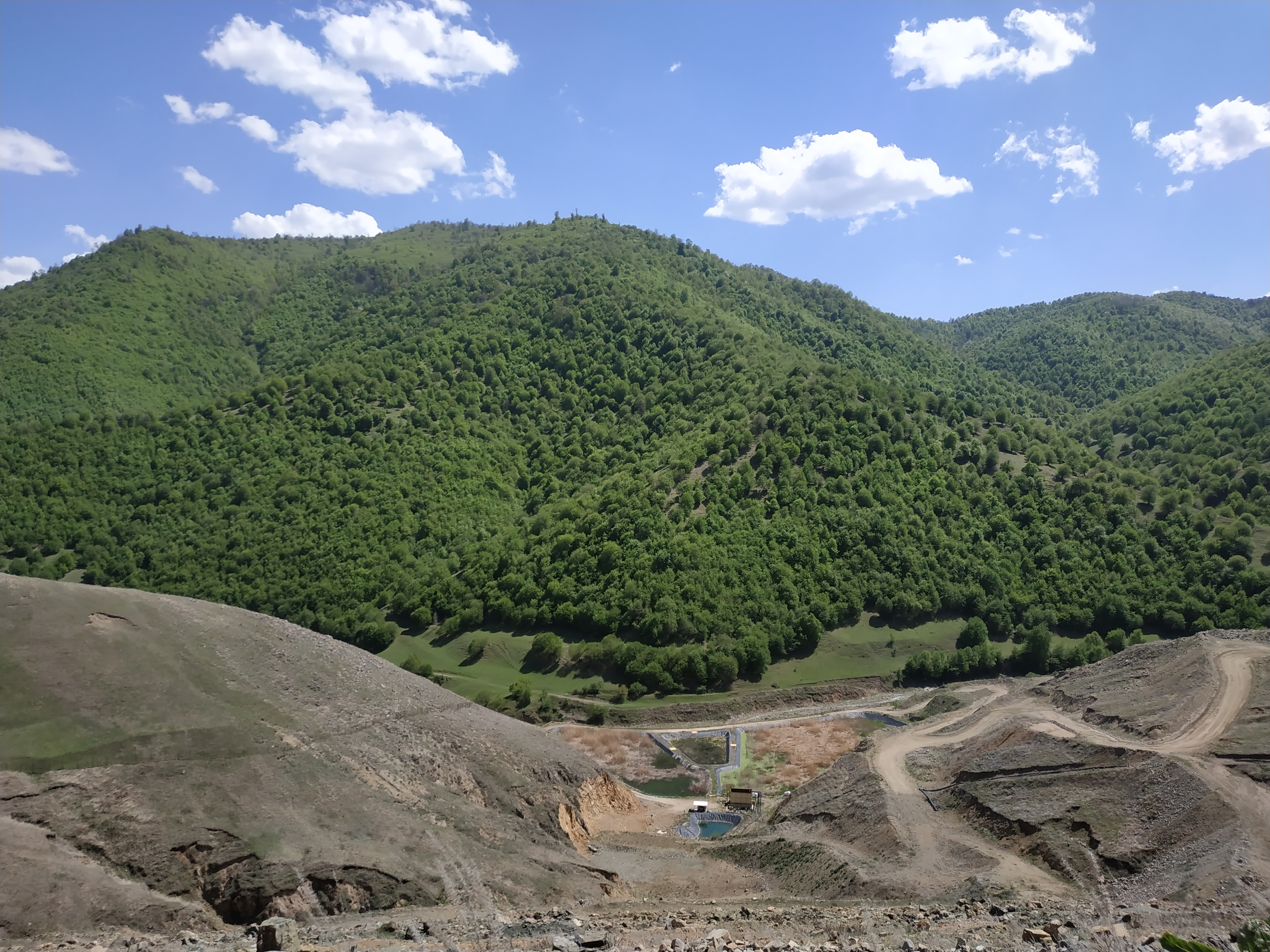
- Date: 20–27 June 2023 (initial events) with further developments through 2024
- Location: Söyüdlü (Soyudlu), Gadabay District, Azerbaijan
- Caused by: protests against the construction of a new cyanide tailings reservoir near Gadabay gold mine
- Methods: Protest, demonstration
- Result: Police crackdown; village lockdown; journalist detentions; temporary suspension of the mine, which resumed later

Parties
Local residents, journalists, activists	Azerbaijani police, Ministry of Internal Affairs

Casualties
- Injuries: c. 15 reported
- Arrested: 10+ initially; further arrests 2023–2024

Soyudlu protests or Söyüdlu events (Azerbaijani: Gədəbəy hadisələri or Söyüdlü hadisələri) are an environmental conflict that include protests and subsequent events in the village of Söyüdlü, in the Gadabay District of Azerbaijan in June, 2023.

The local population demonstrated against the planned construction of a new artificial lake containing waste from the nearby Gadabay gold mine. The crackdown on the protests by the Azerbaijani police, and video footage published by independent media (showing police using tear gas and rubber bullets against villagers, including elderly women) drew widespread criticism from human rights groups, which described it as disproportionate and unlawful.

During the crackdown, ten protestors were detained and reportedly 15 were injured. Of the detained, 1 was an Azerbaijani journalists, while three other Azerbaijani journalists were forcibly removed from the area, preventing coverage. The village of Soyudlu was put under lockdown by the Azerbaijani government, preventing entry and exit from the village.

These events became notable both for the severity of the crackdown and for its broader implications for environmental governance, rural community rights, and press freedom in Azerbaijan.

== Background ==
Residents of Söyüdlü had long-standing concerns about the Gadabay gold mine(operated by Anglo Asian Mining PLC) because of alleged pollution and negative health impacts linked to it. Hence when, in June 2023, local authorities confirmed plans to construct an additional artificial lake for cyanide-containing waste, it prompted renewed public opposition and demonstrations.

== Chronology of protests ==
On 20–21 June, villagers gathered to block construction vehicles and demand environmental guarantees. Police deployed tear gas and rubber bullets, and videos shared by journalists showed police chasing and spraying elderly women taking part in the protest.

23 June 2023 - The protests spiked, following which activists and journalist were detained. Approximately fifteen people were injured and at least ten detained.

24 June 2023 - The village was places under a lockdown as law enforcement set up checkpoints around it to restict access. OC Media and other media outlets reported that Söyüdlü was effectively under lockdown and non-residents were denied access.

26 June 2023 - Protest at a United States Embassy function - US Embassy security handed activists and journalist protesting against the gold mine to Azerbaijani police.

27 June 2023, Nazim Baydamirli, a former lawmaker from the district, who publicly supported residents' concerns, was arrested and later placed in pre-trial detention after state media accused him of “coordinating” the protests.

== Government response ==
The Ministry of Internal Affairs defended the police actions, saying officers had responded to “public order violations.” On July 13, 2023, Azerbaijani Prime Minister Ali Asadov stated that because of the "dangers that emerged in the village against nature and public health," the mining activitied at the Gadabay mine would be "temporarily'' suspend and an unnamed "international company" was invited to conduct an ecological and geological audit, following which Anglo Asian Mining would be able to resume operating the mine once compliance with recommendations of the audit is established.

A resident, speaking on condition of anonymity to media, expressed scepticism about the measures taken, informing that government officials visited the village to speak with residents, yet no visible actions were taken and the work around the cyanide lake had resumed.

By mid-2024 no ecological audit report or independent investigation was released, and no steps taken to address the environmental concerns raised during the protests. Local residents described continuing fears about contamination and health risks, while observers noted that the authorities' promises of audit and review amounted to “symbolic concessions” resulting in no actual change, while movement restrictions and security measures around the village remained in place.

== Media access and detention of journalists ==
Journalists attempting to cover the protests were reportedly detained or expelled from the area, in some cases their equipment was also confiscated. Reporters from Abzas Media, Voice of America’s Azerbaijani Service, and Meydan TV stated that police forcibly removed them from the village and threatened them with violence if they continued filming.

The Committee to Protect Journalists and Reporters Without Borders condemned the detentions as violations of press freedom and called on the government to ensure media access and freedom to report without obstruction.

Several of the journalists detained in Soyudlu were arrested again in late 2023 and early 2024 for reporting on mining-sector corruption or environmental issues. Press freedom groups linked these cases to a broader crackpdown ahead of the 2024 presidential elections in Azerbaijan.

== Anglo Asian Mining and legal action ==
Anglo Asian Mining, the company operating the Gadabay mine, had previously faced criticism and was accused of “exploiting” a long-standing conflict between Armenian-Azerbaijani for financial gain. In 2023, a US-based legal foundation filed a civil lawsuit alleging that the company indirectly contributed to the humanitarian impact of the blockade of Nagorno-Karabakh.

Some analysts contrasted the state's forceful response to the Soyudlu protests with its tolerance of the contemporaneous “eco-activist” blockade of the Lachin Corridor, which international observers widely described as politically organised. Commentators argued that the episode illustrated *selective enforcement and the political use of environmental rhetoric* in Azerbaijan.

== International reaction ==
The Council of Europe Commissioner for Human Rights expressed concerns about the “disproportionate use of force” by police and restrictions on journalists and human rights defenders, stressing that the lockdown of the village raised “serious concerns about the human rights of local residents, including freedom of movement and respect for private life”.

IPHR and CPJ issued statements calling on Azerbaijani authorities to investigate reports of police violence against members of the press and to ensure journalists can cover protests without obstruction.

Human Rights Watch and Amnesty International documented use of violent force by police, restricted village access and alleged arbitrary detentions of protesters and journalists.

== See also ==
- Environmental issues in Azerbaijan
- Human rights in Azerbaijan
