= Fountains Square Christmas Market =

Annually held Christmas market at the Fountain's Square in Baku, Azerbaijan

Cold hands, warm heart Soyuq əllər, isti ürək
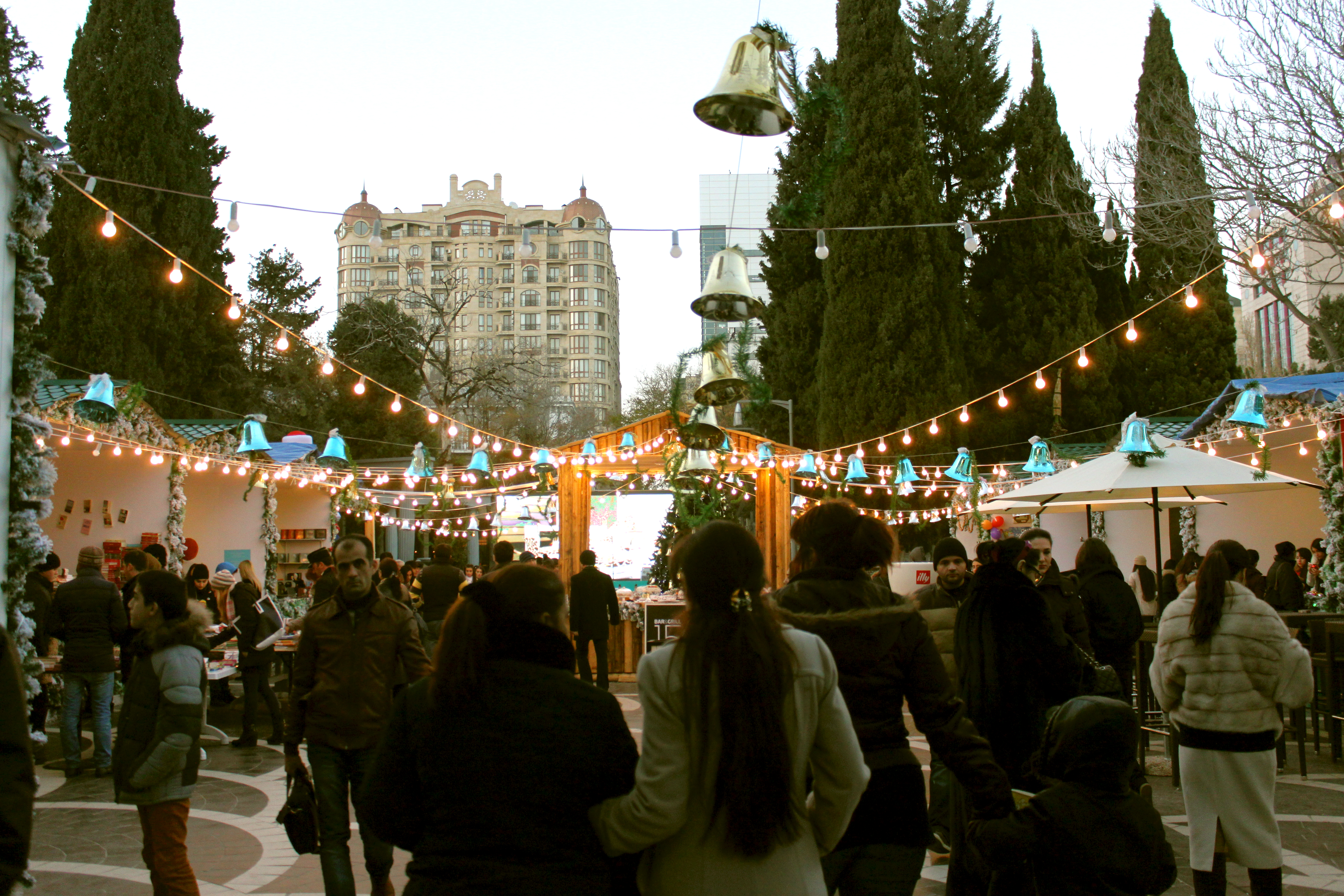
- The market in 2013
- Nickname: Fountains Square Christmas Market; Fountains Square New Year's Market; Winter Fairy Tale of Baku
- Genre: Christmas market Charity event
- Date: December – 15 January
- Locations: Fountains Square, Baku
- Coordinates: 40°22′15″N 49°50′13″E
- Country: Azerbaijan
- Years active: 2013–present
- Inaugurated: 17 December 2013
- Capacity: 84 stands
- Website: nargisfund.com/az/fairs

The Fountains Square Christmas Market or Fountains Square New Year's Market (Azerbaijani: Fəvvarələr meydanı yeni il yarmarkası), officially Cold hands, warm heart (Azerbaijani: Soyuq əllər, isti ürək), is an annually held Christmas market at the Fountain's Square in Baku, Azerbaijan, that operates daily from December to January 15. It's a charity fair organized by the "Nargis" foundation.

== History ==
It was first opened on December 17, 2013, by the "Nargis" foundation, with the aim being to help kids will serious illnesses. Since 2015, the Amapola company has co-hosted the event. It is also funded by The Coca-Cola Company. A 2019 ranking put the market on the 4th place of most convenient CIS New Year's fairs.

== Stands ==
Among the population the fair is also known as Winter Fairy Tale of Baku. Entrance to the market is free and it operates daily from 11:00 to 23:00. The over 84 stands and 3 two-story restaurants are decorated and built just like other European Christmas markets, with the difference being that Azerbaijanis concentrate on Novy God instead of Christmas, which is not celebrated as Azerbaijan is Muslim. People can buy gifts, souvenirs, books and "Yolka" balls, but also traditional Azerbaijani, Turkish and generally popular Christmas food such as sausages, paxlava or fish sandwiches. The stands also sell organic products. Some stands also offer pictures with snowmen, Ded Moroz (Şaxta Baba) and other popular figures. In the middle of the stand, there is a big decorated New Year's tree (Yolka) with the Coca-Cola sign.

== Gallery ==
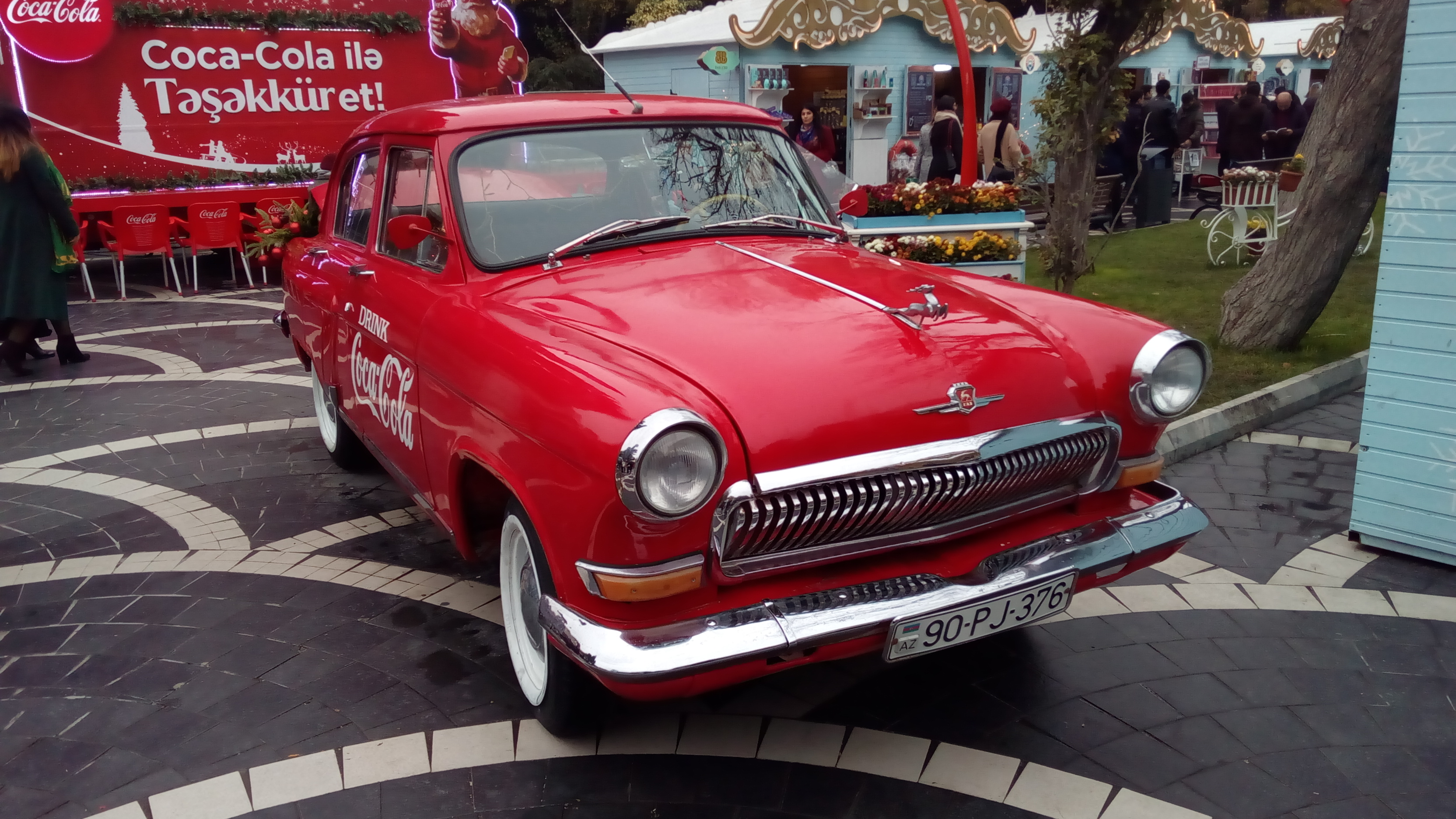
A Coca-Cola car

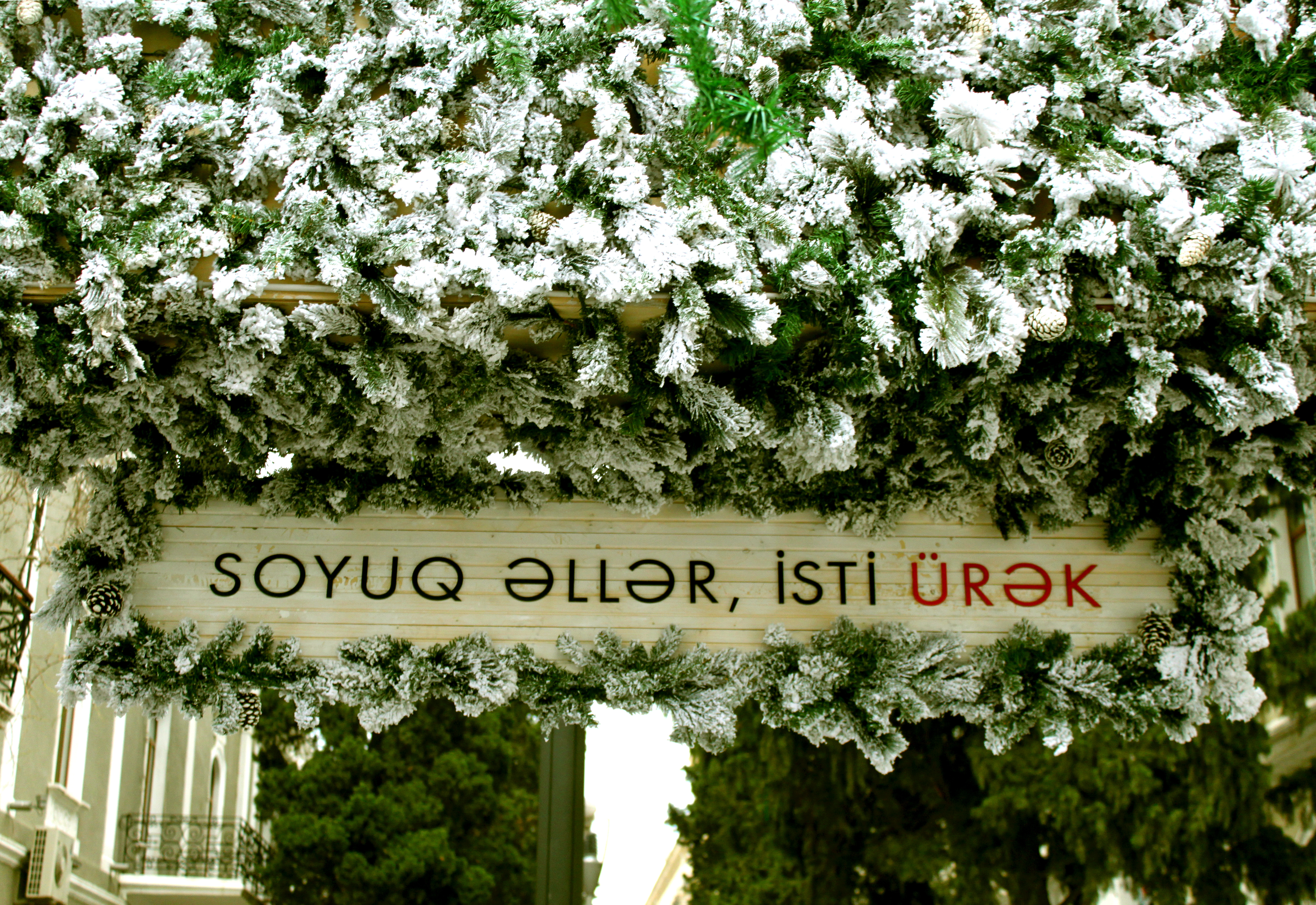
A stand with the name of the market on it

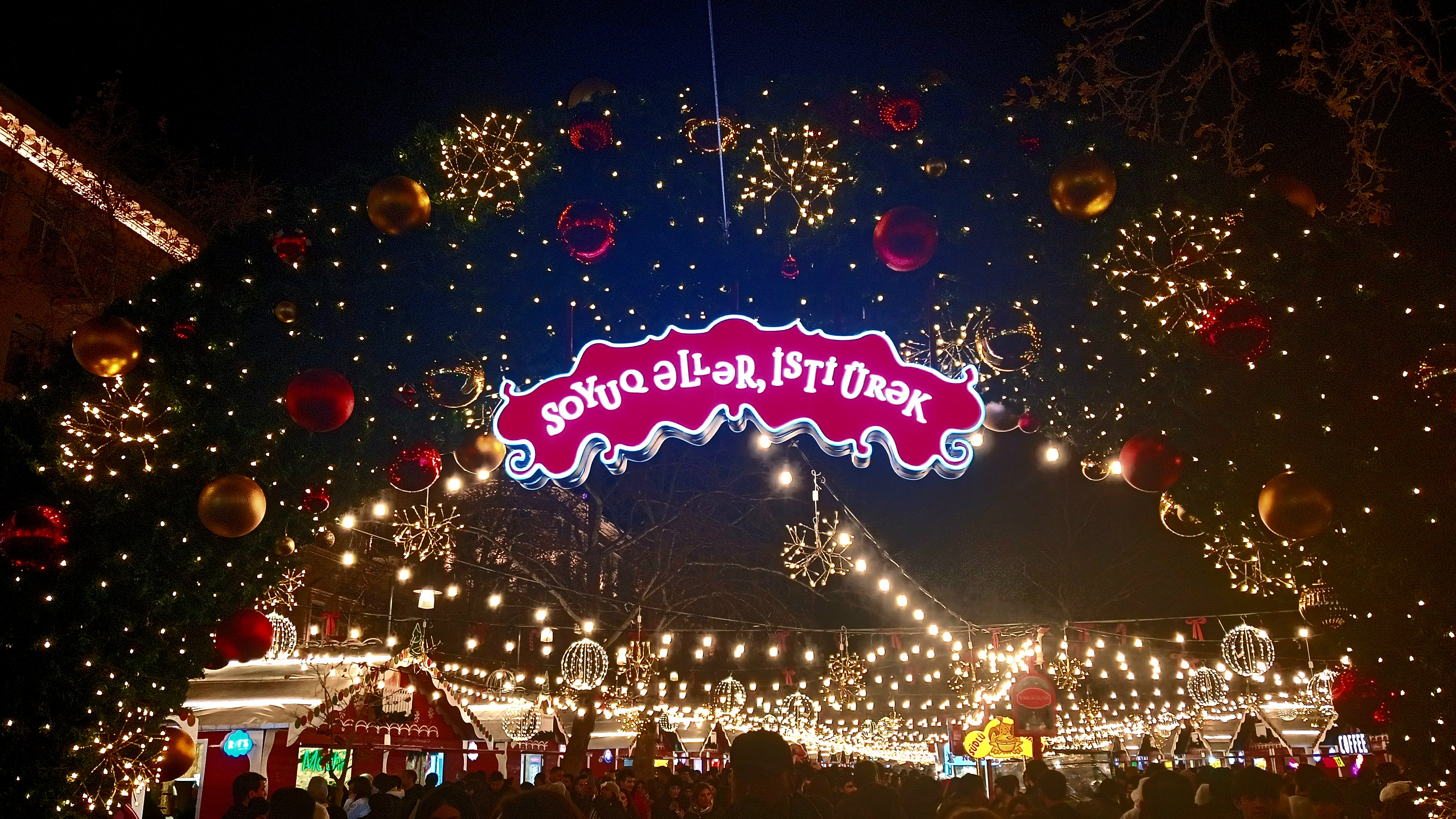
Entrance to the market

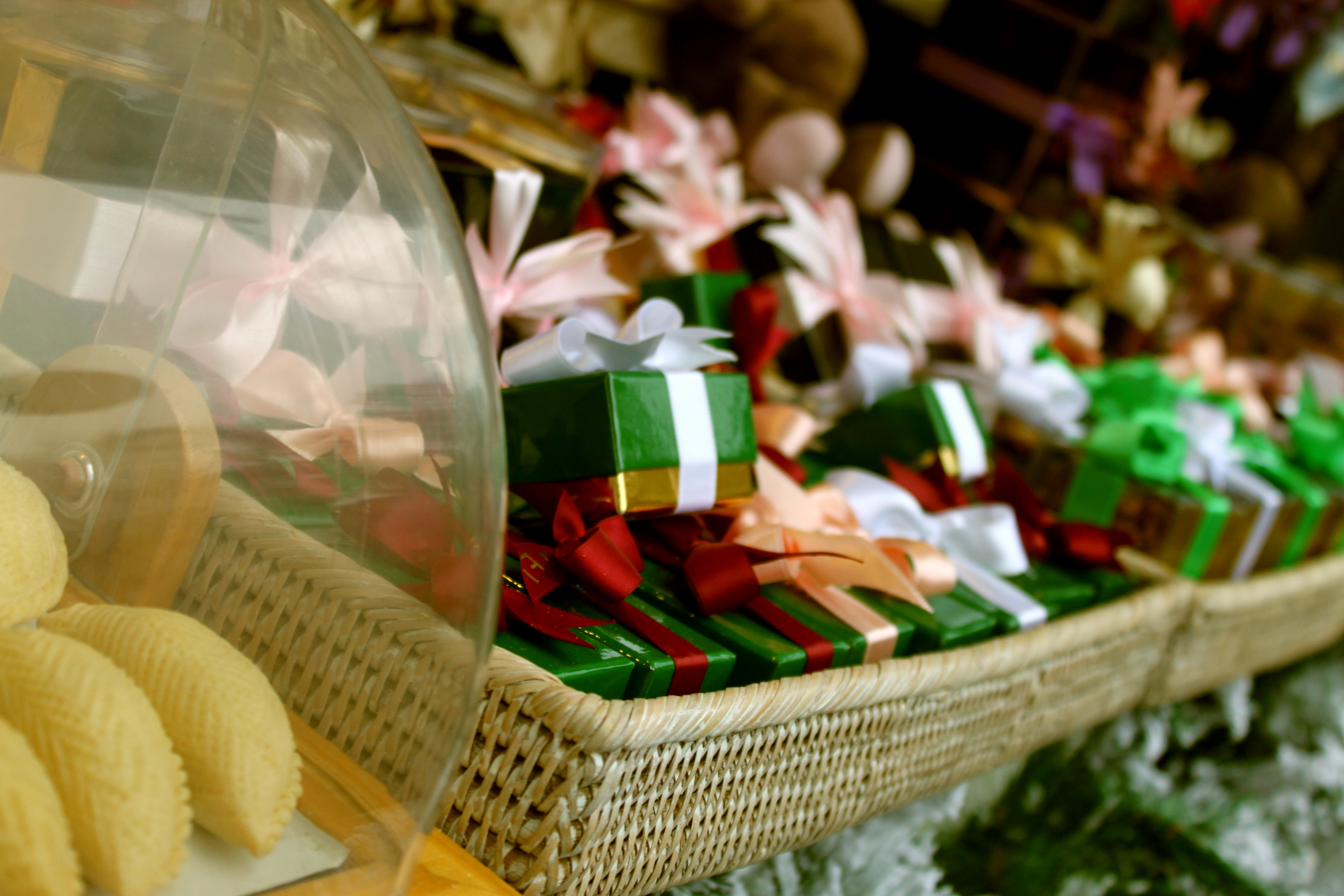
Stand selling souvenirs and shekarbura
