= Fountains Square, Baku =

Public square in Baku, Azerbaijan

Fountains Square
- Nickname: "Parapet"
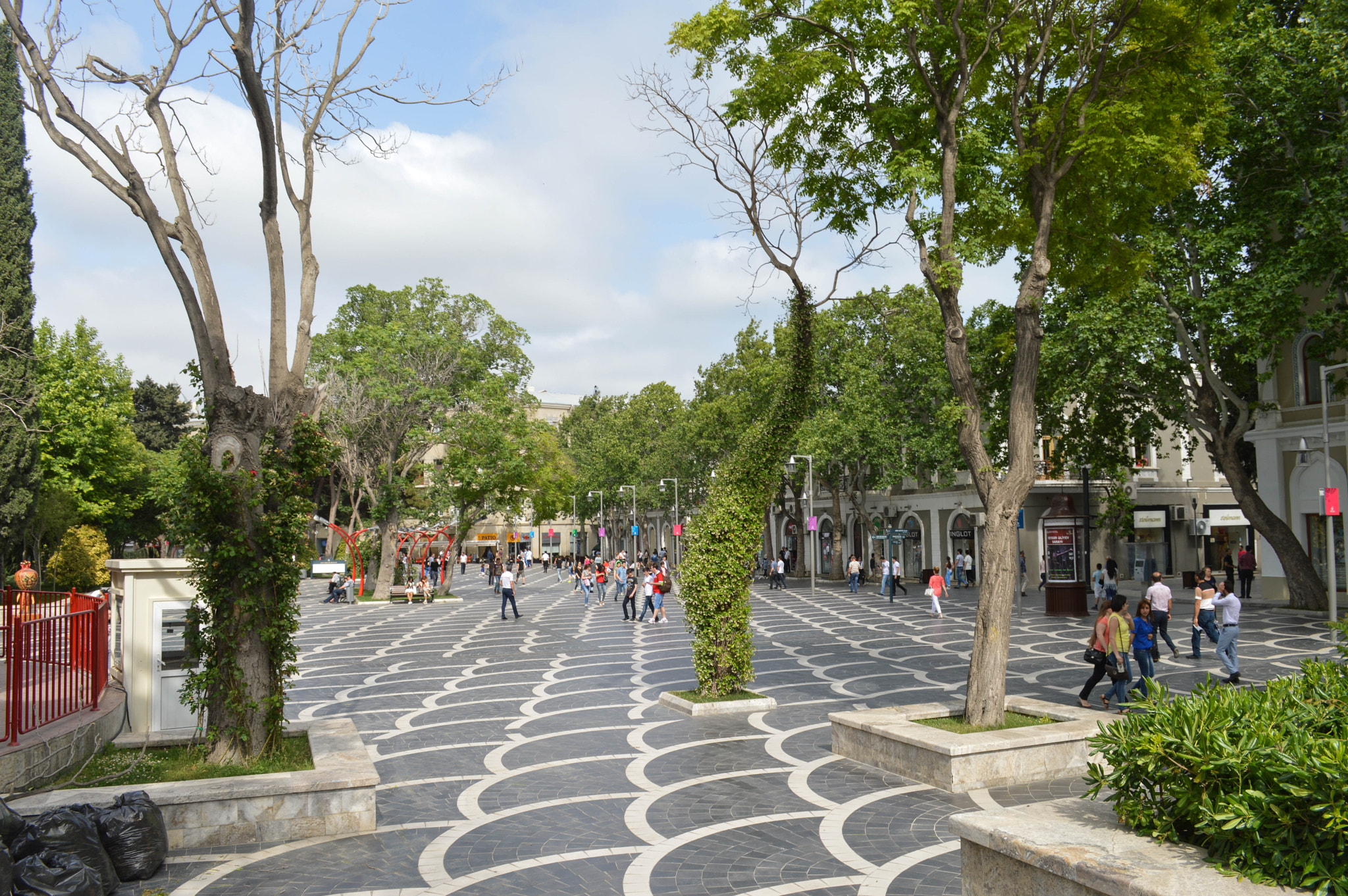
- Location: Sabail raion, Baku, Azerbaijan
- Interactive map of Fountains Square
- Coordinates: 40°22′15″N 49°50′13″E

Fountains Square (Azerbaijani: Fəvvarələr meydanı) is a public square in downtown Baku, capital of Azerbaijan. The square was previously called Parapet and is often referenced as the same name now. The name of the fountains square derives from the presence of dozens of fountains throughout the square first constructed during Soviet rule of Azerbaijan.

The square is a public gathering place, especially after business hours and during the weekend. It is an attractive tourist destination with many boutiques, restaurants, shops, hotels and passage. It starts from the Istiglaliyyat Street and walls of the Icheri Sheher and stretches through Nizami Street, also called in popular culture as the Torgovaya street running parallel to Baku Boulevard. The fountains square is a location where the city authorities hold many public festivals, shows and celebrations.

In 2010, the square was renovated by Baku authorities. A "Fountains Square" salad has been named after the square.

Since 2013, there is an annual christmas market and charity event held at the square from December to January.

== Views of the Fountains Square ==
Fountains Square

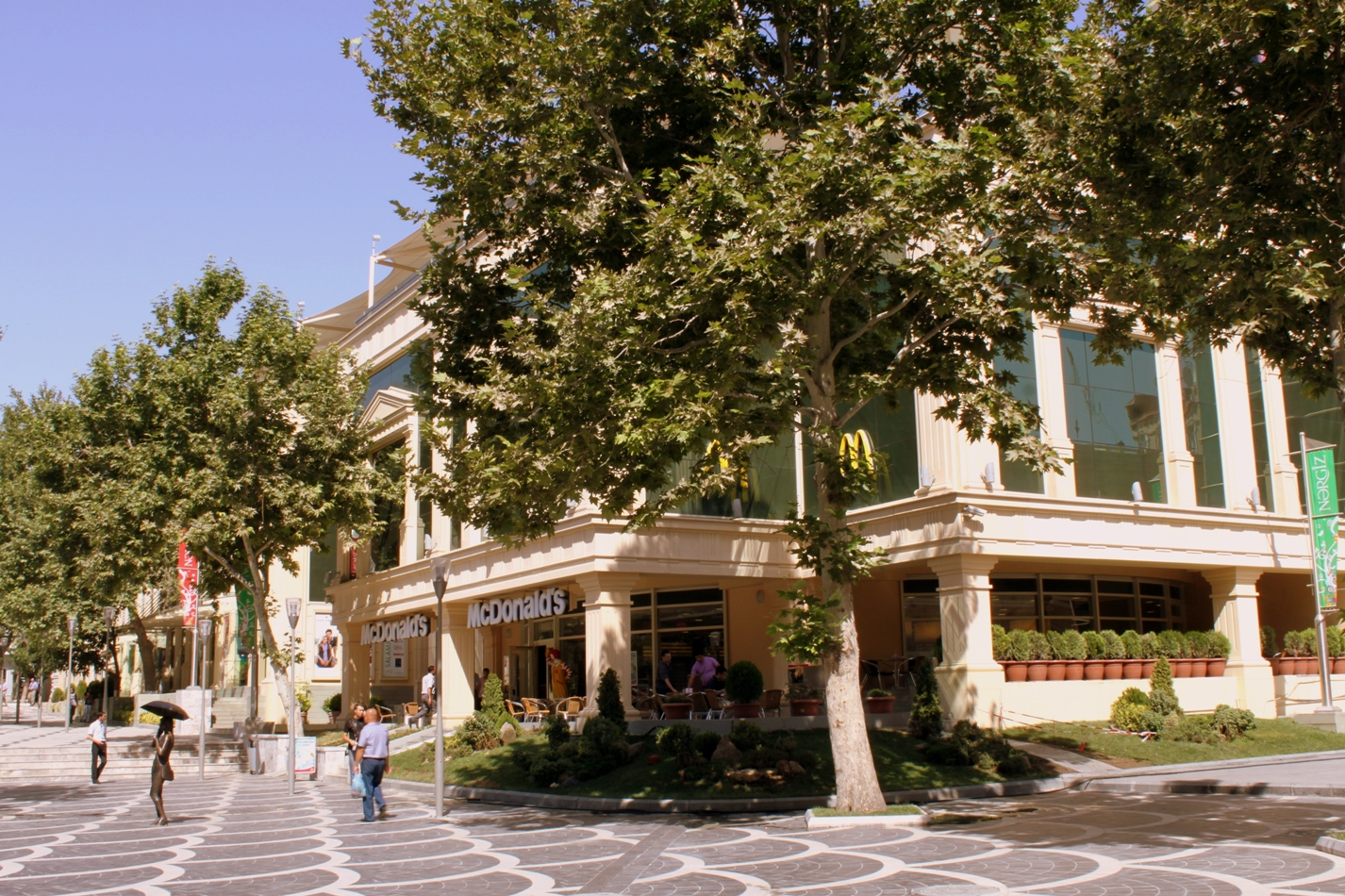
The first McDonald's in Baku on Fountains Square

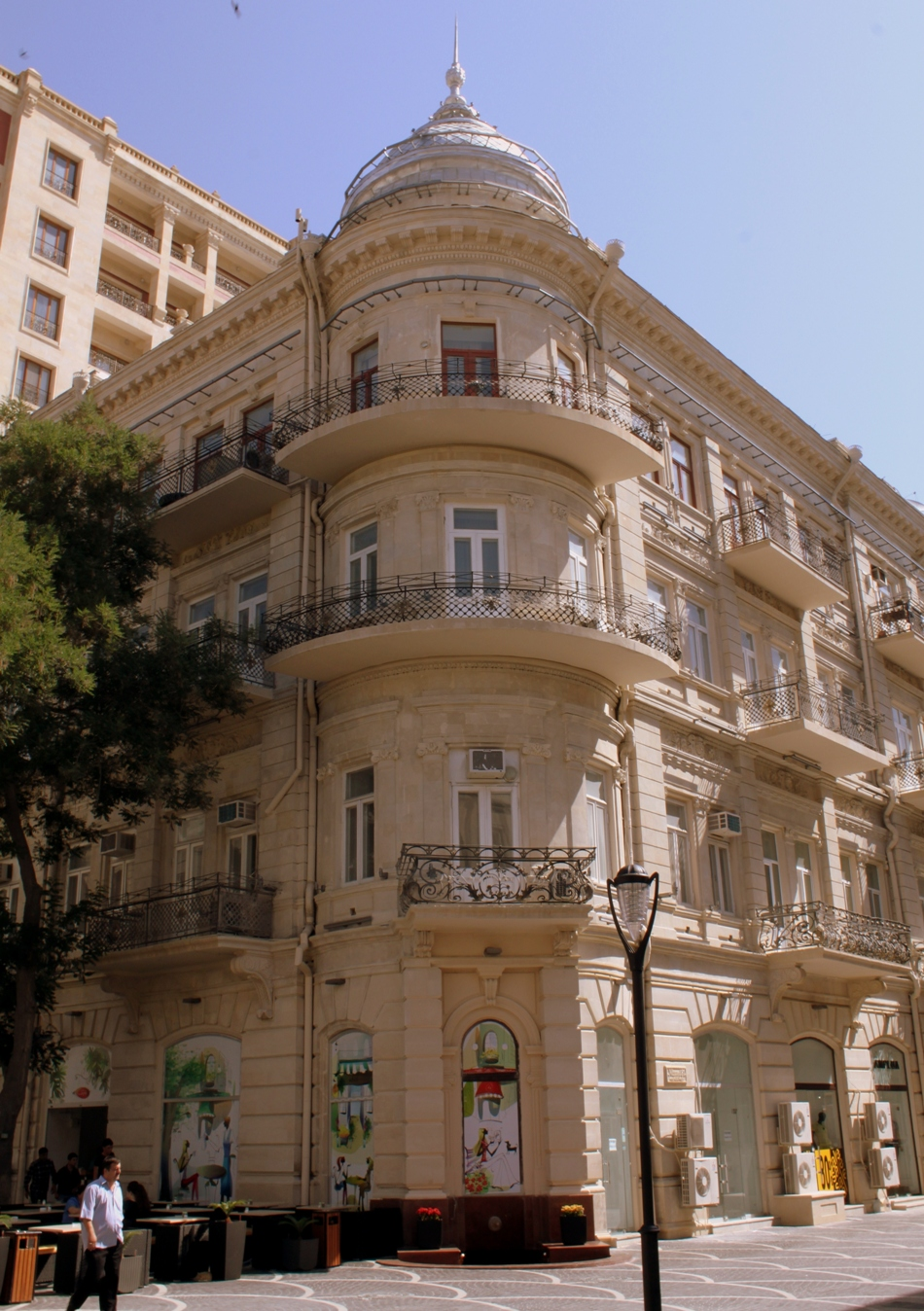
19th century building on Nizami street

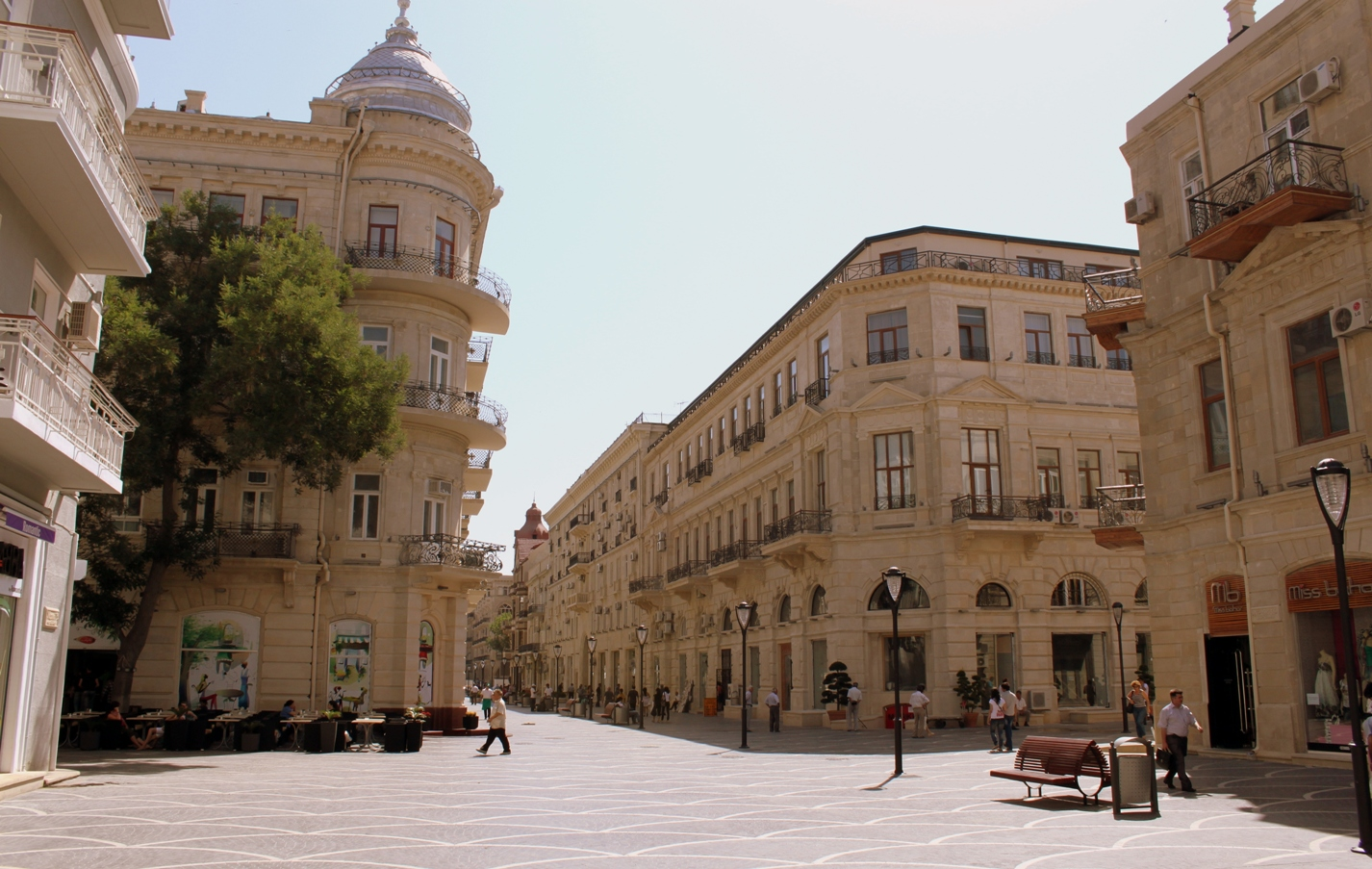
Torgovaya street awaiting the evening crowd

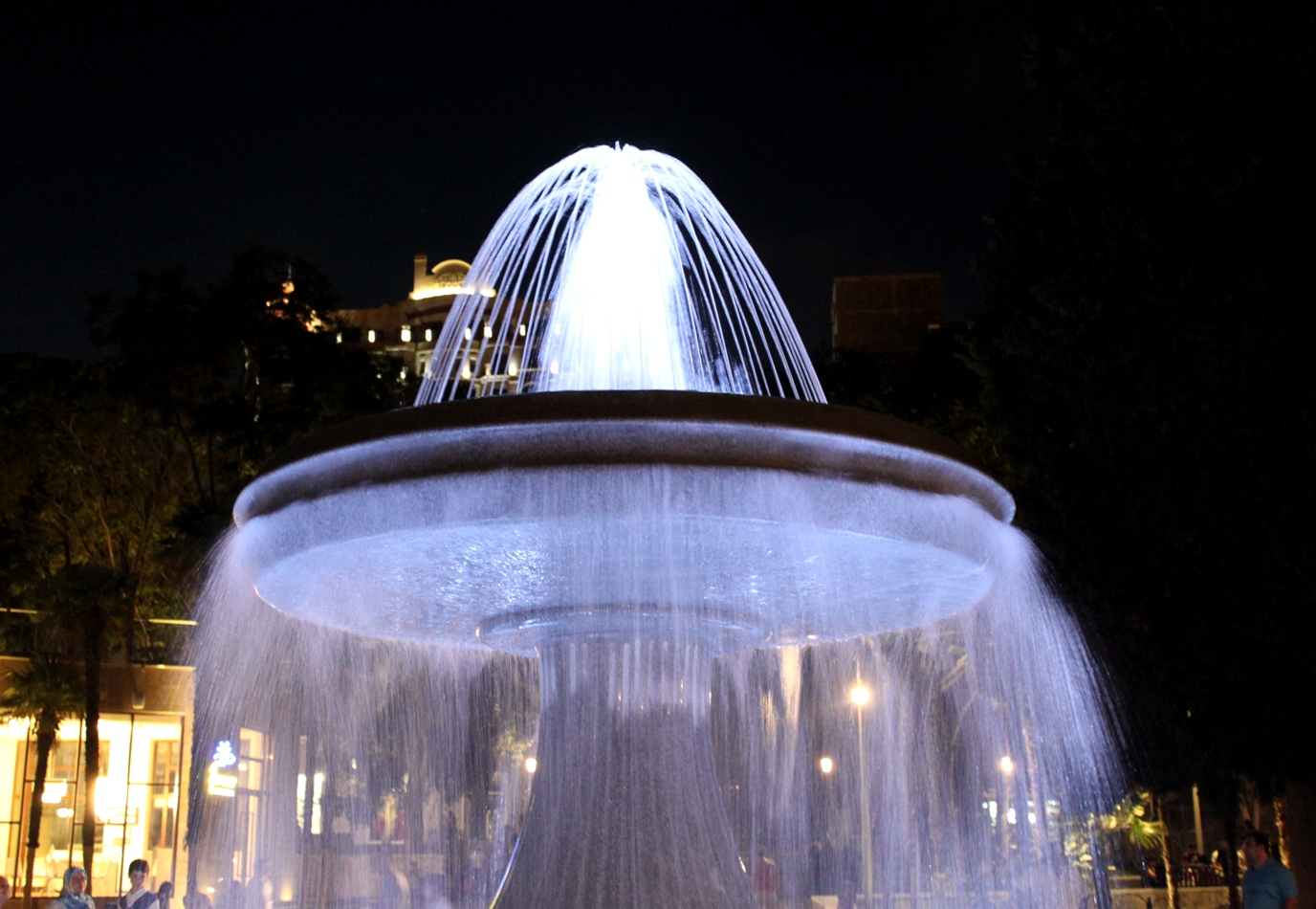
Evening fountain

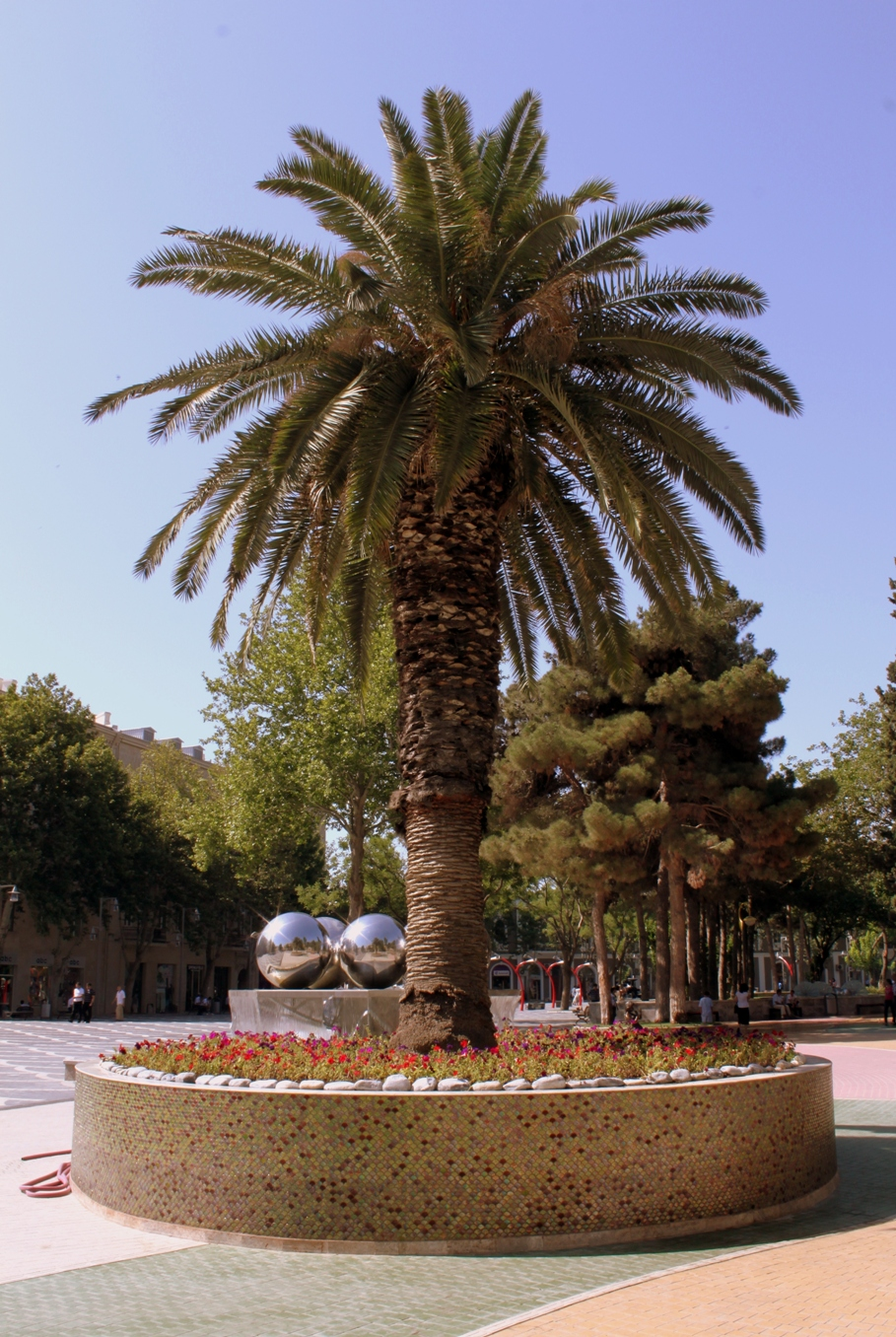
Palm tree - popular decoration of new Baku

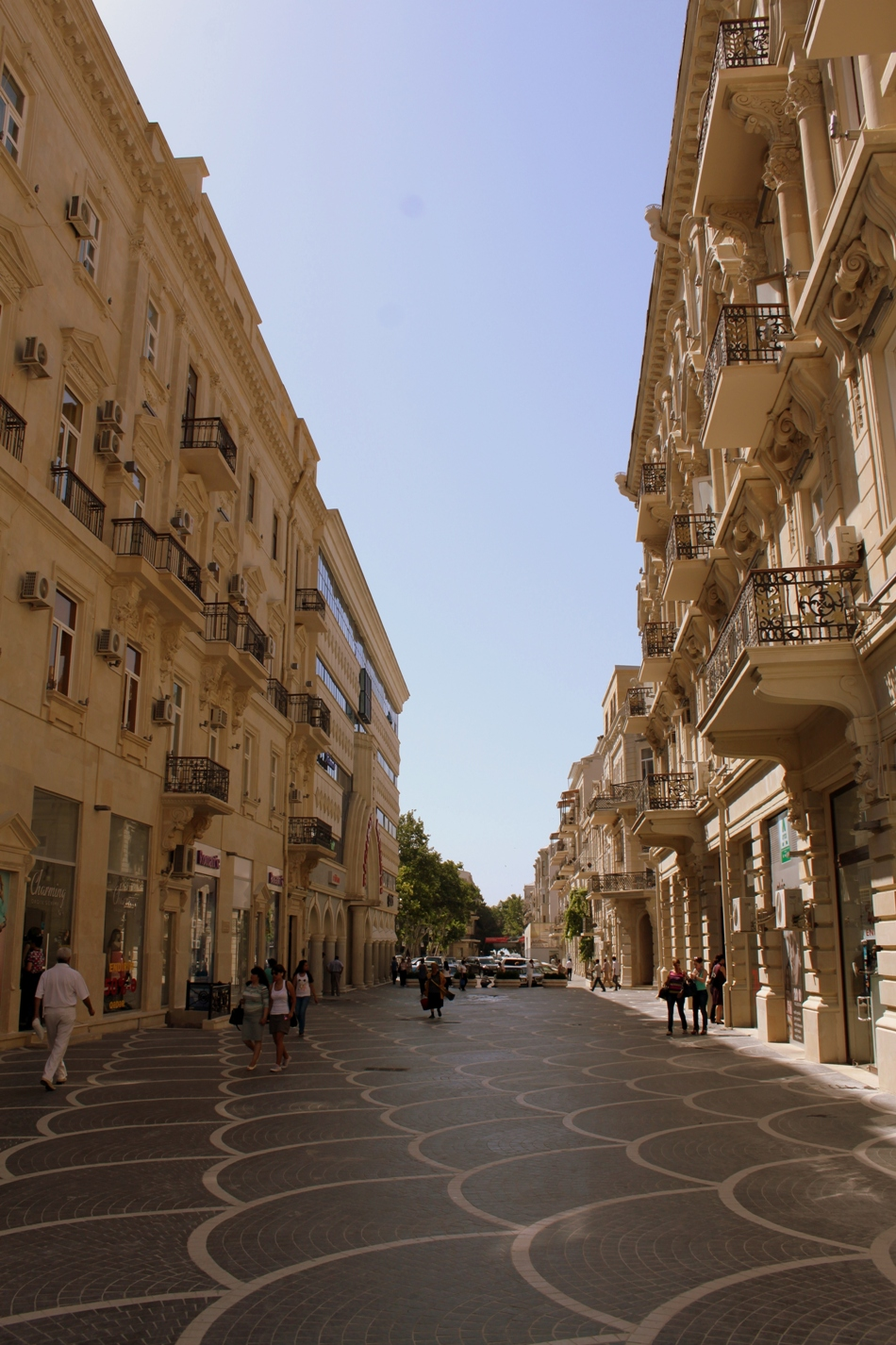
Morning hours

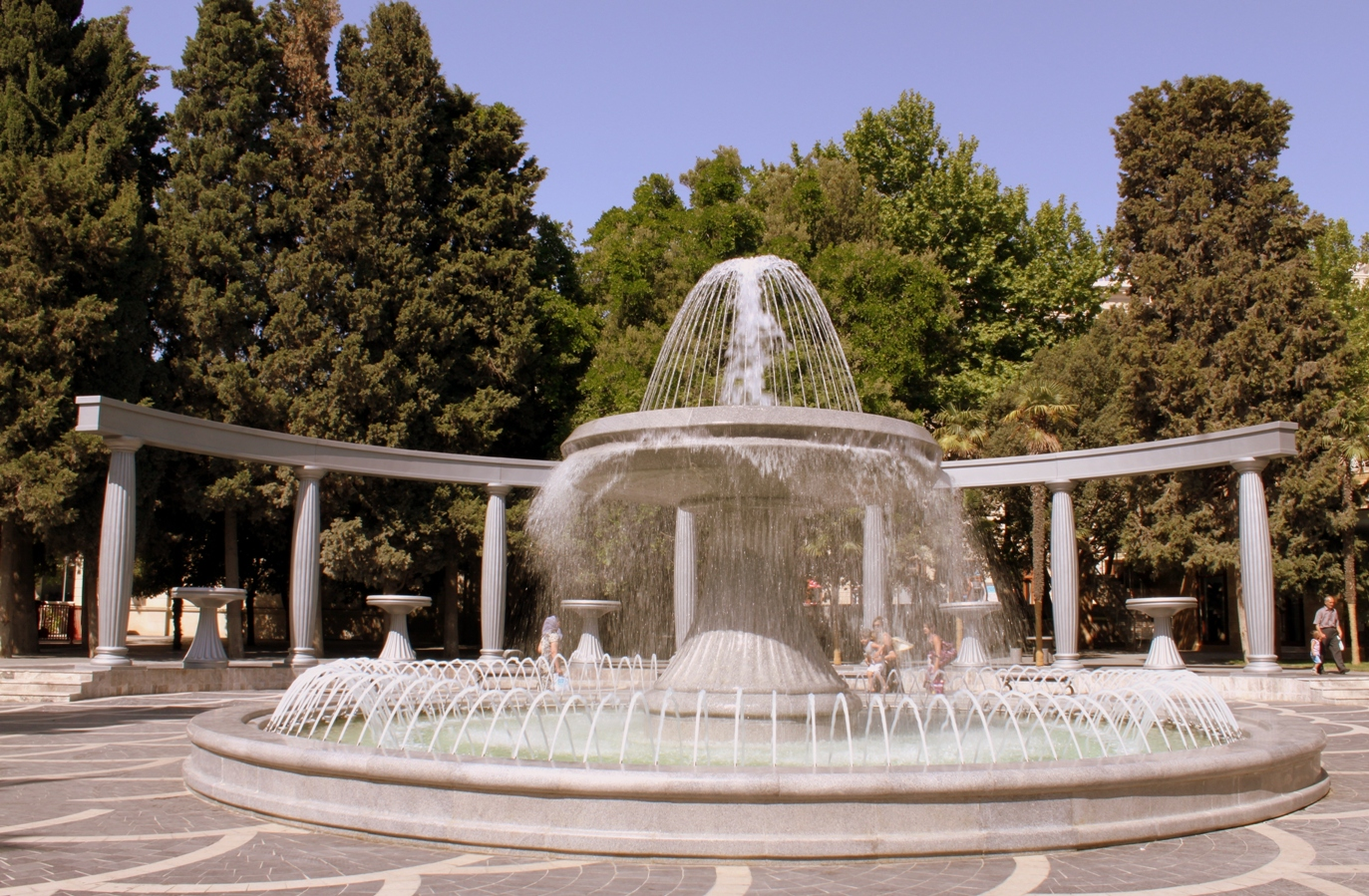
Main fountain

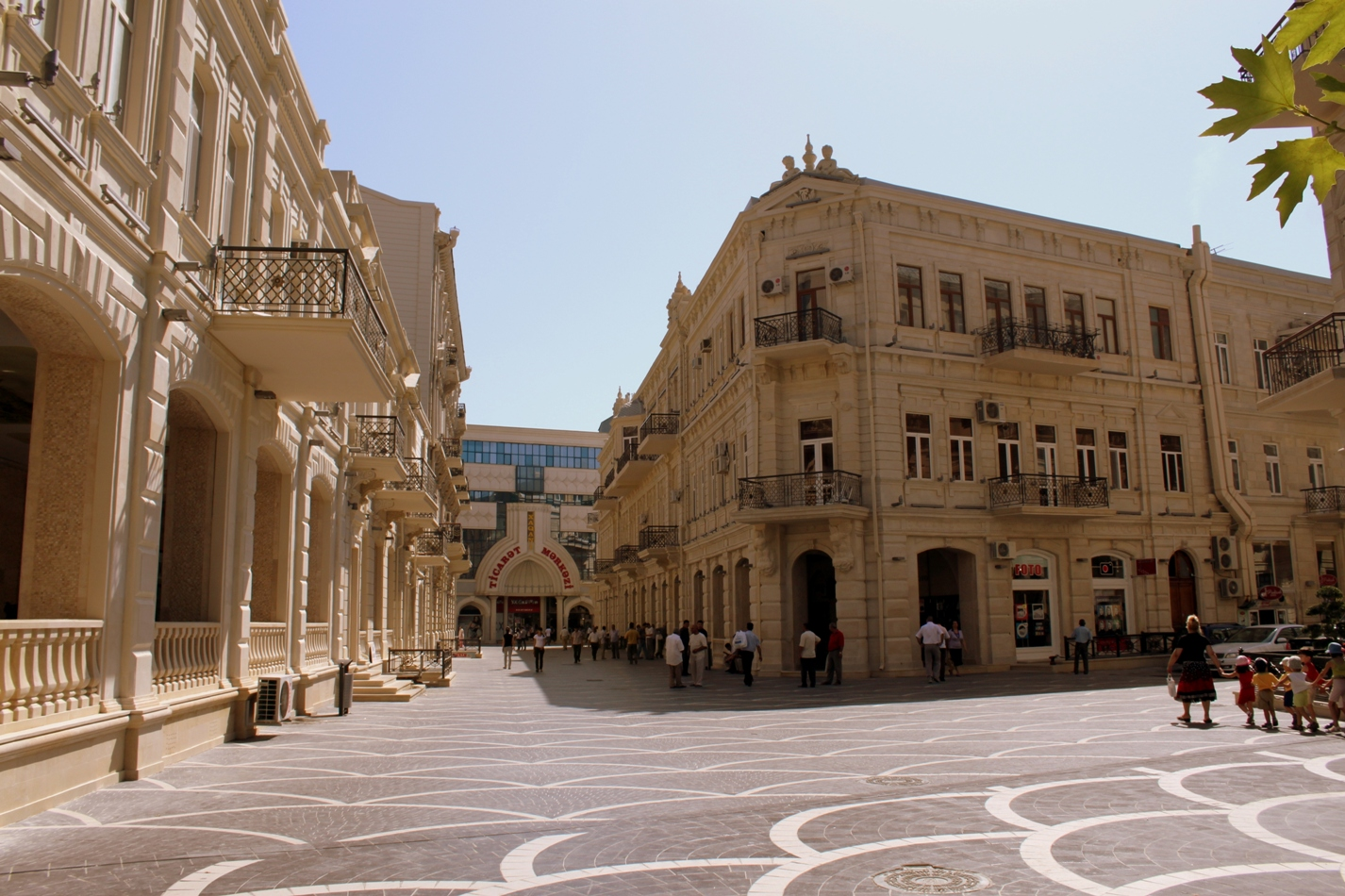
Passage crowded with merchants of antiques after business hours

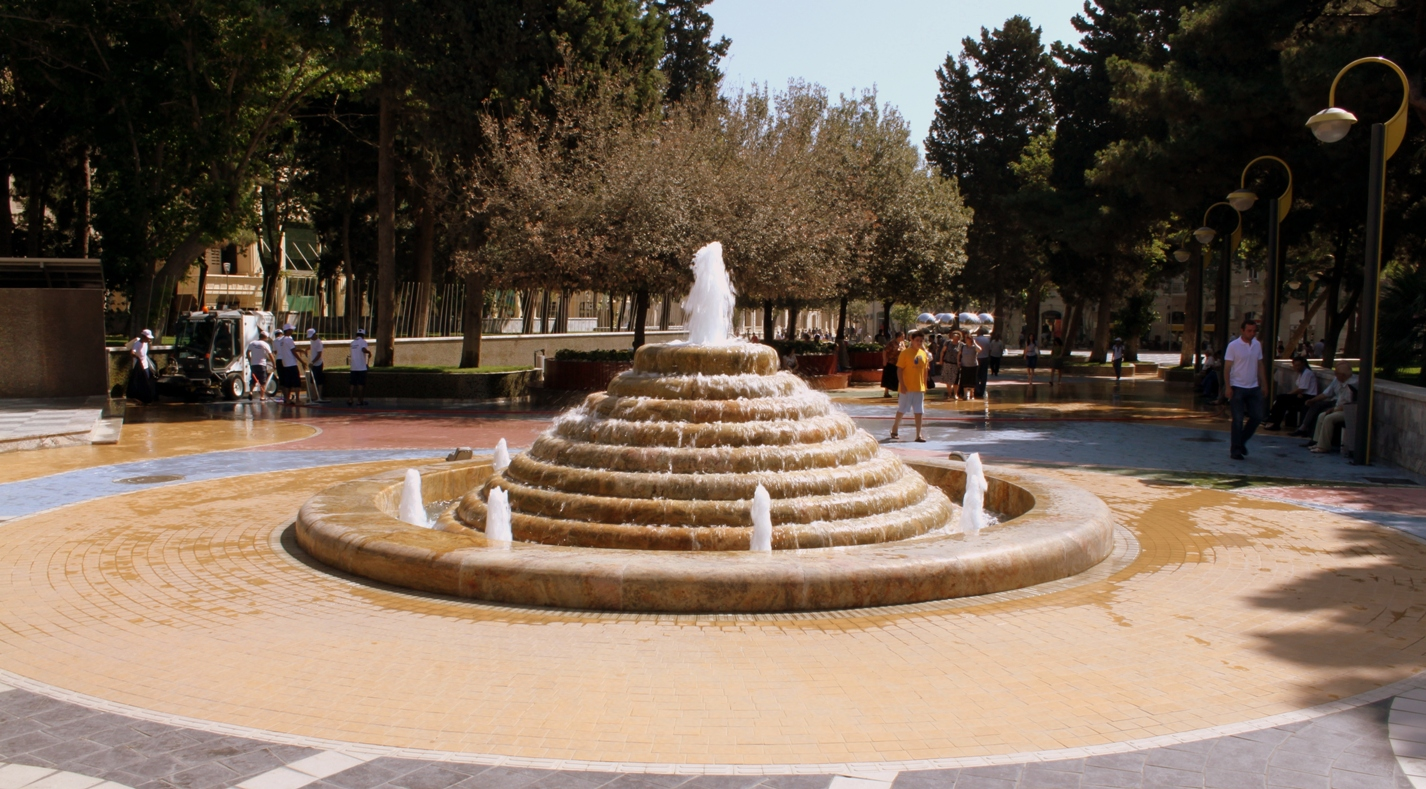
Another fountain

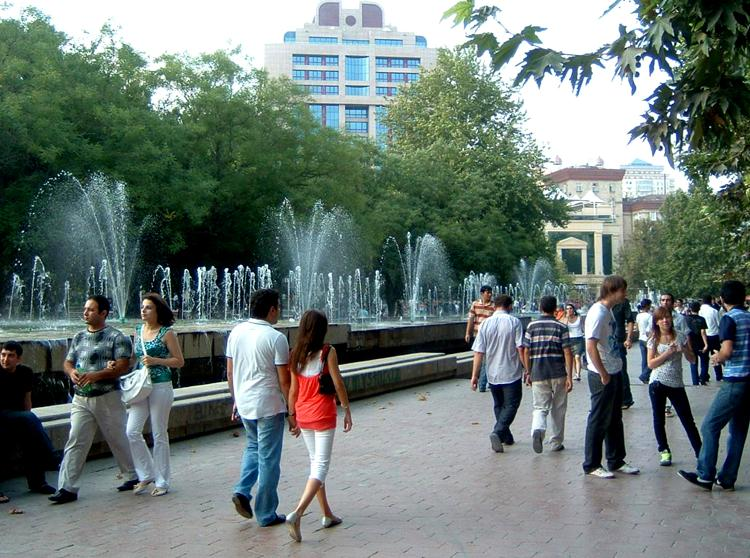
Fountains Square in 2008 before reconstruction

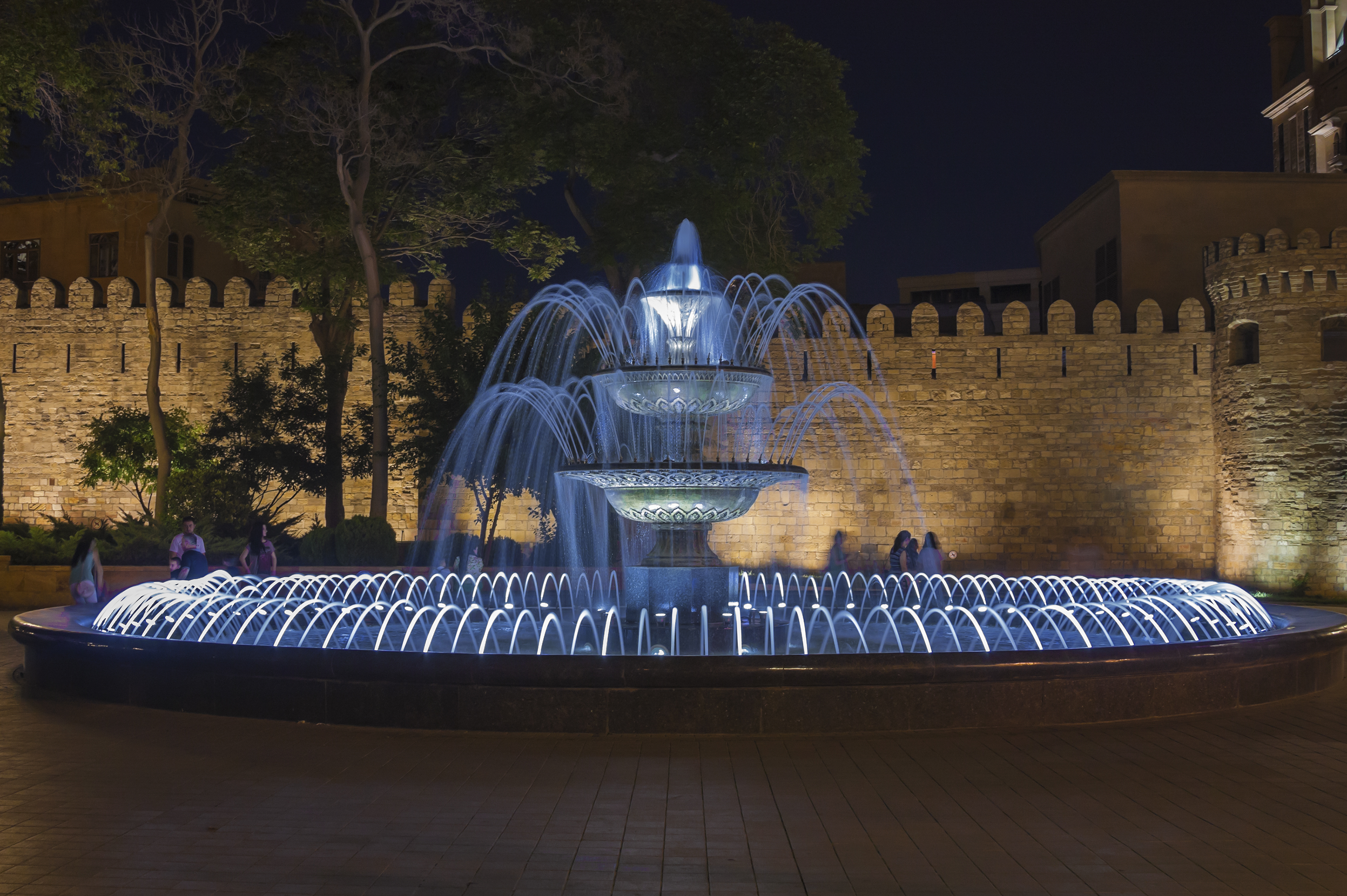
Fountain in the "Governor's garden" in Baku

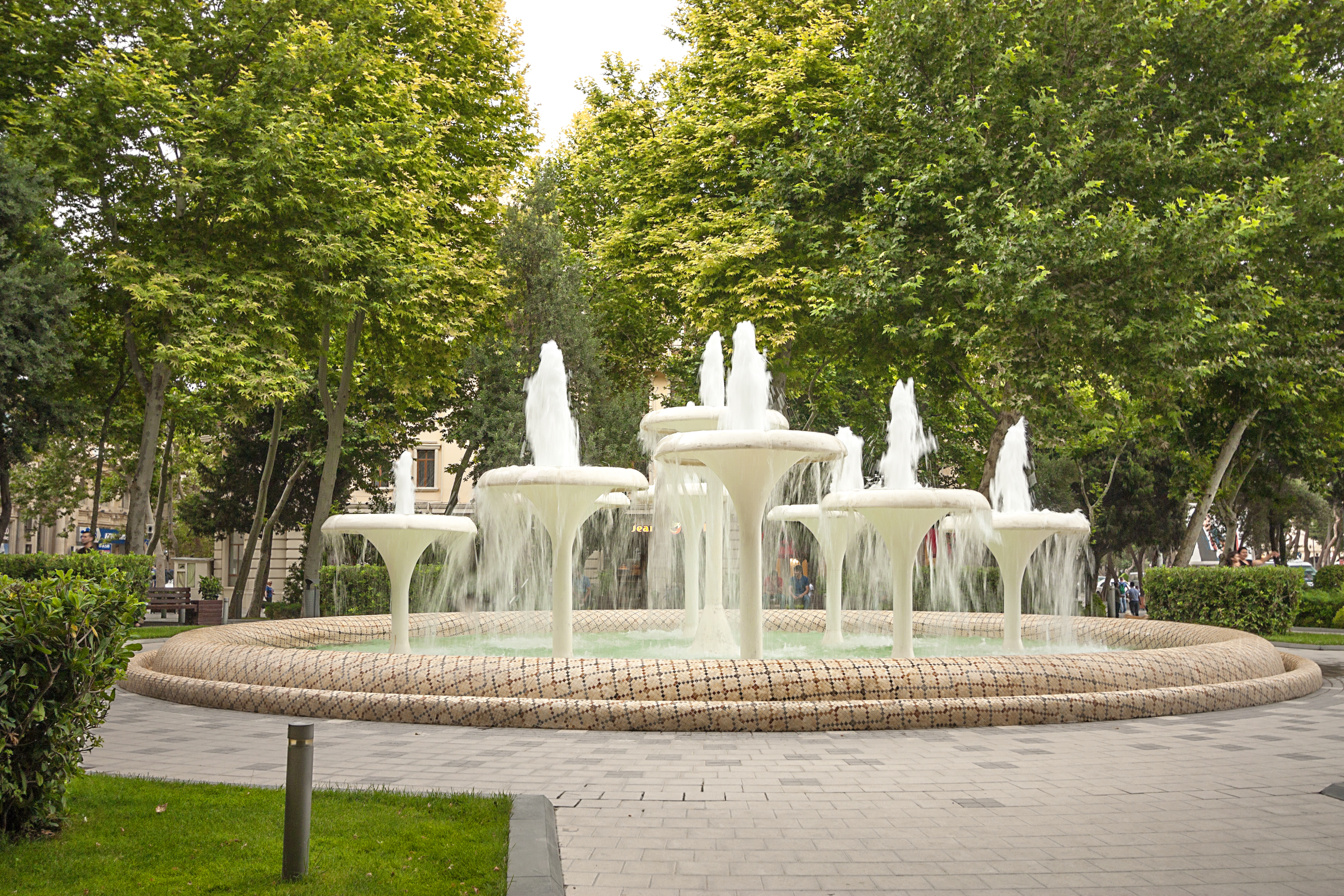
IFountain

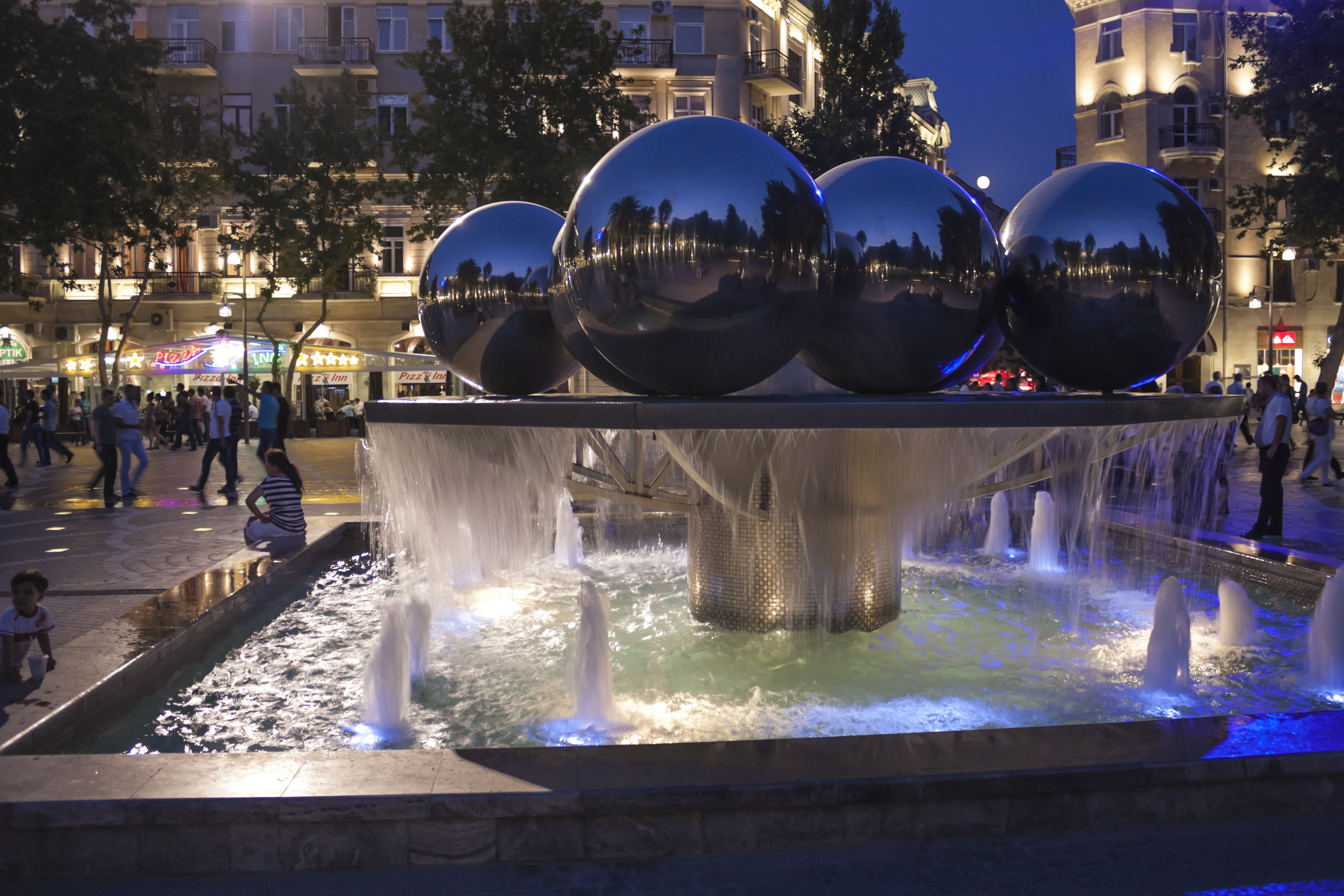
Fountain "Balls" night

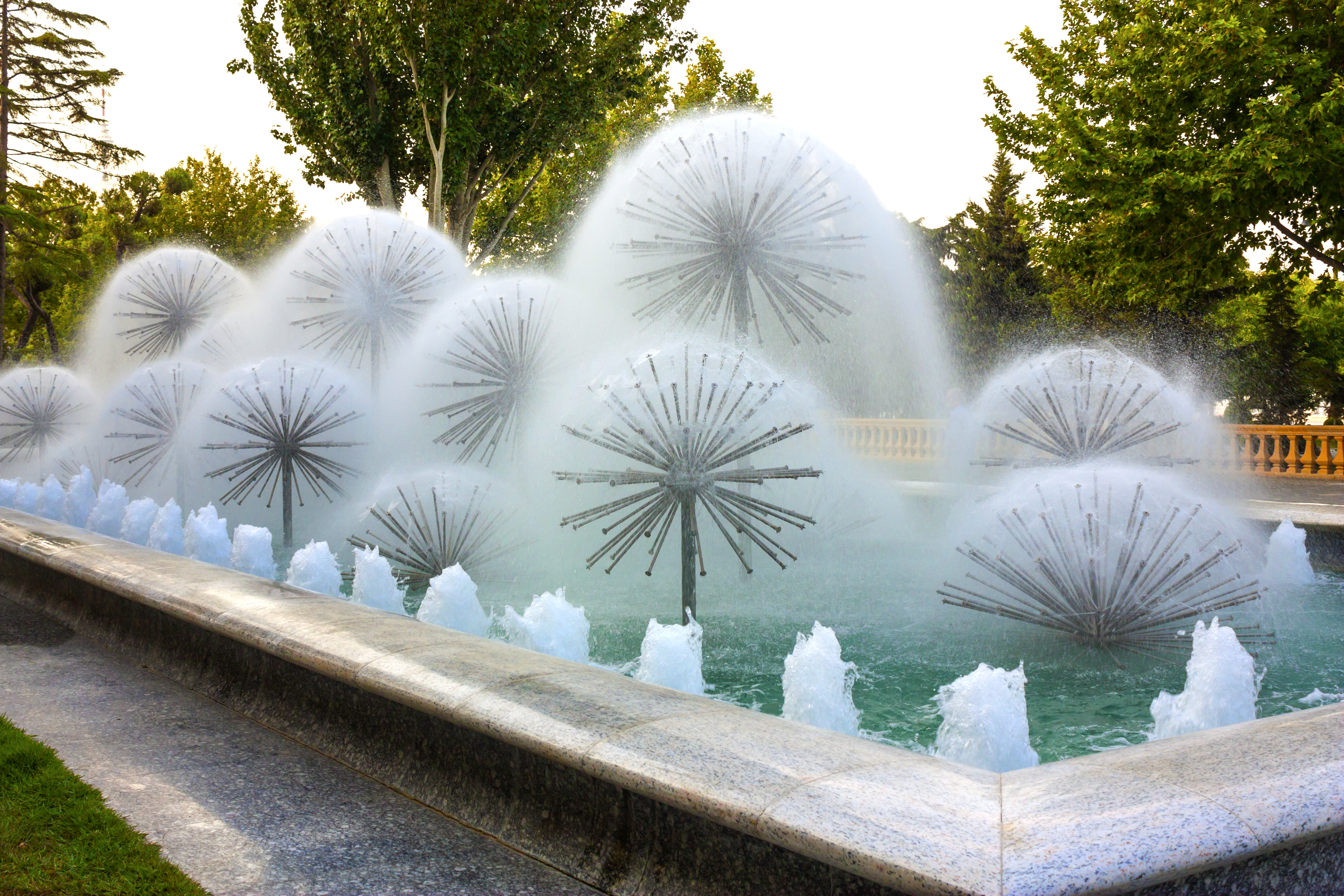
Fountain

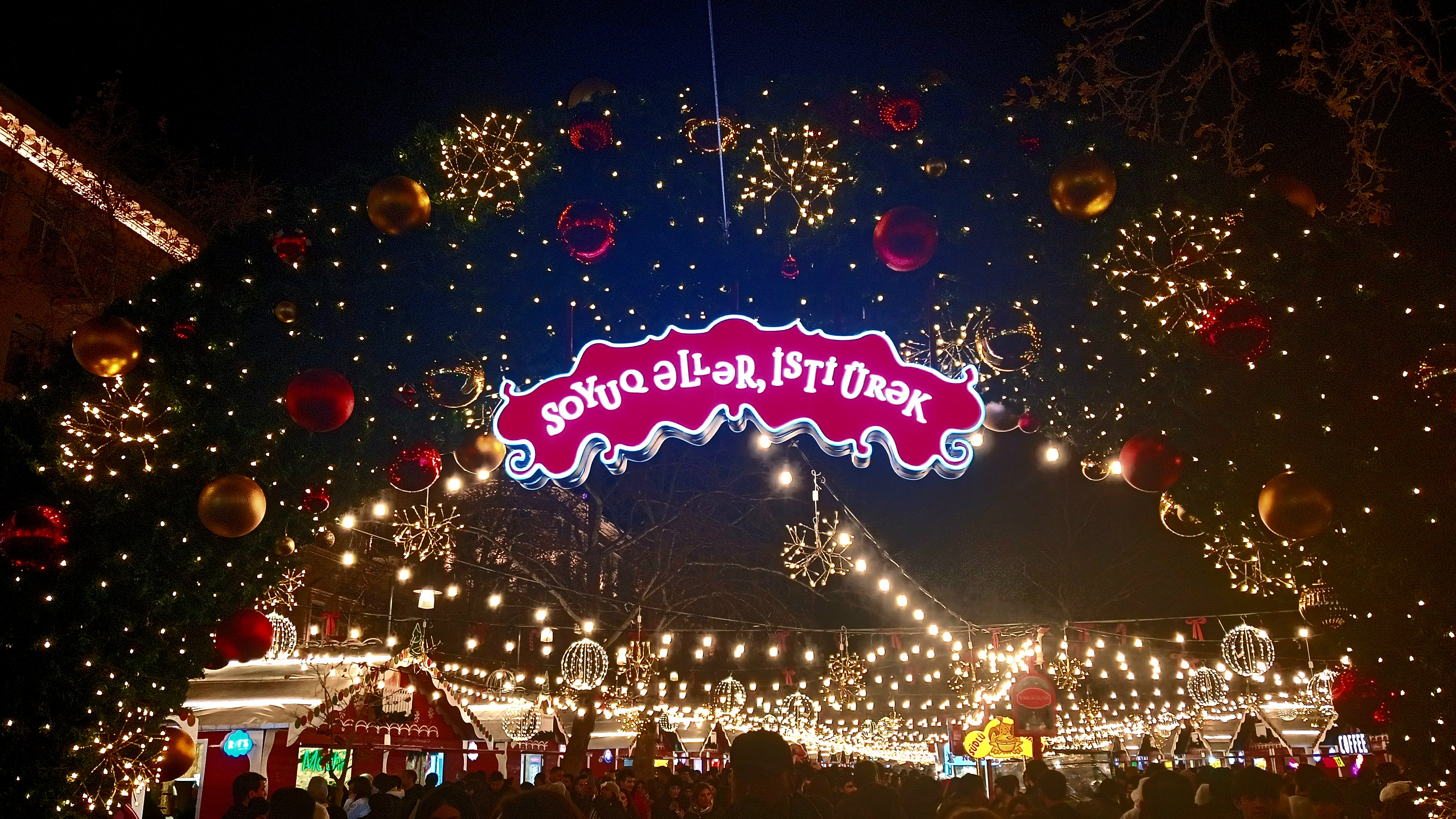
Entrance to the Fountains Square Christmas Market

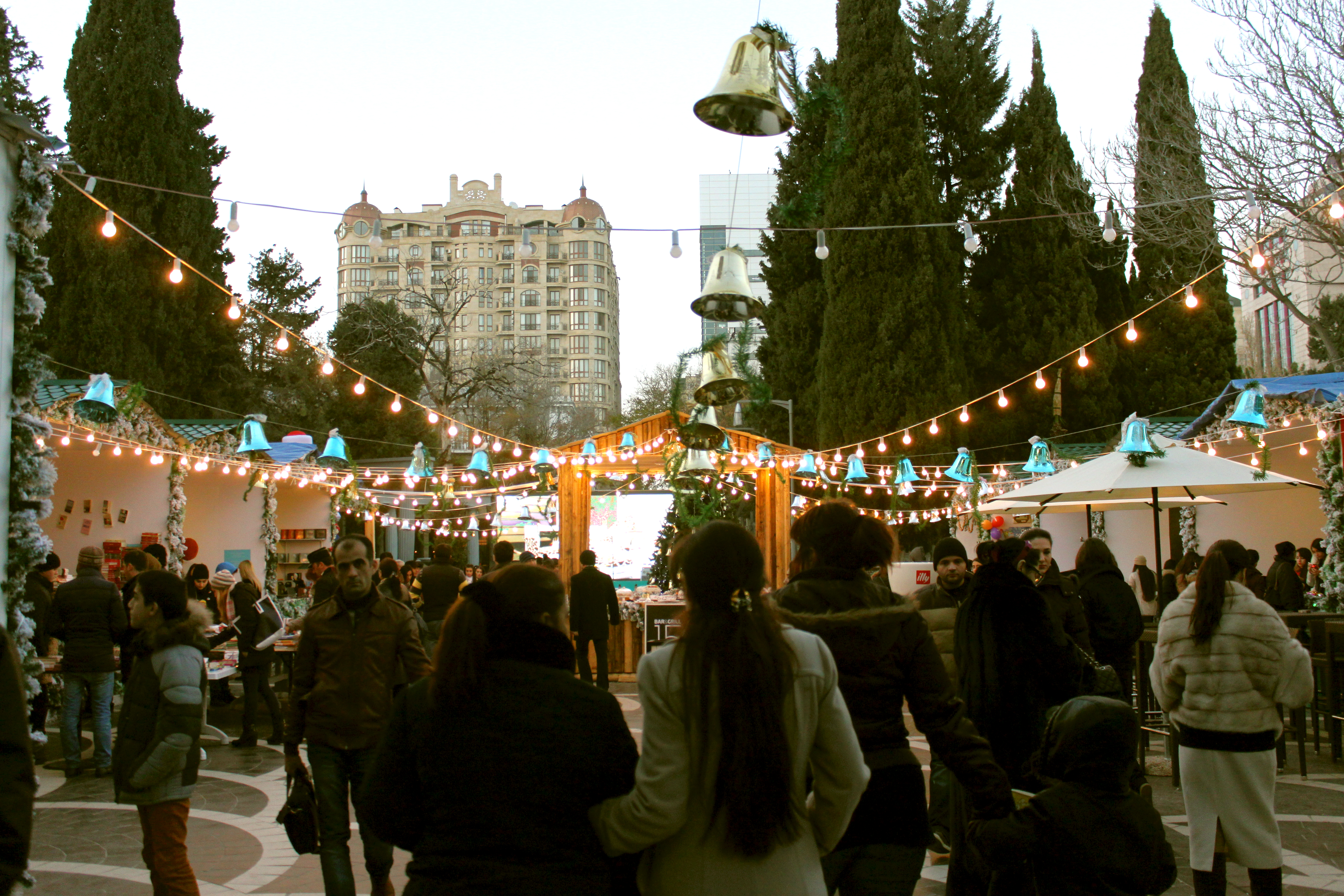
The Fountains Square Christmas Market
