= Söyüdlü, Gadabay =

Söyüdlü
- Municipality
- Location within Azerbaijan
- Coordinates: 40°35′48″N 45°50′15″E
- Country: Azerbaijan
- Rayon: Gadabay

Population
  - Total: 2,372
- Time zone: UTC+4 (AZT)
  - Summer (DST): UTC+5 (AZT)

Söyüdlü (also, Segyutlyu, Sëyudlyu, Sogyutlu, and Sogyutlyu) is a village and municipality in the Gadabay Rayon of Azerbaijan. It has a population of 2,372.

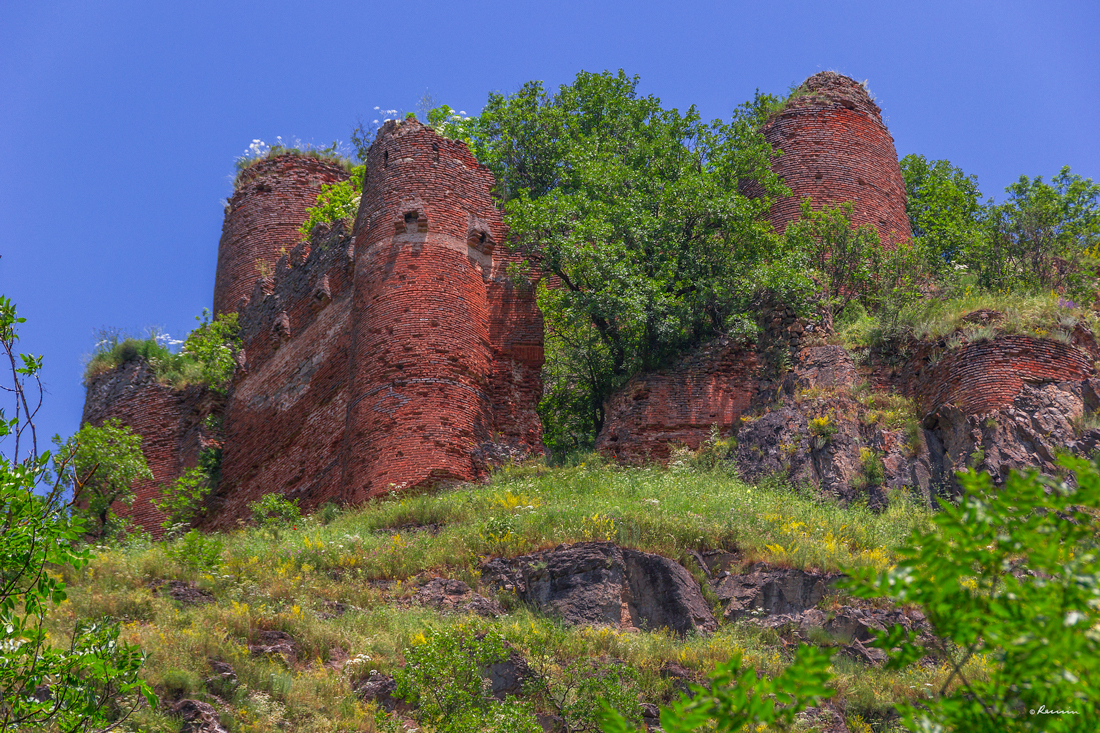
Namerdgala fortress, 12th century. Gedebey, Azerbaijan.

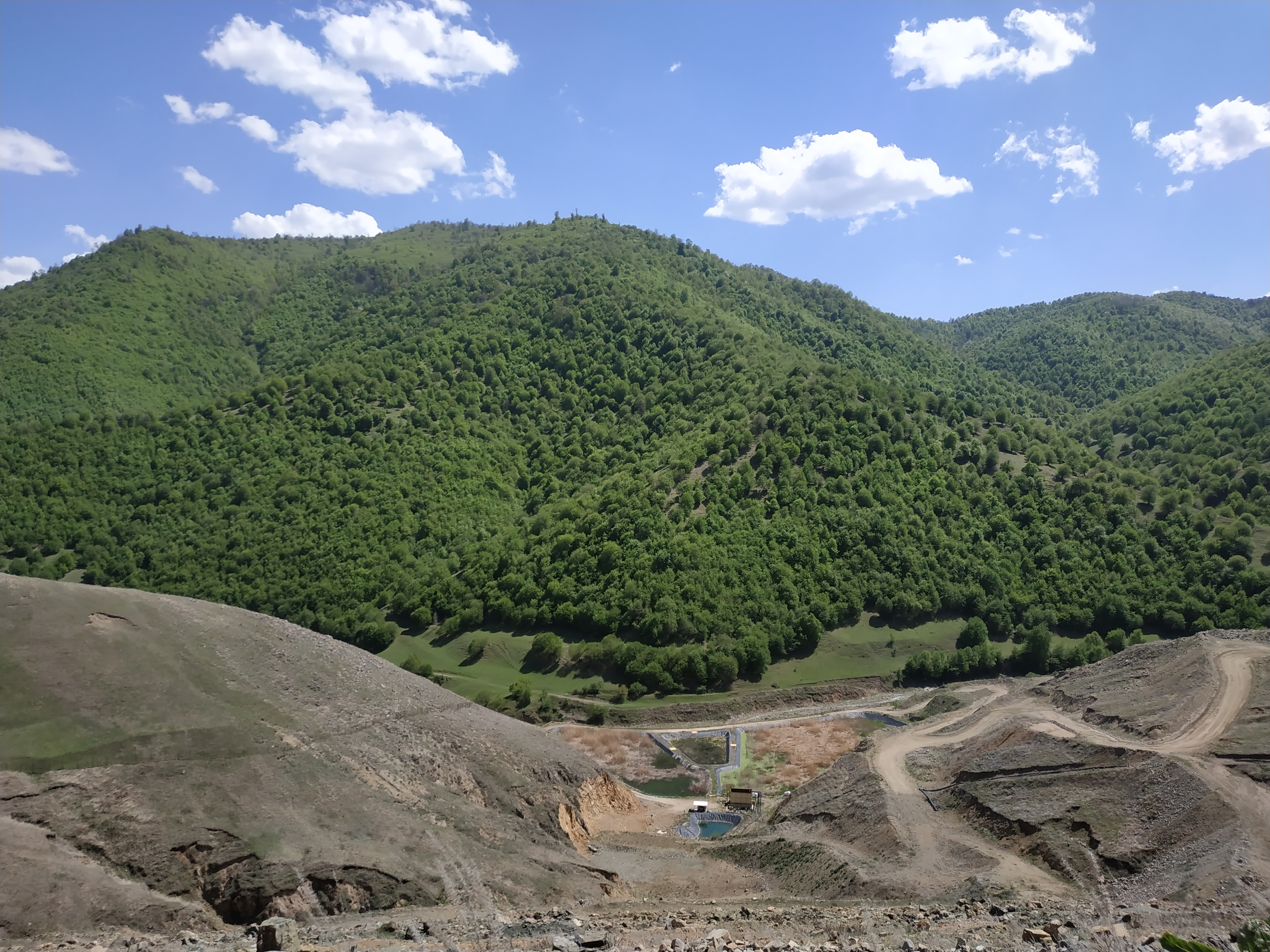
Gadabay region Soyudlu village hillside.

The nearby Gadabay gold mine, in use since 2012, is operated by the British company Anglo Asian Mining. A six million cubic metre tailings pond for the mine, containing arsenic and cyanide, was placed a few hundred metres from Söyüdlü. Residents of the village have said that the toxic waste is poisoning them and their crops. Following protests of the planned installation of a second tailings pond in June 2023, the operation of the mine was temporarily suspended.
