= Novy God =

New Year celebrations in post-Soviet countries

Novy God Новый Год
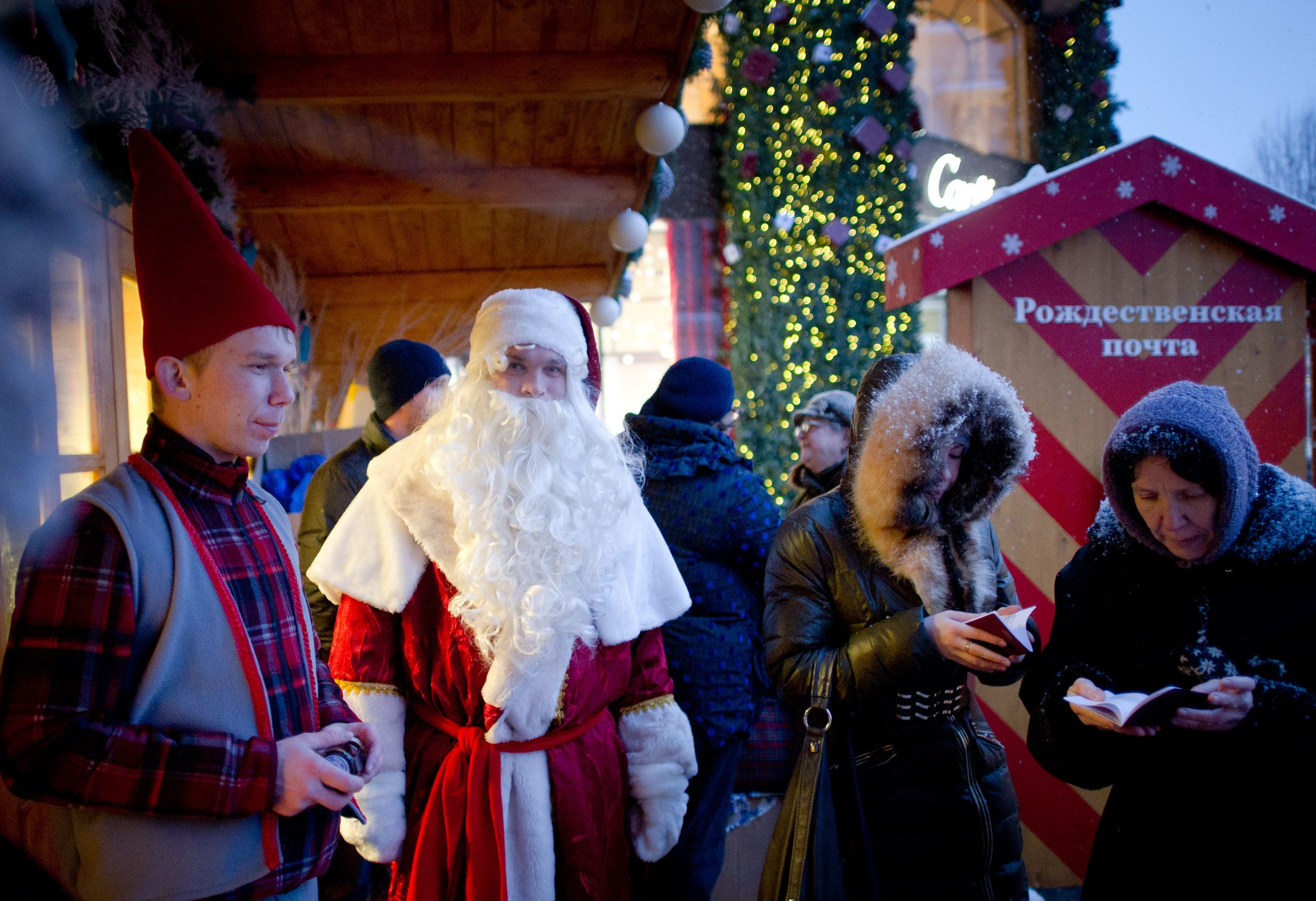
- Ded Moroz at the GUM-Fair, the biggest christmas market in the former Soviet Union
- Also called: Novy Rik, Akhali Ts'eli, Kerla şo, Jaña jıl, Yangi Yil, Täze ýyl, Janı jıl, Saña d'yl, Soli Nav, Anul Nou, Yeni İl, Amanorya
- Observed by: Post-Soviet states
- Type: Secular
- Significance: Commemoration of the New Year
- Celebrations: Gift-giving; late-night partying; family gatherings; feasting; fireworks; countdowns; watchnight services; social gatherings; symbolic decoration; feasting
- Date: 31 December–1 January
- Related to: New Year's Eve, Christmas, Nikolaustag

Novy God (Russian: Новый Год, lit. 'New Year') is a New Year holiday observed primarily in Russia and other post-Soviet states.

The observance was first established by the Soviet Union in the 1930s as a secular alternative to Christmas, stemming from the Communist Party's unofficial policy of state atheism. It incorporates traditions derived from those of Christmas, including gift-giving, decorated trees, and a Santa Claus-like figure—Ded Moroz (Russian: Дед Мороз, lit. 'Grandfather Frost')—who is said to deliver gifts to children on New Year's Eve.

Since the dissolution of the Soviet Union, Novy God has remained a popular observance among Russians and their global diaspora, as well as in post-Soviet territories within Central Asia. Novy God was also observed in the Socialist Federal Republic of Yugoslavia

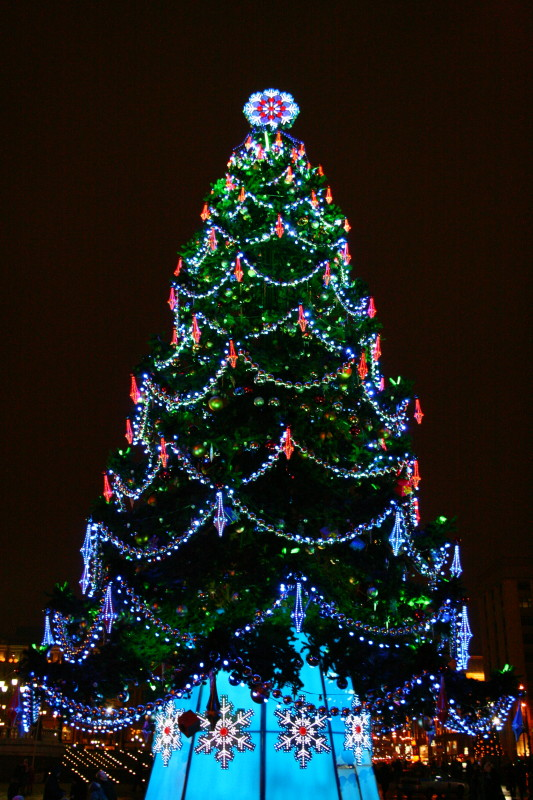
A New Year tree in Moscow in 2007–2008

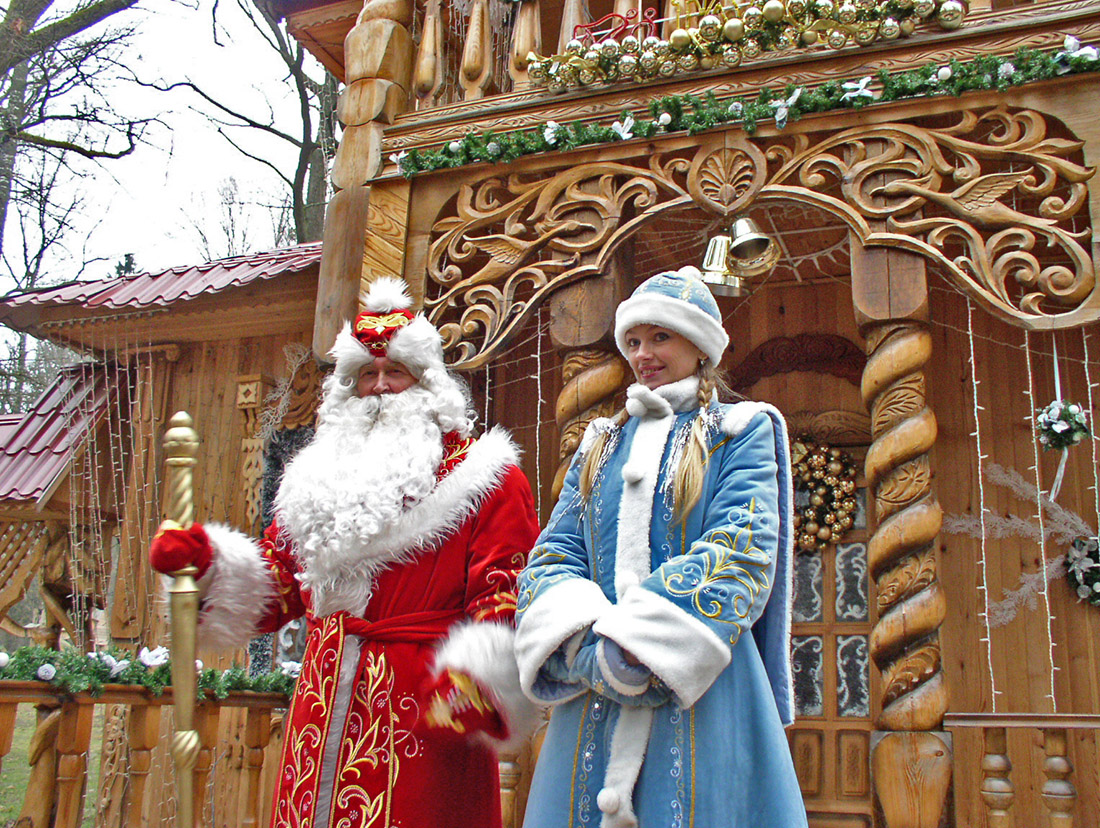
Ded Moroz and Snegurochka in Belarus

== History ==
From AD 1492, the new year was originally celebrated on 1 September as per the Byzantine calendar. In 1699, Peter the Great issued a proclamation adopting the Christian era beginning in 1700 and also changing the celebration of the new year to 1 January. He called for streets to be decorated with the branches of fir, juniper, and pine trees for the holiday. The tradition later evolved into the practice of decorated New Year trees, although their use in homes was hindered by the Slavic superstition of fir trees being associated with funeral rites.

After the October Revolution, Russia adopted the Soviet calendar, which was derived from the Gregorian calendar, in 1918. In 1929, the Communist Party of the Soviet Union abolished all religious holidays, including Christmas, as part of a wider campaign against religion. Soviet officials argued that Christmas was a pagan ritual of sun worship and that the Christmas tree was a bourgeois symbol originating from Germany — one of Russia's World War I enemies.

In December 1935, via a letter published by the party's official newspaper Pravda, politician Pavel Postyshev proposed that the New Year be celebrated as a secular holiday benefiting Soviet youth. The celebration would adopt Christmas traditions in a secular form, including New Year trees (stated to symbolise happiness and prosperity among youth) replacing Christmas trees, and the figure of Ded Moroz (Russian: Дед Мороз, lit. 'Old Man Frost') serving a similar role to Santa Claus.

A tradition of writing and sending greeting postcards to each other for the holidays began (about three million postcards were produced per year). The New Years tree was decorated with a "rain" made of metal foil and "snow" made of cotton wool. New Year's matinees were held in kindergartens. On New Year's Eve, visits to relatives and friends were popular, as well as festivities on streets and ice slides. On television, the Soviet variety show Little Blue Light (Goluboy ogonyok) traditionally ran a special episode on New Year's Eve, New Year's Little Blue Light (Novogodny Goluboy ogonyok), from 1962 to 1985.

The history of the USSR could be traced by the history of New Year tree toys. During The Great Patriotic War, airplanes, soldiers, and ambulance dogs appeared. After 1947, the production of fairy-tale characters, glass fruits and vegetables were established. During Khrushchev period, golden glass corn gained popularity. After the success of the film "Carnival Night", toy "Clocks" appeared — with hands set five minutes before midnight. After the first human flight into space, glass rockets with the inscription "СССР" (USSR) and figurines of cosmonauts began to be released. In the 70s and 80s, glass cones and houses settled on New Year trees, as well as cardboard lanterns (which were good because they did not break).

Even after the dissolution of the Soviet Union and the reinstatement of religious holidays, Novy God has remained a popular celebration in modern Russia, and among Soviet expats living in other countries such as Israel and the United States. Following the success of Channel One's Old Songs about the Main Thing project, the Little Blue Light New Year's Eve special was revived in 1997.

In Ukraine, Novy God was displaced by Christmas after the dissolution of the Soviet Union, and its last vestiges began to be increasingly phased out and demonized amid conflicts between the nation and Russia.

== Traditions ==
Since the era of the Soviet Union, Novy God has usually been considered a gift-giving holiday with similarities to Christmas (albeit in a secular form), with New Year trees (Russian: yolka meaning "spruce") decorated and displayed in homes and public spaces, and Ded Moroz (Russian: Дед Мороз, lit. 'Old Man Frost') depicted as delivering presents to children on New Year's Eve (similar to the Western figure of Santa Claus), with assistance from his granddaughter Snegurochka (Russian: Снегурочка, lit. 'the Snow Maiden'). A residence in the town of Veliky Ustyug has been promoted as Ded Moroz's "home", and children are encouraged to write letters to him. GLONASS promotes a Ded Moroz "tracker" on New Year's Eve, similar to the NORAD Tracks Santa campaign.

Russia-1 televises the annual special Little Blue Light (Russian: Голубой огонёк), which features music and variety acts. Several Soviet films set during the New Year holiday are traditionally aired by Russian broadcasters on and around New Year's Eve, including Carnival Night (1956) and The Irony of Fate (1976). The President's New Year's address is traditionally televised shortly before midnight in each time zone, reflecting on the previous year and the state of the country. At Moscow's Red Square, revellers gather under the Kremlin Clock—whose chimes at midnight are traditionally followed by the playing of the Russian national anthem, and a fireworks display.

Russians often take the week between New Year and Orthodox Christmas (celebrated on 7 January, the Christmas Day according to the Julian Calendar) off (Новогодние каникулы "New Year's holidays"). Unlike Christmas, the Russian New Year uses the Gregorian calendar.

In addition, an informal celebration of the "Old New Year" is observed on the January 13/14 night (in the 20th and 21st centuries), which is the New Year date by the Julian Calendar.

Russian American journalist Leon Neyfakh called Novy God "the most important family holiday of the season for Russians all over the world." The Los Angeles Times reported that "the most essential element of Novy God is family, followed by food as a close second. The extended feast, measured by how much of the table cloth is covered in dishes, begins with appetizers like “shuba” salad... “olivier” salad and “pelmeni” meat dumplings".

== Music ==
Among the most popular works are:

- "A Spruce Was Born in the Forest" (1905)
- "The Little New Year Tree is Сold in Winter" (1935)
- "Five Minutes" (1956) (from the film Carnival Night)
- "Tell Me, Snow Maiden, Where Have You Been" (1974) (from the series Well, Just You Wait!)
- "A Song about a Snowflake" (1982) (from the film Magicians)
- "If There Were no Winter" (1984) (from Winter in Prostokvashino)
- "New Year Toys" (1987)
- "The New Year's One" ("New Year is rushing to us...") (1999)
- "Happy New Year!" (2003) (from Fabrika Zvyozd-3 project)
- "The New Year's One" ("Are you tired of worries...") (2003)
- "White Winter" (2004)
- "This is New Year" (2012) (from The Snow Queen soundtrack)

== In other regions ==
=== Israel ===
In Israel, Novy God (נובי גוד) is celebrated by many first– and second–generation Russian Jewish immigrants from the Soviet Union, with celebrations being particularly prominent in cities with large ex-Soviet populations such as Ashdod, Ashqelon, Beersheba, Netanya, and Haifa. Some customs have been adapted for the Israeli environs; celebrations are usually aligned with Moscow time, and Russians often purchase either fir trees from Arab Christians in the Old City of Jerusalem and Jaffa, or palm trees, for the New Year tree.

New Year's Eve celebrations that are associated with the Gregorian calendar or Christianity are referred to as Silvester to distinguish them from the Jewish New Year of Rosh Hashanah (which takes place 2–3 months earlier). As Pope Sylvester I is considered to have been an antisemite, New Year's Eve celebrations have not been as popular among the Israeli Jew population. Those who celebrate Novy God are sometimes seen as out of line with the national Jewish identity despite the event's lack of religious affiliation, with some having confused it for Christmas or Silvester; amongst ultra-orthodox groups, anti-Novy God flyers and chain letters are common, and in 2004 a bill that would ban the presentation of Christmas iconography in schools was presented to the Knesset.

By the 2010s, the holiday's reputation had begun to improve: workers and Russian Jewish students received the ability to take 1 January off. In the late-2010s, campaigns were undertaken to promote public awareness of the holiday among Israelis and the 1.5 generation, while retail stores began to stock Novy God-related goods and hold sales for the holiday, and Prime Minister Benjamin Netanyahu began to acknowledge the holiday in his greetings.

It is common to allow soldiers of Russian-speaking heritage serving in noncombat facilities to go on leave on the night of the 31st to allow them to celebrate the holiday; however, this is not enforced by official order.

=== Central Asia ===
Novy God customs have also continued to be practiced in post-Soviet states in Central Asia—such as Kyrgyzstan, Tajikistan, and Uzbekistan—that have large Muslim populations. The continued prominence of the holiday in these regions has faced criticism from devout Muslims and other officials, who have considered it inconsistent with their culture and heritage (especially where Russians are an ethnic minority).

In 2012, Uzbekistan briefly banned Novy God characters such as Ded Moroz, although this was lifted in 2014 after the issuance of a fatwa considering New Year celebrations to be "permissible from the point of view of common sense and Sharia law". This ruling was bolstered further by a 2019 sermon by Abdulaziz Mansur. Scholar Bakhtiyar Babadjanov explained that "it is simply that some zealous Islamic leaders need to exploit all this to convert their coreligionists and sow division among the public. That way it is easier to influence them and lead them. The end justifies any means."

=== Yugoslavia ===
After World War II, the Socialist Federal Republic of Yugoslavia (SFR Yugoslavia)—which had been part of the Eastern Bloc—similarly abolished religious holidays (including both Christmas, and the Orthodox New Year on 14 January that is based on the Julian calendar) in favour of customs similar to Novy God, including localized versions of Ded Moroz.

Following the Tito–Stalin split, and more so after the breakup of Yugoslavia, efforts were made in the region to move away from traditions derived from Russian or Soviet culture, including Novy God. Ded Moroz was either adapted or replaced by characters with stronger ties to local culture and folklore, and religious holidays such as Christmas and the Orthodox New Year were reinstated. In Serbia, the Gregorian New Year has co-existed with Christmas and the Orthodox New Year since the breakup. By the 2010s, the festivities on 1 January had become more prevalent in comparison, with 14 January festivities becoming more modest in comparison due to budgetary considerations. In 2013, 14 January was reinstated as a public holiday in Serbia.

=== United States ===
As of 2018, over 80,000 Russian-speaking immigrants in Los Angeles, particularly the San Fernando Valley, celebrate Novy God. These include Ukrainians, Kazakhs, and Russian Jews.

Leon Neyfakh, a Jewish American journalist born in the Soviet Union, described the American celebration as "a secular version of Christmas held six days after the fact" and "a relic of state-mandated atheism in the Soviet Union". He mentions what he thinks major advantages of Novy God over American traditions of Christmas and New Year's Eve: adults' exchange of gifts at midnight (" opening presents while drunk and happy is better than doing so when you’re sleepy and still recovering from last night’s nightmares"), abundant food and its variety (he notes that Nancy Chute gives good overview of the Novy God table.), and celebration at the comfort of home, rather than among strangers: "finding the exact right place to party, the exact right person to stand next to when the ball drops".

== See also ==
- Old New Year
- Ovsen'
