= Eugene Sadowski =

Soviet-American translator and Nazi collaborator (1911–1987)

- Евгений Садовский
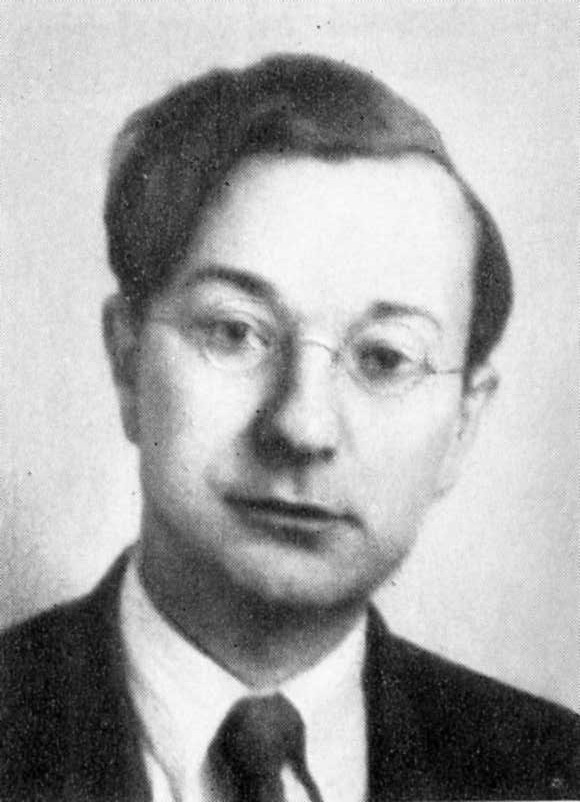
- Born: August 30, 1911; Mariupol, Russian Empire (now Ukraine)
- Died: August 13, 1987 (aged 75); Bedford, Texas, United States
- Known for: Translation, Nazi collaboration

Eugene Ivanovich Sadowski (Note: Russian: Евгений Иванович Садовский, romanized: Yevgeny Ivanovich Sadovsky; Ukrainian: Євген Іванович Садовський, romanized: Yevhen Ivanovych Sadovskyi) (August 30, 1911 – August 1987) was a Ukrainian-born Soviet-American author, translator, Nazi collaborator, and mathematics professor. Lauded by Soviet and Russian authorities as a writer who died during World War II, it was discovered in January 2011 that Sadowski had not died but had instead collaborated with the Germans, where he wrote for Rech in Oryol.

== Early life and literary career ==
Yevgeny Ivanovich Sadovsky was born on August 30, 1911, in the city of Mariupol, then part of the Russian Empire (now located in south-eastern Ukraine) into an ethnically Russian family. According to an autobiography which he dictated to German authorities, he moved to Moscow in 1926, studying and eventually (in 1932) graduating from the German department of the faculty for literary translation at the Institute for New Languages. He described himself as having been fascinated with languages from an early age, and, in addition to his native Ukrainian and Russian, spoke German and some English.

Starting in 1933, Sadowski began work as a translator, working to translate the works of Friedrich Hölderlin into Russian. The process was arduous, taking six years rather than the one year initially expected. He finished his work in 1939, and additionally translated other works from German into Russian, including The Youth of King Henry IV (German: Die Jugend des Königs Henri Quatre; Russian: Юность короля Генриха IV, romanized: Yunost korolya Genrikha IV) by Heinrich Mann. At the same time as his translation work, Sadowski studied at the physics department of Moscow State University and was known to be a skilled chess player.

In 1941, following the beginning of Operation Barbarossa, he was conscripted into the Red Army, where he worked as an interpreter. He was spared from a frontline role due to what he described as "not so strong physique and very serious vision problems." Sadowski claimed in his autobiography that he never joined the Communist Party of the Soviet Union or any of its subsidiary organisations save for the Union of Soviet Writers.

According to documents received by Sadowski's wife from the Soviet Ministry of Defence in 1956, Sadowski went missing on January 27, 1942, near the forests of Smolensk. Soviet historiography claimed Sadowski died at the Battle of Smolensk in 1942. His "death" was followed by high praise from Soviet and East German writers following the World War II, among them Wilhelm Levick, who wrote in 1970, "The last time he was seen was in the Smolensk Oblast, when at night, half-dressed, he ran out of a burning house during a sudden attack by the Nazis. The attack was repulsed ... In his field bag, they found a soldier's certificate, an unfinished letter to his wife, and the same invariable volume of Hölderlin." Johannes R. Becher also celebrated Sadowski, saying in 1943, "A seriously wounded Russian was delivered to the headquarters of a German division. In the pocket of his tunic, a volume of Hölderlin in German was found. During a short interrogation, it turned out that the seriously wounded man was a translator of Hölderlin's poems into Russian. Shortly after the interrogation, he died." Becher often repeated Sadowski's story, alternatively claiming he had died as a result of his wounds or was killed for refusing to join the Germans.

Twenty verses of Sadowski's translations of Rainer Maria Rilke remain stored in the Russian State Archive of Literature and Art, while over 5,000 lines of his translation from Hölderlin remain in the custody of his heirs.

== Collaboration with Nazi Germany ==
However, contrary to Soviet historiography, Sadowski did not die in 1941. Instead, he defected to German forces on January 25, 1942. Following his defection, Sadowski was transferred to Oryol, where he began working for the Rech newspaper under the leadership of Mikhail Oktan. Sadowski was one of seven employees of Rech, along with Oktan, Vladimir Samarin, and individuals named Azbukin, Bogomolov, Petrov, and Sofronova. Sadowski's work, translation of German war reports, was among the most significant of content in Rech, making up over half of the content, though he remained anonymous in his translation.

Sadowski was described by German reports as "politically and culturally very savvy, an intelligent young Russian humanist," but also as "lazy," a characterisation that would later be restated by Russian émigré organisations in the United States. Sadowski was never interned in a prisoner-of-war camp, instead going directly from surrendering to working at Rech on February 19, 1942.

In July 1943, Oryol was recaptured by Soviet forces. Sadowski, along with the rest of Rech, evacuated – first to Bryansk, then Babruysk in what is now eastern Belarus. In Babruysk, Sadowski was contacted by Alfred Rosenberg, who sought him out as part of the Reichsleiter Rosenberg Taskforce occupied with collecting information about the Soviet Union. Sadowski first moved to Minsk, and then to Upper Silesia. In Upper Silesia, he was recruited for the Weltdienst press service, with his knowledge of communism and antisemitism being noted. At some point near the war's end, Sadowski evacuated to Frankfurt.

== Life in the United States and death ==
After the war, Sadowski remained in the American occupation zone in Germany, where he participated in chess tournaments in displaced persons camps. He used the pseudonym of Saltovskis (Russian: Салтовскис), and was interned in Meerbeck. In August 1949, he left Germany for the United States aboard the General Heinzelman, being described in documentation as a "translator/teacher". Following his emigration, he lived in Washington, D.C.. He was issued a Social Security number in 1952.

In the United States, Sadowski became a mathematician, joining the American Mathematical Society in 1964 and moving to Florida in the early 1960s. He became a professor at the University of Miami. At the same time, he translated into English several mathematics materials from the Soviet Union, and was active in local chess championships.

Sadowski died in August 1987 in Bedford, Texas.
