= Joseph Bédier =

French philologist and writer (1864–1938)

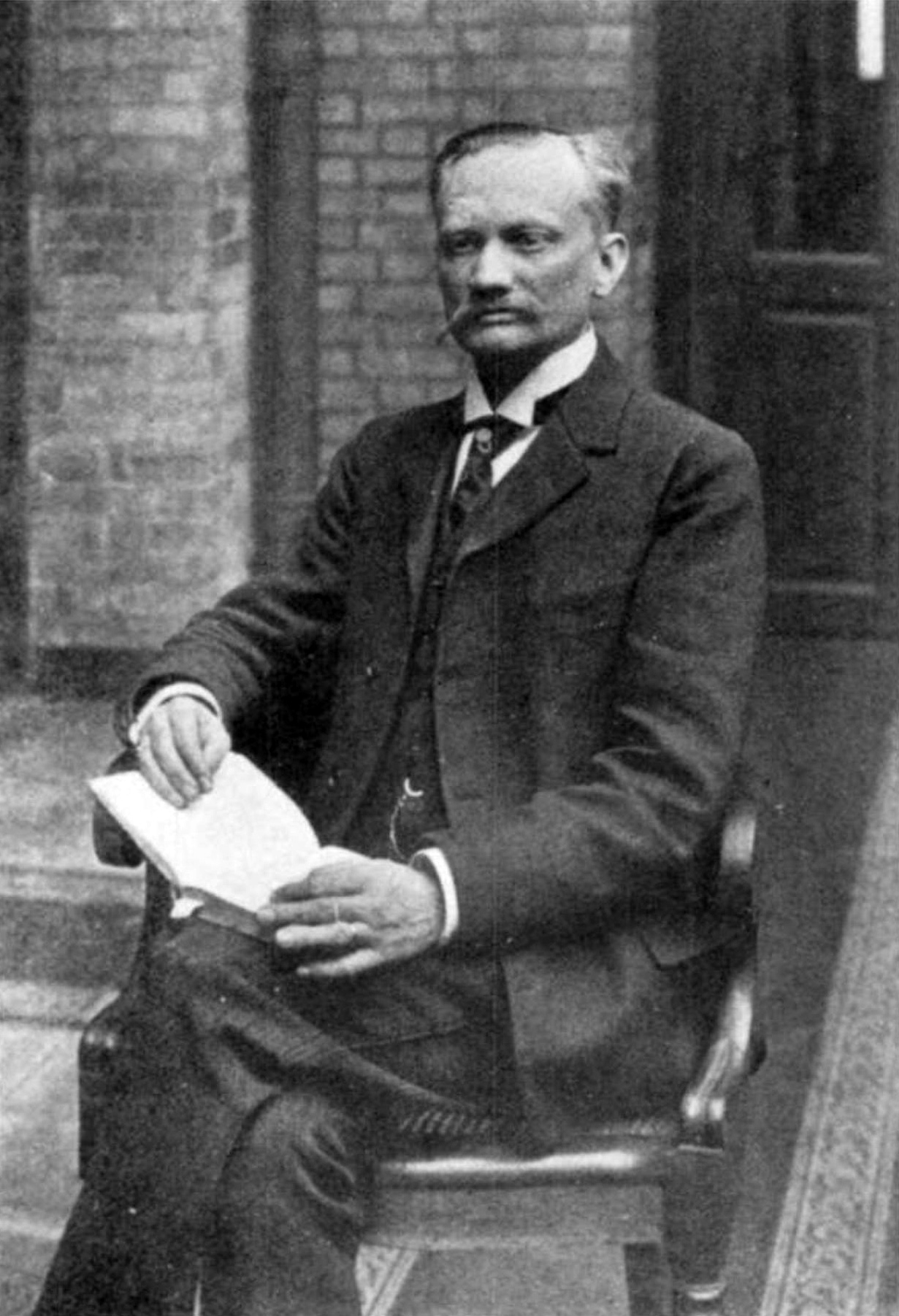
- Born: 28 January 1864; Paris, France
- Died: 29 August 1938 (aged 74); Le Grand-Serre, France
- Occupations: writer; historian

Academic work
- Institutions: Université de Fribourg; Collège de France
- Main interests: Medieval France
- Notable works: Littérature française

Joseph Bédier (28 January 1864 – 29 August 1938) was a French writer and historian of medieval France.

== Biography ==
Bédier was born in Paris, France, to Adolphe Bédier, a lawyer of Breton origin, and spent his childhood in Réunion. He was a professor of medieval French literature at the Université de Fribourg, Switzerland (1889–1891) and the Collège de France, Paris (c. 1893).

Bédier revived interest in several important old French texts, including Tristan et Iseut (1900), La chanson de Roland (1921), and Les fabliaux (1893). He was a member of the Académie française from 1920 until his death.

His Le roman de Tristan et Iseut was translated into Cornish by A. S. D. Smith, into English by Hilaire Belloc and Paul Rosenfeld, and into German by Rudolf G. Binding. In 2013, a new English translation by Edward J. Gallagher was published by Hackett Publishing Company.

Bédier was also joint editor of the two-volume Littérature française, one of the most valuable modern general histories of French literature. He was elected a Foreign Honorary Member of the American Academy of Arts and Sciences in 1929 and an International Member of the American Philosophical Society in 1937.

Bédier died in Le Grand-Serre, France. He was awarded the Grand-Croix de la Legion d'honneur in 1937.

== Works ==
- Le lai de l’ombre (1890)
- Le fabliau de Richeut (1891)
- Les fabliaux, études de littérature populaire et d’histoire littéraire du Moyen Âge (1893)
- De Nicolao Museto (gallice Colin Muset), francogallico carminum scriptore (1893)
- Le roman de Tristan et Iseut (1900)
- Le roman de Tristan par Thomas (2 vol., 1902–1905)
- Études critiques (1903)
- Les deux poèmes de la folie Tristan (1907)
- Légendes épiques, recherches sur la formation des chansons de geste (1908–1913)
- Les chansons de croisade (1909)
- Les chansons de Colin Muset (1912)
- Les crimes allemands d’après les témoignages allemands (1915)
- Comment l’Allemagne essaie de justifier ses crimes? (1915)
- Joseph Bédier and Paul Hazard: Histoire de la littérature francaise. 2 Vol. (1923/24)
- L’effort français (1919)
- La chanson de Roland (critical edition, 1920)
- La chanson de Roland (after the Oxford manuscript, 1922)
- Commentaires sur la chanson de Roland (1927)

=== Use of military diaries ===
Bédier used the war diaries (German: Kriegstagebücher) of German soldiers of different military ranks in World War I as a source for various articles dealing with what he describes as atrocities inflicted upon Belgian civilians and French soldiers, the phenomenon of Schrecklichkeit. Some of these diaries had been kept for military reasons, in order to provide daily accounts of troop movements, orders, engagements, losses etc.; others were private diaries. From them Bédier connected together accounts of thirty-six incidents of what he saw as sexual and sadistic crimes by the German soldiers.

=== Uses ===
The Swiss composer Frank Martin set chapters from Le roman de Tristan et Iseut to music as Le Vin herbé. Conceived as an oratorio for 12 vocalists, seven strings and piano, the work premiered in concert in 1942 in Zurich. A scenic production, translated by Martin himself into German, titled Der Zaubertrank, was first performed at the Salzburg Festival in 1948.
