= Fabliau =

Comic, typically anonymous, ribald French tale (1150-1400)

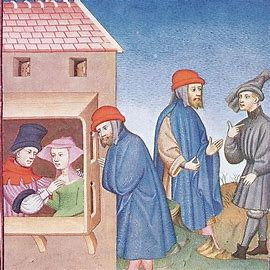
An image from a manuscript likely depicting 'the priest that peeked'

A fabliau (French pronunciation: [fabljo]; plural fabliaux) is a comic, often anonymous tale written by jongleurs and clerics in France between c. 1150 and 1400. They are generally characterized by sexual and scatological obscenity, and by a set of contrary attitudes generally critical or mocking of the church and nobility. While most fabliaux were anonymous, some authors like Jean Bodel or Guèrin, who wrote during the peak of the genre's popularity, are known. Several of them were reworked by Giovanni Boccaccio for the Decameron and by Geoffrey Chaucer for The Canterbury Tales. Some 150 French fabliaux are extant, the number depending on how narrowly fabliau is defined. According to R. Howard Bloch, fabliaux are the first expression of literary realism in Europe.

Some nineteenth-century scholars, most notably Gaston Paris, argue that fabliaux originally came from the Orient and were brought to the West by returning crusaders.

== Context ==
The time that the fabliaux were most popular in France was during the 13th and 14th centuries. During this time, France faced a lot of change and devastation, with continuous bad weather leading to massive famines at the end of the 13th century and into the 14th century. Along with other diseases and sicknesses, the black death came to France during this time.

It is believed that Fabliaux derived from Courtly Love, which was a popular genre at the time. Jongleurs and troubadours were French poets who are thought to have created some of the stories that started the genre. They would tell these stories in front of Kings and courts as entertainment. Although it is also believed that some of the stories were written by peasants for peasants. It is now often agreed upon that the tales were for everyone. Many people at this time were illiterate, and the stories were told to the community by some who could read or by someone who memorized the tales.

The first of these tales tells stories that are dirty yet entertaining, from a modern view it can be shocking that these tales were written in a primarily Christian culture. When the tales were rediscovered in the 1800s, people were appalled at them and believed that they were embarrassing and wanted to distance France as far as possible from the tales. It turned into anti-semitic propaganda as stories like these existed in Latin and Arabic before Old French. They blamed the Jews as the reason for the stories because they knew multiple languages.

== History and definition of the genre ==
The fabliau is defined as a short narrative in (usually octosyllabic) verse, between 300 and 400 lines long, its content is often comic or satiric. In France, it flourished in the 12th and 13th centuries; in England, it was popular in the 14th century. Fabliaux are often compared to the later short story; Douglas Bush, longtime professor at Harvard University, called it "a short story broader than it is long." Even though serving as short bawdy poetry, Fabliaux reflected the social disorder during its time. The time period underwent many changes marked by political instability, religious disputes, crusade wars, and the decline of a feudal system. Through humor and explicit language fabliaux was a medieval entertainment that mocked the flaws of society.

The fabliau is remarkable in that it seems to have no direct literary predecessor in the West, but was brought from the East by returning crusaders in the 12th century. Fabliaux were most famous in the courts. Popular amongst knights, noblemen, lords, and ladies, a very aristocratic group of individuals. Those accompanying those in the courts would be entertainers. Troubadours, who were poets and musicians. They sang love songs in Occitan poetry that was influenced by Arabic and Hebrew poetry. Fabliaux started as courtly love, where poets would express overwhelming love for a married noblewoman; yet she would be unattainable. As knights and nobles began to merge into one class, knights began to examine moral issues that came with their role. They begin to value chivalry, celebrating the arms of war, yet also exploring aspects of love and courting women Chivalry tales and epic poetry morphed into romance literature. Starting as an oral tradition, but began to be written down. Courtly love spread from Southern France to Italy, Northern France, England, and Germany. The translations changed minnesinger (love singer) in Germany, and the trouvere sang in old French in France. Actual fabliaux derived from northern France poetry. Fabliaux provided a more realistic aspect of human life.

The closest literary genre is the fable, as found in Aesop "and its eastern origins or parallels," but it is less moral and less didactic than the fable. The word is a northern French diminutive from fable.." In terms of morality it is suggested to be closer to the novel than to the parable: "the story is the first thing, the moral the second, and the latter is never suffered to interfere with the former." Still, according to Robert Lewis, "some two-thirds of the French fabliaux have an explicit moral attached to them."

The earliest known fabliau is the anonymous Richeut (c. 1159–1175); one of the earliest known writers of fabliaux is Rutebeuf, "the prototype of the jongleur of medieval literature."

The genre has been quite influential: passages in longer medieval poems such as Le Roman de Renart as well as tales found in collections like Giovanni Boccaccio's Decameron and Geoffrey Chaucer's Canterbury Tales have their origin in one or several fabliaux. Additionally, the medieval church also found use for the fabliau form. Noting its popularity, the church turned to their own form of minstrelsy similar to the fabliau that espoused "worthy thoughts" rather than the "ribaldry" a more typical fabliau would couch its moral in.

When the fabliau gradually disappeared, at the beginning of the 16th century, it was replaced by the prose short story, which was greatly influenced by its predecessor. Famous French writers such as Molière, Jean de La Fontaine, and Voltaire owe much to the tradition of the fabliau.

=== Cast of characters, audience ===
Typical fabliaux contain a vast array of characters, including cuckolded husbands, rapacious clergy, and foolish peasants, as well as beggars, connivers, thieves, and whores. The clergy, in particular, are a group who are often singled out for criticism. The enforcement of clerical celibacy at the Second Lateran Council of 1139 caused many lay people to think differently about their local priest's marriages. As a result, taboo characters such as the adultering priest in Guerin's “The Priest Who Peeked” and the priest who drowned after being caught with the wife of a knight in “The Fisherman from Pont-sur-Seine” are extremely humorous to 12th and 13th century audiences. The status of peasants also appears to vary, based on the audience for which the fabliau was being written. Poems that were presumably written for the nobility portray peasants (vilains in French) as stupid and vile, whereas those written for the lower classes often tell of peasants getting the better of the clergy.

The subversion of expected gender roles is also a common theme within fabliaux. For example, in the story “Berangier of the Long Ass” a woman tricks her cowardly husband by dressing as a knight and confronting him. He begs for forgiveness, not recognizing his wife, and, by her request, kisses her bottom to make amends. The irony here not only comes from his mistaking of female genitals as a “long ass”, but also that the woman has served justice to her husband by forcing him to submit to her and putting herself in a dominant role.

The audience for fabliaux is estimated differently by different critics. Joseph Bédier suggests a bourgeois audience, which sees itself reflected in the urban settings and lower-class types portrayed in fabliaux. On the other hand, Per Nykrog argues that fabliaux were directed towards a noble audience, and concludes that fabliaux were that they made have been the same audience consuming courtly literature. This is reflected by the fact that the status of peasants appears to vary, based on the audience for which the fabliau was being written. Poems that were presumably written for the nobility portray peasants (vilains in French) as stupid and vile, whereas those written for the lower classes often tell of quick-witted and clever peasants getting the better of the clergy. For example, in the well-known fabliau “The Butcher of Abbeville”, a butcher is invited into a priest's home to dine, and deceives him by stealing his livestock and sleeping with the maid.

=== Subject matter ===
The subject matter is often sexual: fabliaux are concerned with the elements of love left out by poets who wrote in the more elevated genres such as Ovid, who suggests in the Ars Amatoria (II.704–5) that the Muse should not enter the room where the lovers are in bed; and Chrétien de Troyes, who maintains silence on the exact nature of the joy discovered by Lancelot and Guinevere in Le Chevalier de la Charrette (4676–4684). Lais and fabliaux have much in common; an example of a poem straddling the fence between the two genres is "Lecheor".

Fabliaux derive a lot of their force from puns and other verbal figures; "fabliaux . . . are obsessed with wordplay." Especially important are paranomasia and catachresis, tropes which disrupt ordinary signification and displace ordinary meanings—by similarity of sound, for instance, one can have both "con" and "conte" ("cunt" and "tale") in the same word, a common pun in fabliaux.

Humor is a main purpose served by fabliaux, as mentioned in Joseph Bedier's 1925 definition of the genre as verse tales meant for laughter, “contes à rire en vers” This definition has been largely sufficient for many scholars of fabliaux, although there is some debate on whether entertainment is the main purpose of the stories, or rather an outlet through which to teach a lesson to the audience.

=== Form ===
The standard form of the fabliau is that of Medieval French literature in general, the octosyllable rhymed couplet, the most common verse form used in verse chronicles, romances (the romans), lais, and dits. They are generally short, a few hundred lines; Douin de L'Avesne's Trubert, at 2984 lines, is exceptionally long.

== Authors and tales ==
Famous writers of fabliaux include Jean Bodel, Guèrin, Gautier le Leu, Rutebeuf, Enguerrant le Clerc d'Oisi and Douin de L'Avesne.

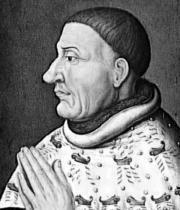
Jean Bodel

=== "Browny, the Priest's Cow" ===
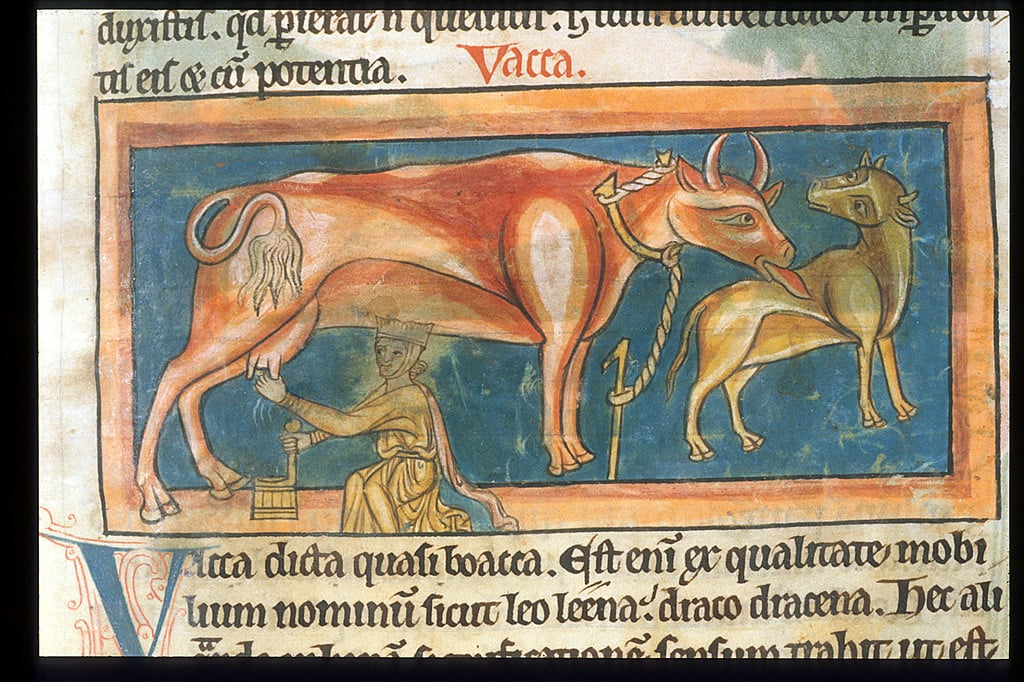
Illustration of a cow from a 13th century manuscript

Browny, the Priest's Cow was written by Jean Bodel in the early 1200s. In the story, a farmer and his wife take a pastor's sermon very seriously, and offer their only cow to the church because they believe that God will return what they have given to him twofold. The pastor, deciding to take advantage of the peasant's gift, accepts and puts the cow in the pasture with his own cow, Browny. The two animals are tied together until the farmer's cow gets used to the boundaries of the field, until she becomes restless and decides to go home. Thanks to the lead, she takes Browny along with her. The Farmer and his wife are rewarded with the return of their cow and a second, fatter and more plentiful cow, while the priest is punished for his greed by losing his prized cow. It's heavily critical of the church and its tithing, something that became a staple of fabliaux.

=== "Gombert et les deus clers" ===
A well-known storyline is found in "Gombert et les deus clers" ("Gombert and the two clerks"). It was also written by Jean Bodel in the 1200s, and was likely adapted from earlier folklore. Two traveling clerks (students) take up lodging with a villain, and share the bedroom with Gombert, his beautiful wife, and their two children—one teenage girl, and one baby. One of the clerks climbs into bed with the teenage daughter and, promising her his ring, has his way with her; the other, while Gombert is "ala pissier" ("gone pissing", 85), moves the crib with the baby so that Gombert, on his return, lies down in the bed occupied by the clerks—one of whom is in bed with his daughter, while the other is now having sex with Gombert's wife, who thinks it is Gombert come to pleasure her. When the first clerk returns to his bed where he thinks his friend still is, he tells Gombert all about his adventure: "je vien de fotre / mes que ce fu la fille a l'oste" ("I've just been fucking, and if it wasn't the host's daughter", 152–53). Gombert attacks the first clerk, but ends up being beaten up by both.

The tale is found practically unchanged in Boccaccio's Decameron and in Chaucer's "The Reeve's Tale".

=== "L'enfant de neige" ===
In "L'enfant de neige" ("The snow baby"), a black comedy, a merchant returns home after an absence of two years to find his wife with a newborn son. She explains one snowy day she swallowed a snowflake while thinking about her husband, which caused her to conceive. Pretending to believe the "miracle", they raise the boy until the age of 15 when the merchant takes him on a business trip to Genoa. There, he sells the boy into slavery. On his return, he explains to his wife that the sun burns bright and hot in Italy; since the boy was begotten by a snowflake, he melted in the heat.

=== "Bérangier au lonc cul" (Bérangier of the long arse) ===
"De Bérangier au lonc cul" is a medieval French fabliau. There are two versions of the fabliau: one by Guèrin and one anonymous. In summary, the story begins when a rich earl marries his daughter off to a "young peasant" and deems him a knight. The knight abandons the code of chivalry and lazes around for the first ten years of the marriage. When his wife, tired of his demeaning attitude and lazy nature, speaks of the greatness of the knights in her family, the husband decides to prove himself a worthy knight. He dresses in armor and goes into the forest on horseback. Once in the forest, he hangs his shield on the lowest branch of a tree and beats it until it looks as if it endured a great battle. The knight returns to his wife, shows her his bruised armor, and gloats about his victories. After a few trips into the forest, the wife begins to wonder why the knight himself is unscathed while his armor is in shambles. The next day, she suggests he take servants with him. When he refuses, the lady dresses in a full body suit of armor and follows him into the forest. When she sees him beating his own shield, she steps into sight and threatens to kill him for his dishonor to chivalry. The knight does not recognize his wife's voice. He begs for "pity" and offers to do anything to avoid conflict. His wife, disguised as a mighty knight, gives him the option of jousting her, in which he will surely die, or kissing her arse. Out of cowardice, the knight chooses to kiss her arse. She hops off her horse and pulls down her pants. While the knight should have recognized her female genitalia, he remarks that she has a long arse. Before she leaves, she tells him, "I'm Bérangier of the Long Ass, Who puts shame to the chickenhearted." The wife returns home and sleeps with a valiant knight. When her husband arrives from the forest, he rebukes her. However, that was his last demeaning remark to her. She tells him she met Bérangier and learned of her husband's cowardice. To protect his own name, the knight is forced to succumb to his wife's wishes. Her cleverness leads her to do as she pleased for the rest of her life, and her husband lives in shame.

=== Other examples ===
Other popular fabliaux include:

- "La vielle qui graissa la patte de chevalier" ("The old woman who paid the knight for favors.")
- "Le Pauvre Clerc" ("The poor clerk")
- "Le Couverture partagée" ("The shared covering")
- "Le Pretre qui mangea les mûres" ("The priest who ate mulberries")
- "La crotte" ("The turd")
- "Le Chevalier qui fit les cons parler" ("The Knight who made cunts speak") by Guèrin
- (Dit de) La vieille Truande ("The old beggar woman")
- "Du prestre ki abevete" ("The priest who peeked") by Guèrin
- "La Bataille de Caresme et de Charnage" ("The Fight Between Carnival and Lent")

== See also ==
- Anglo-Norman literature
- Medieval literature
- Aarne–Thompson classification system
- Motif-Index of Folk-Literature

== Bibliography ==
- M. H. Abrams (1985). "Fabliau". A Glossary of Literary Terms (6 ed.). Harcourt Brace. p. 63. ISBN 978-0-03-054982-3.
- Balachov, Nicolas (1984). "Le developpement des structures narratives du fabliau a la nouvelle". In Gabriel Bianciotto, Michel Salvat (ed.). Épopée animale, fable, fabliau. Publication Univ Rouen Havre. pp. 30–38. ISBN 978-2-13-038255-3.
- Bedier, Joseph (1969). Les Fabliaux. Paris.
- Bull, Marcus (2002). France in the Middle Ages. Oxford.
- Burgess, Glyn S.; Leslie C. Brook (1999). "Three Old French Narrative Lays: Trot, Lecheor, Nabaret" (PDF). liv.ac.uk. University of Liverpool, Department of French.
- Burrows, Daron (2005). The Stereotype of the Priest in the Old French Fabliaux: Anticlerical Satire and Lay Identity. Peter Lang. ISBN 978-3-03910-072-9.
- Cole, William. First and Otherwise Notable Editions of Medieval French Texts Printed from 1742 to 1874: A Bibliographical Catalogue of My Collection. Sitges: Cole & Contreras, 2005.
- Cuddon, John Anthony; Claire Preston (1999). "Fabliau". The Penguin Dictionary of Literary Terms and Literary Theory (4 ed.). Penguin. p. 301. ISBN 978-0-14-051363-9.
- Dubby, George (1991). France in the Middle Ages. Blackwell Publishers.
- Dubin, Nethanial; Howard Bloch (2013). The Fabliau: A New Verse Translation. Liverright Publishing.
- Eichmann, Raymond, ed. (1982). Cuckolds, Clerics, & Countrymen: Medieval French Fabliaux. Translated by DuVal, John. Fayetteville: University of Arkansas Press. ISBN 978-0-938626-06-0. OCLC 7795232 – via Internet Archive.
- "Fabliau". Columbian cyclopedia. Vol. 11. Garretson, Cox & Company. 1897. pp. 420–21.
- "Fabliau". Merriam-Webster's encyclopedia of literature. Merriam-Webster. 1995. p. 399. ISBN 978-0-87779-042-6.
- Gosse, Edmund William (1910). "Fabliau" . In Chisholm, Hugh (ed.). Encyclopædia Britannica. Vol. 10 (11th ed.). Cambridge University Press. pp. 116–117.
- Hellman, Robert; Richard F. O'Gorman (1965). Fabliaux: Ribald Tales from the Old French. Crowell. ISBN 0-8371-7414-7.
- Huot, Sylvia (2003). Madness in Medieval French Literature: Identities Found and Lost. Oxford: Oxford University Press. pp. 47–48. ISBN 978-0-19-925212-1.
- Ramey, Lynn (2024). An introduction to Jean Bodel. University Press of Florida.
- Ramey, Lynn (2002). Jean Bodel's Jeu de Saint Nicolas: A Call for Non-Violent Crusade. University of Pennsylvania Press.
- Rosenwien, Barbara (2009). A Short History of the Middle Ages. University of Toronto Press.
- Le Grand, M. (1815). Fabliaux or Tales, Abridged from French Manuscripts of the XIIth and XIIIth Centuries. J.Rodwell.
- Matthews, William (1975). "The Wife of Bath and All Her Sect". Viator. 5: 413–45. doi:10.1484/J.VIATOR.2.301632. ISBN 978-0-520-02602-5.
- McDougall, Sarah (2013). The Making of Marriage in Medieval France. Journal of Family History.
- Nicholson, Helen (1999). "The Knight who received an unusual gift". freespace.virgin.net. Archived from the original on 5 August 2009.
- Noomen, Willem; van den Boogaard, Nico, eds. (1988). Nouveau Recueil Complet des Fabliaux (NRCF) (in French). France: Van Gorcum & co. ISBN 90-232-1975-9.
- Nykrog, Per (1973). Les fabliaux. Geneva: Droz. ISBN 978-2600028233.
- Root, Jerry (1997). "The Old French Fabliau and the Poetics of Disfiguration". Medievalia et Humanistica. New series. 24. Medieval and Renaissance Society: 17–32. ISBN 978-0-8476-8674-2.
- Rossi, Luciano; Richard Straub (1992). Fabliaux Erotiques: Textes de jongleurs des XIIe et XIIIe siècles. Livre de Poche. ISBN 978-2-253-06001-7.
- Simpson, J.R. (1996). Animal Body, Literary Corpus: The Old French "Roman de Renart". Amsterdam: Rodopi. p. 52. ISBN 978-90-5183-976-0.
