= De Bérangier au lonc cul =

De Bérangier au lonc cul is a medieval French fabliau. There are two versions of the fabliau: one by Guèrin and one anonymous.

== Summary ==
The story begins when a rich earl marries his daughter off to a young peasant and makes him a knight. For the first ten years of the marriage, the knight lazes around, ignoring the code of chivalry. When his wife, tired of his lazy attitude, speaks of the greatness of the knights in her family, the husband decides to prove himself worthy. He dresses in armour and goes into the forest on horseback. Once in the forest, he hangs his shield on a tree and beats it until it looks as if it has been in a great battle. The knight returns to his wife, shows her his battered armour, and brags about his victories. After a few such trips, the wife begins to wonder why the knight himself is unscathed, unlike his armour. The next day, she suggests he take servants with him. When he refuses, the lady dresses in armour and follows him into the forest. When she sees him beating his own shield, she threatens to kill him for his dishonourable actions. The knight does not recognize his wife's voice. He begs for pity and offers to do anything to avoid a fight. His wife, disguised as a knight, gives him the option of jousting with her, in which he will surely die, or kissing her arse. Out of cowardice, the knight chooses to kiss her arse. She climbs off her horse and pulls down her trousers. While the knight should have recognized her female genitalia, he remarks that she has a long arse. Before she leaves, she tells him, "I'm Bérangier of the Long Arse, / Who puts shame to the faint hearted." The wife returns home and sleeps with a valiant knight. When her husband arrives from the forest, he rebukes her. However, that was his last demeaning remark to her. She tells him she met Bérangier and learned of her husband's cowardice. To protect his name, the knight is forced to succumb to his wife's wishes. Her cleverness allows her to do as she pleases for the rest of her life, and her husband lives in shame.

== Gender Morals in Bérangier ==
The husband's initial antagonistic behavior cues the gender moral of the story: constantly demeaning a clever wife can be dangerous. To find out her husband, the wife disguises herself as a knight who she calls “Berangier au lonc cul” [Bernagier of the long arse]. She follows her husband into the forest, and, upon seeing his foolish actions, “the roles are reversed”. Whereas the woman previously had “[caught] the brunt of [her husband’s] bragging and insults,” seeing the “absolute farce” of his claims in the forest inspires her to become a “hard, driving force that will not only teach him a lesson but also will annihilate him in position as leader in the household”. Upon the encounter with his wife, disguised as a valiant knight, the husband reveals his cowardice and begs for mercy. His wife gives him an ultimatum: “jostez” [you shall joust] and surely die or “vos me venroiz el cul baisier” [you shall come kiss my ass]. Without realizing the gravity of his decision, he yields the power in his marriage to his wife, reversing his position of power when he refuses to fight the knight. In addition, he displays ignorance when he does not recognize her genitals; he merely thought the knight had a “lonc cul” [long arse]. In an exploitation of his ignorant failure to acknowledge her female genitals, the wife and the audience share pleasure in the fact she has duped her husband and the fact he will never know. The story “draw[s] a conventional lesson about proper gender roles in marriage,” which suggests a husband's demeaning of a wife is not “proper.” Thus, the reversal of the gender roles in this story creates the gender moral.

== Editions and translations ==
- Bérengier, fabliau // Le livre Mignard, ou La fleur des fabliaux. Ed. Charles Malo. Paris, 1826. pp. 82—93.
- Guèrin, 'Bèrenger of the Long Arse ', trans. by Larry D. Benson and Theodore M. Andersson in their The Literary Context of Chaucer's Fabliaux (Indianapolis and New York, 1971), pp. 11—25.

== Literature ==
- Gaunt, Simon. Gender and Genre in medieval French Literature. New York: Press Syndicate of the University of Cambridge, 1995.
- Crocker, Holly. Comic Provocations. New York: Palgrave Macmillan, 2006. Print.
- Eichmann, Raymond. Cuckolds, Clerics, & Countrymen: Medieval French Fabliaux. Fayetteville: The University of Arkansas Press, 1982. Print.
- Hellman, Robert; O'Gorman, Richard (1965). "Beranger Longbottom". Fabliaux; Ribald Tales from the Old French. New York: Thomas Y. Crowell Co. pp. 59–66.
