= Snegurochka =

Character in Russian fairy tales

Snegurochka Снегурочка
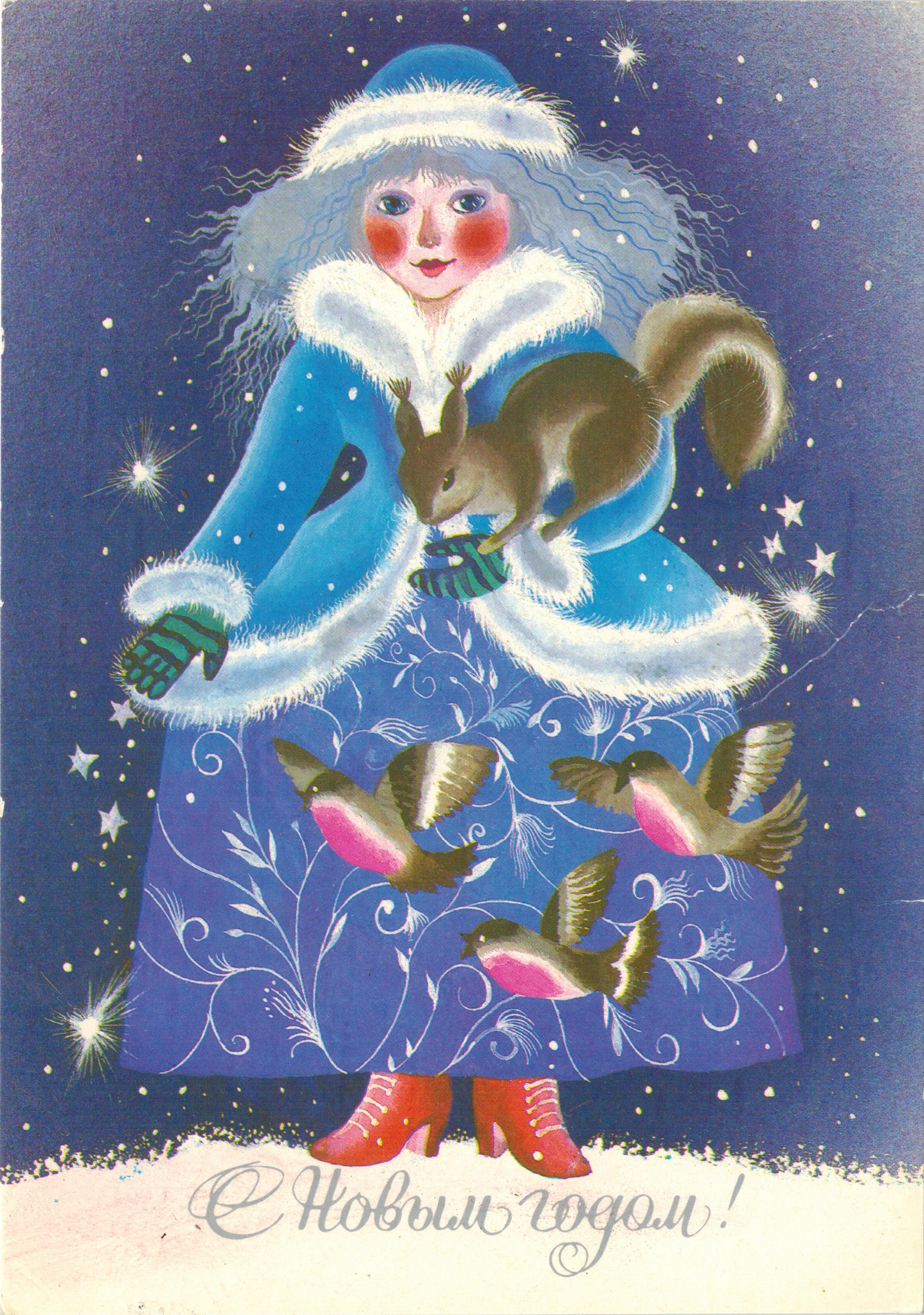
- Snegurochka on a Soviet postcard, 1990

Creature information
- Other name(s): Snow Maiden, Snegurka, Dzyunanushik, Snyahurka, Snihuronka, Karhiliw, Kharchaana, Qar Qızı, Ayaz kyz
- Similar entities: Zwarte Piet, Knecht Ruprecht, Krampus
- Family: Ded Moroz (Grandfather)

Origin
- Known for: being the companion of Ded Moroz
- Country: Russia (before: Soviet Union, Russian Empire)
- Region: Northwest Russia, Siberia, Central Russia, Eastern Europe, Caucasus, Central Asia, North Asia, Volga Region, Ural
- Habitat: Northwest Russia

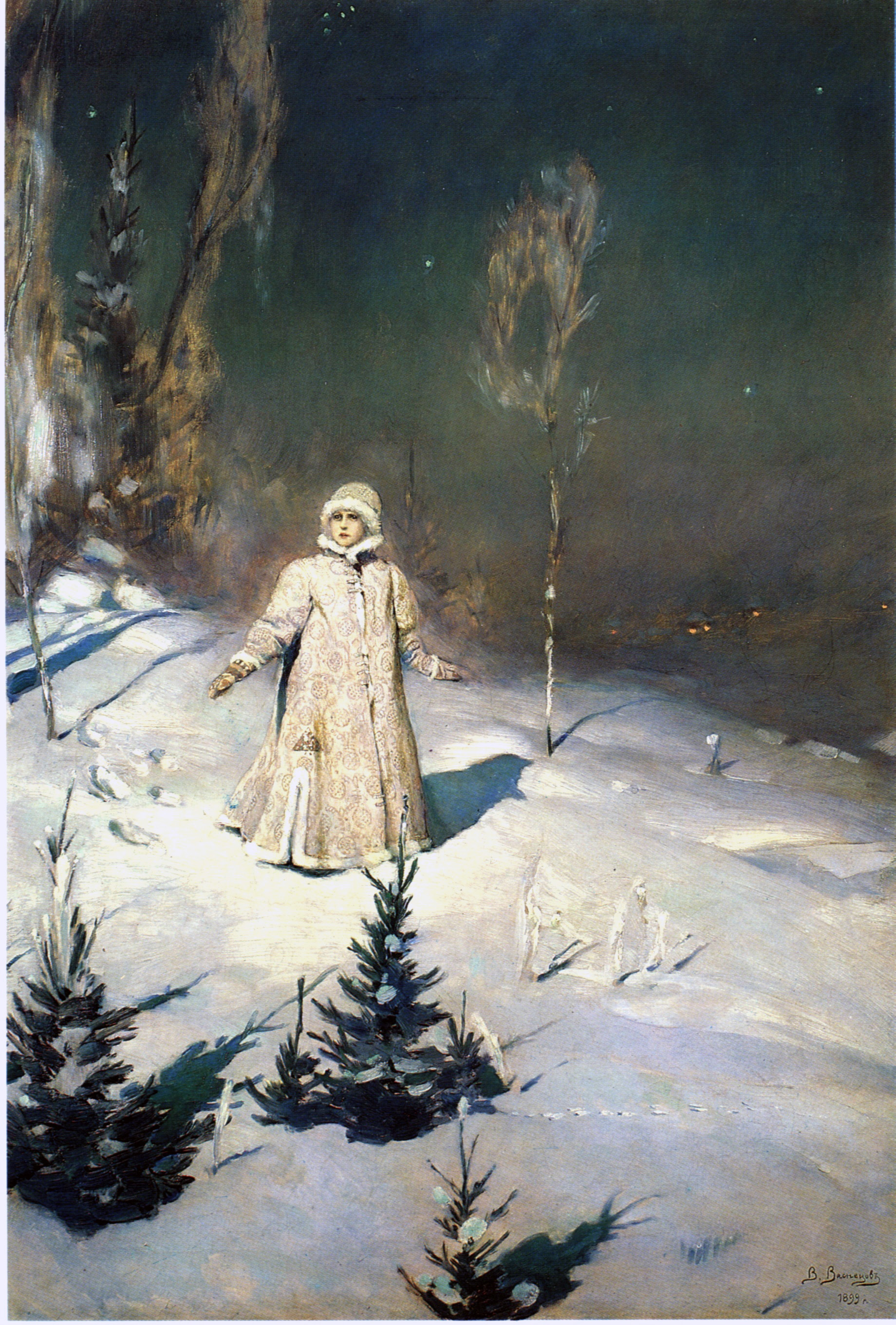
Snow Maiden (1899) by Victor Vasnetsov

Snegurochka (diminutive) or Snegurka (Russian: Снегу́рочка (diminutive), Снегу́рка, Russian pronunciation: [sʲnʲɪˈɡurət͡ɕkə, sʲnʲɪˈɡurkə]), or Snow Maiden, is a Novy God character originating from Russian fairy tales.

She has no apparent roots in traditional Slavic mythology and customs, having made her first appearance in Russian folklore in the 19th century.

Since the mid-20th century under the Soviet period, Snegurochka is known for being depicted as the granddaughter and companion of Ded Moroz during the New Year.

== Classification ==
Tales of the Snegurochka type are Aarne–Thompson type 703* The Snow Maiden. The Snegurochka story compares to tales of type 1362, The Snow-child, where the child's appearance is attributed to the mother swallowing a snowflake, as a deception to explain away her pregnancy.

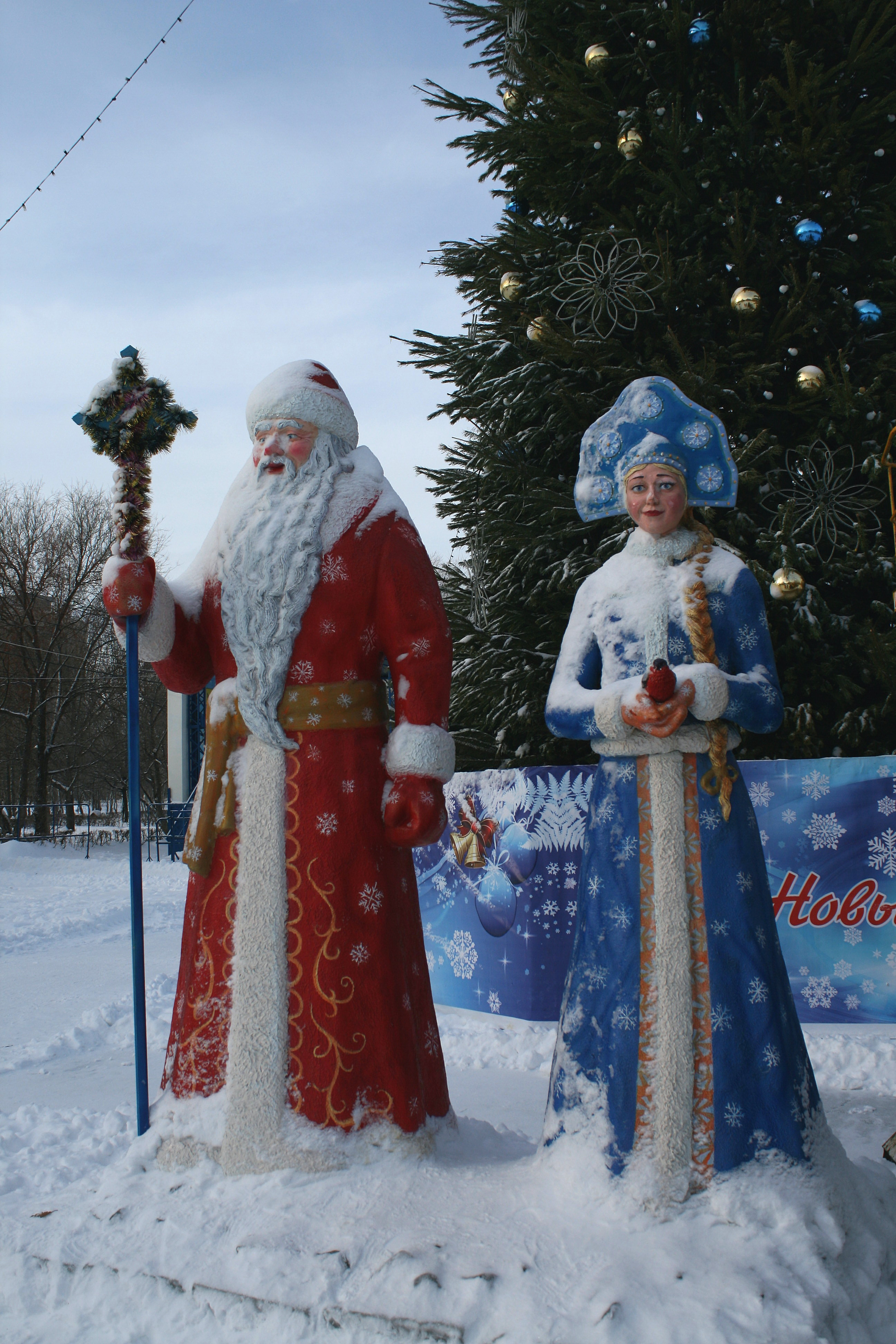
Sculptures of Ded Moroz and Snegurochka

== Folk tale versions and adaptations ==
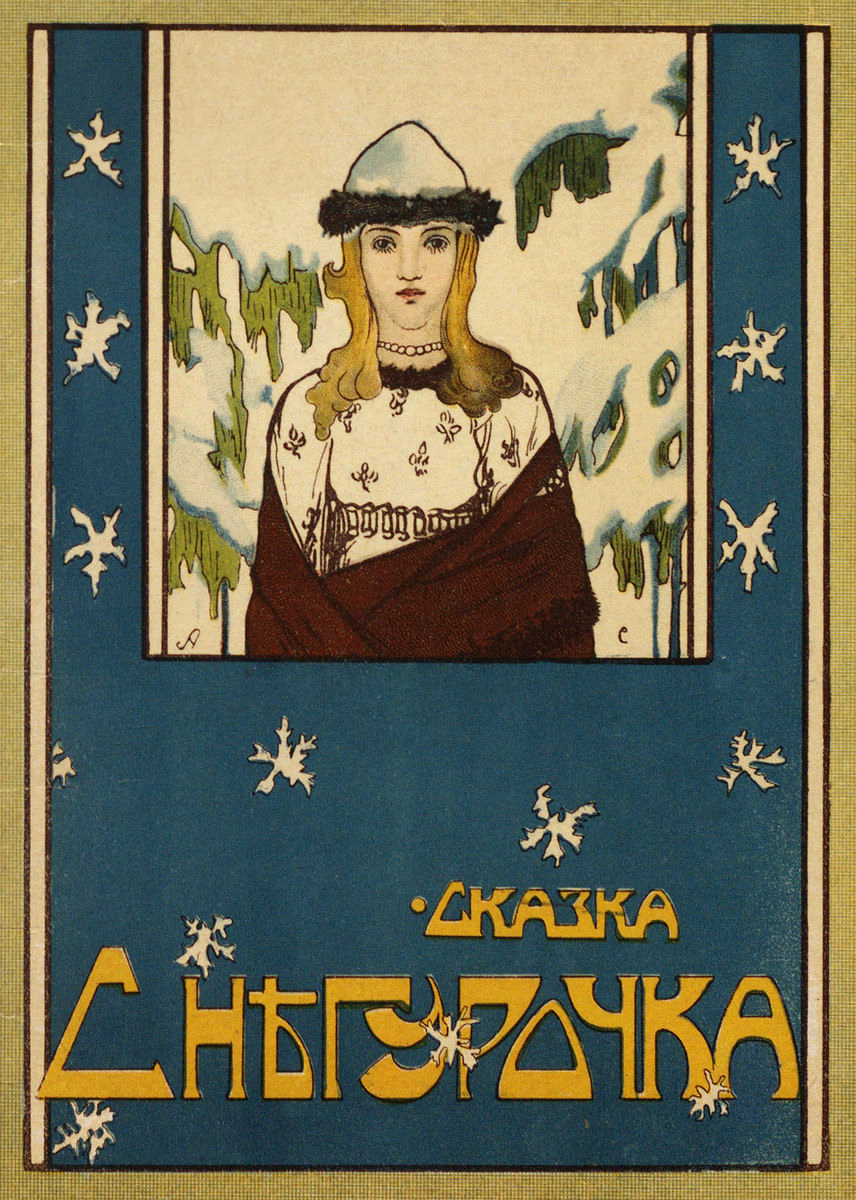
Russian folk tale book cover of Snegurochka (1916)

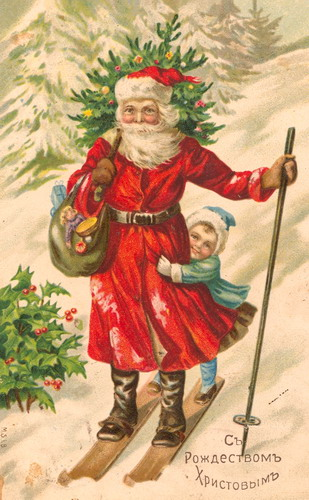
Ded Moroz with a little girl looking like Snegurochka, pre-Soviet postcard

A version of a folk tale about a girl made of snow and named Snegurka (Snezhevinochka; Снегурка (Снежевиночка)) was published in 1869 by Alexander Afanasyev in the second volume of his work The Poetic Outlook on Nature by the Slavs, where he also mentions the German analog, Schneekind ("Snow Child"). In this version, childless Russian peasants Ivan and Marya made a snow doll, which came to life. This version was later included by Louis Léger in Contes Populaires Slaves (1882). Snegurka grows up quickly. A group of girls invite her for a walk in the woods, after which they make a small fire and take turns leaping over it; in some variants, this is on St. John's Day, and a St. John's Day tradition. When Snegurka's turn comes, she starts to jump, but only gets halfway before evaporating into a small cloud. Andrew Lang included this version as "Snowflake" in The Pink Fairy Book (1897).

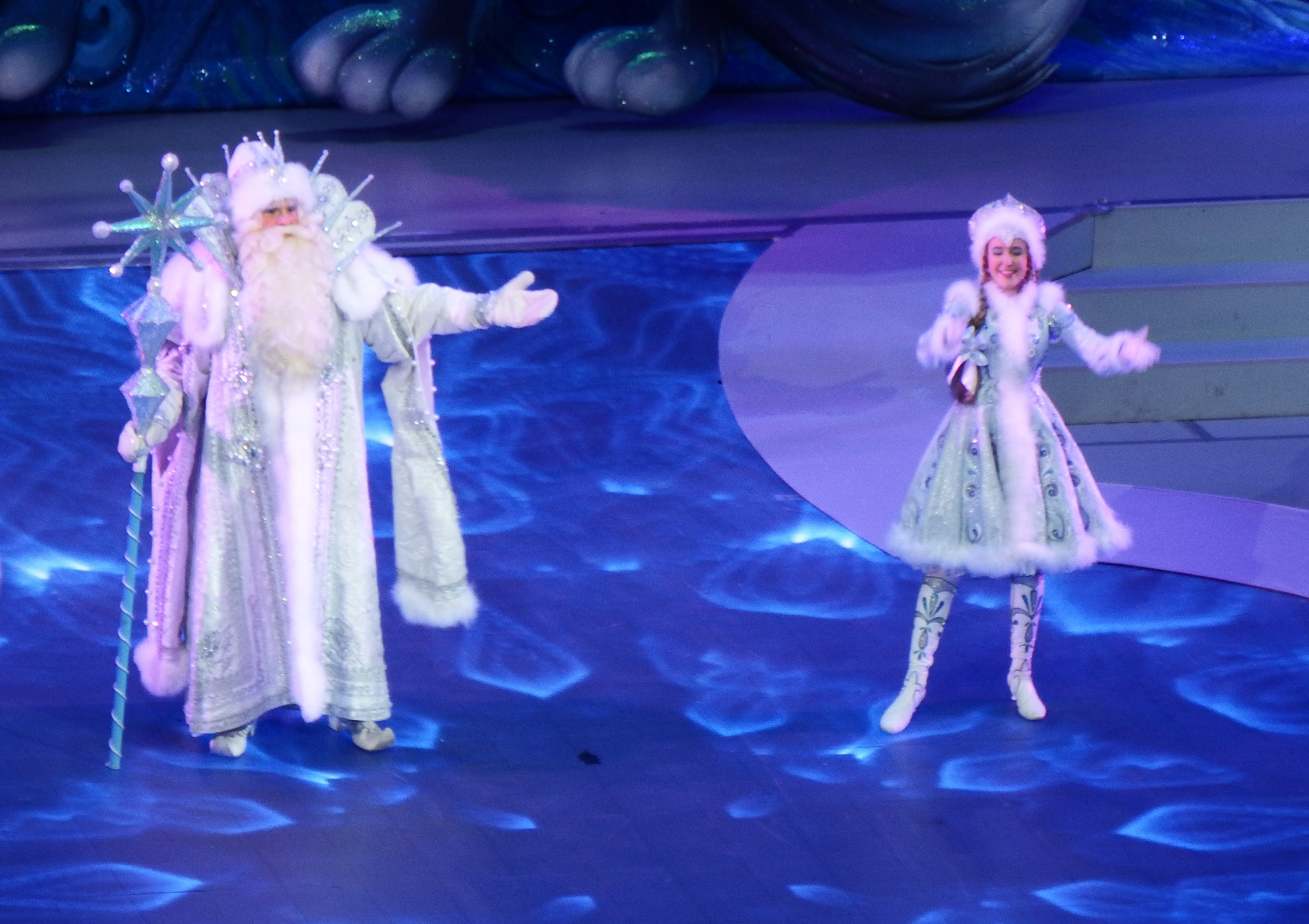
Snegurochka alongside Ded Moroz, at the 2017 New Year's celebration in the Kremlin

In another story, she is the daughter of Spring the Beauty (Весна-Красна) and Ded Moroz, and yearns for the companionship of mortal humans. She grows to like a shepherd named Lel, but her heart is unable to know love. Her mother takes pity and gives her this ability, but as soon as she falls in love, her heart warms and she melts. This version of the story was made into a play The Snow Maiden by Aleksandr Ostrovsky, with incidental music by Tchaikovsky in 1873.

In 1878, the composer Ludwig Minkus and the Balletmaster Marius Petipa staged a ballet adaptation of Snegurochka titled The Daughter of the Snows for the Tsar's Imperial Ballet. The tale was also adapted into an opera by Nikolai Rimsky-Korsakov titled The Snow Maiden: A Spring Fairy Tale (1880–1881).

The story of Snegurochka was adapted into two Soviet films: an animated film with some of Rimsky-Korsakov's music, called The Snow Maiden (1952), and the live-action film The Snow Maiden (1968). Ruth Sanderson retold the story in the picture book The Snow Princess, in which falling in love does not immediately kill the princess, but turns her into a mortal human, who will die.

In February 2012, the Slovenian poet Svetlana Makarovič published a ballad fairy tale, titled Sneguročka ("Snegurochka"), which was inspired by the Russian fairy tale character. Makarovič has had great passion for Russian tradition since childhood.

Artist and author Jonathon Keats's short story "Ardour" is a modern adaptation of this fairy tale, featured in Kate Bernheimer's 2010 anthology of contemporary tales based on classic archetypes, My Mother She Killed Me, My Father He Ate Me.

== Granddaughter of Ded Moroz ==
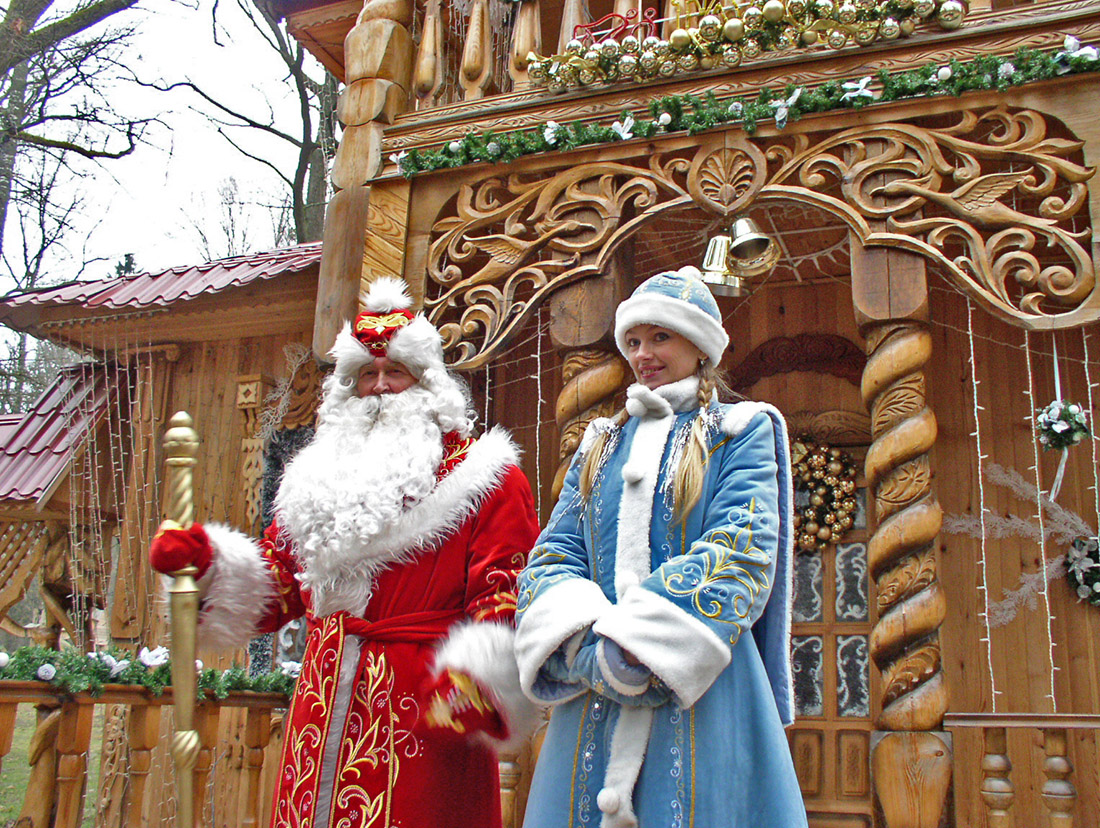
Snegurochka and Ded Moroz in Belovezhskaya Pushcha, Belarus

In the late Russian Empire Snegurochka was part of Christmas celebrations, in the form of figurines to decorate the fir tree and as a character in children's pieces. In the early Soviet Union, the holiday of Christmas was banned, together with other Christian traditions, until it was reinstated as a holiday of newly-independent Russia in 1991. However, in 1935 the celebration of the New Year was allowed, which included, in part, the fir tree and Ded Moroz. At this time Snegurochka acquired a role of the granddaughter of Ded Moroz and his helper. In this role, she wears long silver-blue robes and a furry cap or a snowflake-like kokoshnik. During the usual scripts of New Year celebrations for children, Snegurochka's appearance is preceded by the audience screaming "Sne-gu-roch-ka" while waiting for her.

== Modern Russia ==
Nowadays, Snegurochka is a strongly capitalized figure in Russia, being an important part of the New Year's celebrations, culture and almost always used as the companion of the Ded Moroz. In 2020, a man from Russia tried to sue Coca Cola for bringing Santa Claus into their Russian ad instead of Ded Moroz and Snegurochka.

== See also ==
- Christmas in Russia
