= Wilhelm Levick =

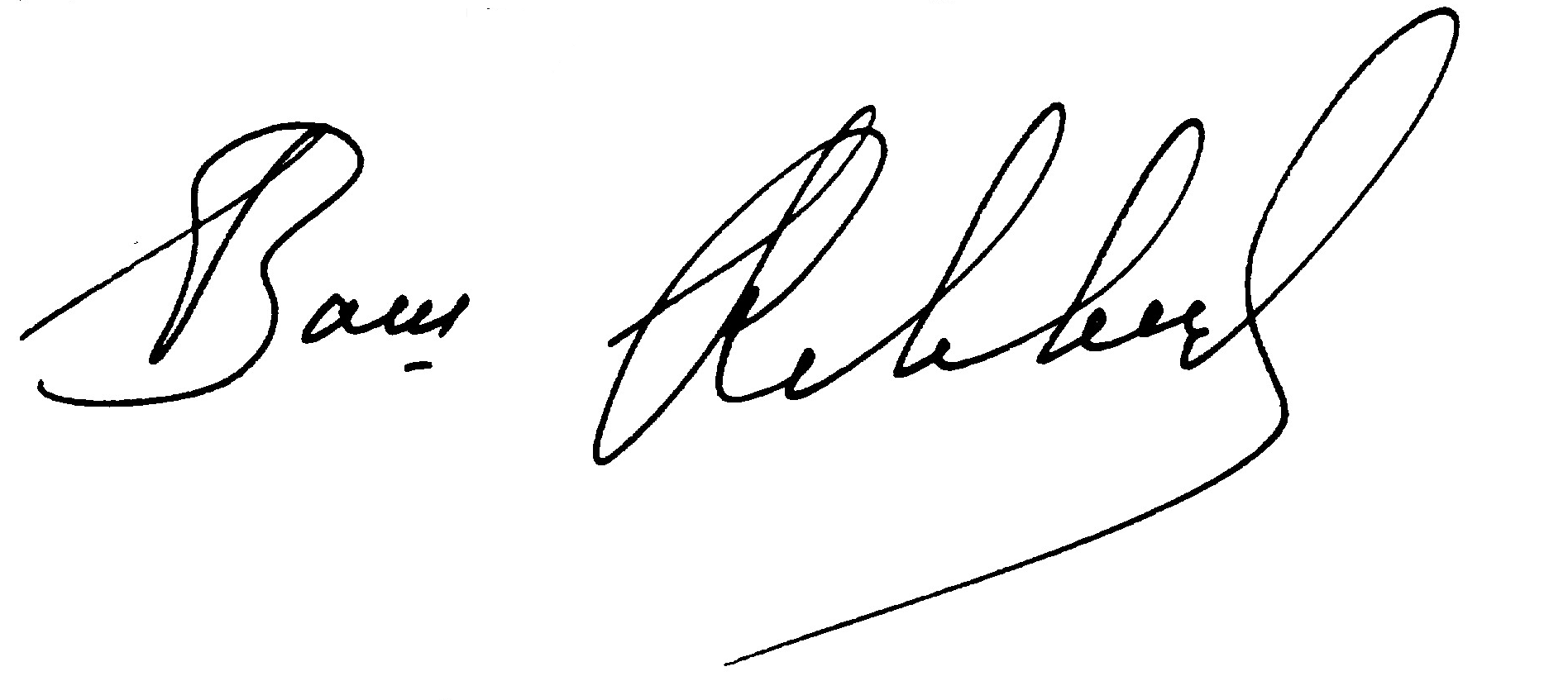
Signature

Wilhelm Veniaminovich Levick (Russian: Вильге́льм Вениами́нович Ле́вик; December 31, 1906 (13 January 1907) in Kiev – September 16, 1982 in Moscow) was a Russian poet, translator, literary critic and artist. He translated Shakespeare, Byron, Baudelaire, Goethe, Schiller, Heine, La Fontaine, Mickiewicz, Ronsard, Du Bellay, Camões, Petrarch, Gautier, Lenau, Aragon and others. Many famous poets, translators and writers have noted that Levik translations are characterized by high culture, poetry and precision in the transmission of the original.

He wrote a number of theoretical works, which are devoted to how the problems of literary translation and the creativity of major European poets.
