= Mikhail Oktan =

Russian Axis collaborator

- Михаил Октан
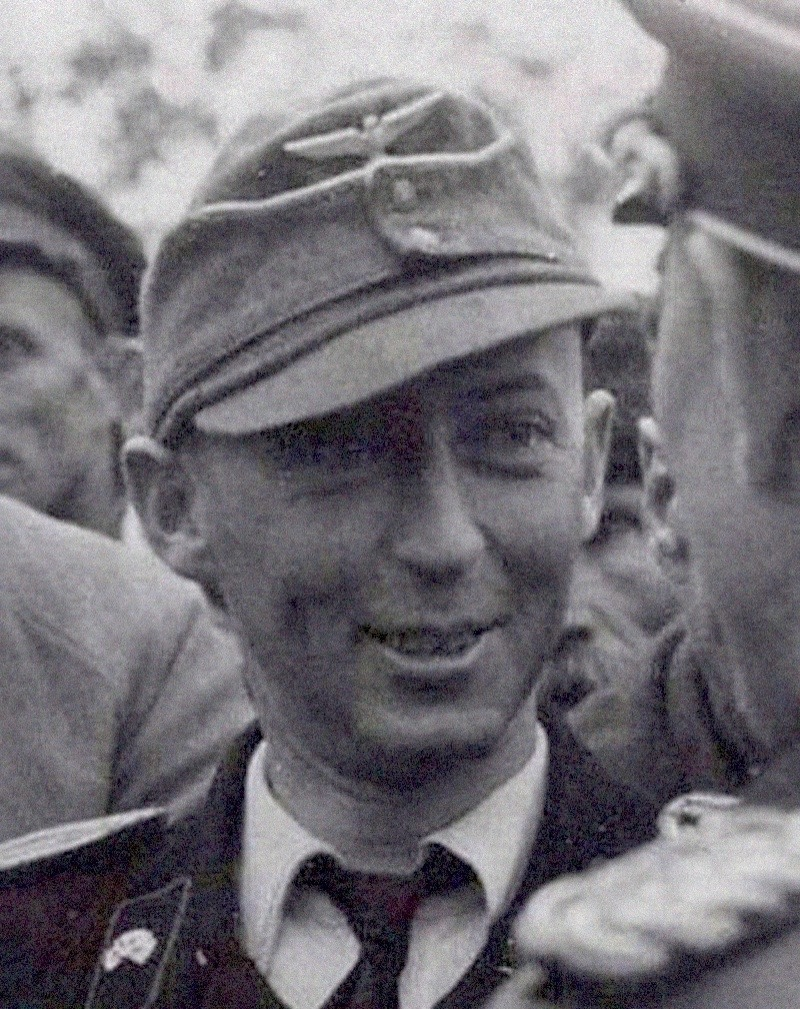
- Oktan during the war

Mayor of Oryol (de facto, German-installed)
- In office January 1942 – 1943

Personal details
- Born: Mikhail Aleksandrovich Ilinich (Note: Alternatively Ilyin (Russian: Ильин.)); February 4, 1912 Gosudarev Bairak, Bakhmut uezd, Yekaterinoslav Governorate, Russian Empire (now Ukraine)
- Died: After 1945 (aged 33)

Military service
- Allegiance: Soviet Union; Nazi Germany
- Rank: Red Army Captain; ROA Lieutenat
- Unit: Red Army; Russian Liberation Army
- Battles/wars: World War II; Warsaw Uprising

Mikhail Aleksandrovich Ilinich (Russian: Михаил Александрович Ильинич; Ukrainian: Михайль Олександрович Іллініч; February 4, 1912, Gosudarev Bairak, Bakhmut uezd, Yekaterinoslav Governorate, Russian Empire (now Ukraine) – after 1945), better known by the pseudonym of Mikhail Oktan (Russian: Михаил Октан; Ukrainian: Михайло Октан) was a Russian Nazi collaborator during World War II who served as de facto mayor of the city of Oryol under Nazi occupation, as well as an important Russian collaborationist in Bobruisk. He was active in Russia, Belarus, and Poland.

== Early life ==
Little is known about Oktan's early life although it's speculated he had Croatian origins or ancestry based on his surname Ilinich. It was alleged that he was born in the city of Odessa. In 2025, genealogists discovered his birth document. He was born on January 22 (February 4) as a son of a mining engineer Aleksandr Ilinich in Gosudarev Bairak (currently Horlivka in Ukraine).

He described himself to German officers as an engineer, and was, according to historian Alexander Dallin, said by some peers to have studied economics. It was claimed by a newspaperman close to Oktan that he had been a member of the Communist Party of the Soviet Union prior to World War II, possibly as a propagandist or local functionary. This claim was also repeated in intelligence from Soviet partisans, which stated Oktan had been head of the Oryol Oblast education department prior to the outbreak of the war.

According to a 1943 article in The New York Times, Oktan's ethnicity was unclear, and his grasp of the Russian language was "doubtful." This claim is in dispute with Dallin's paper, which describes Oktan as possessing significant oratory and journalistic skill.

== Rule over Oryol ==
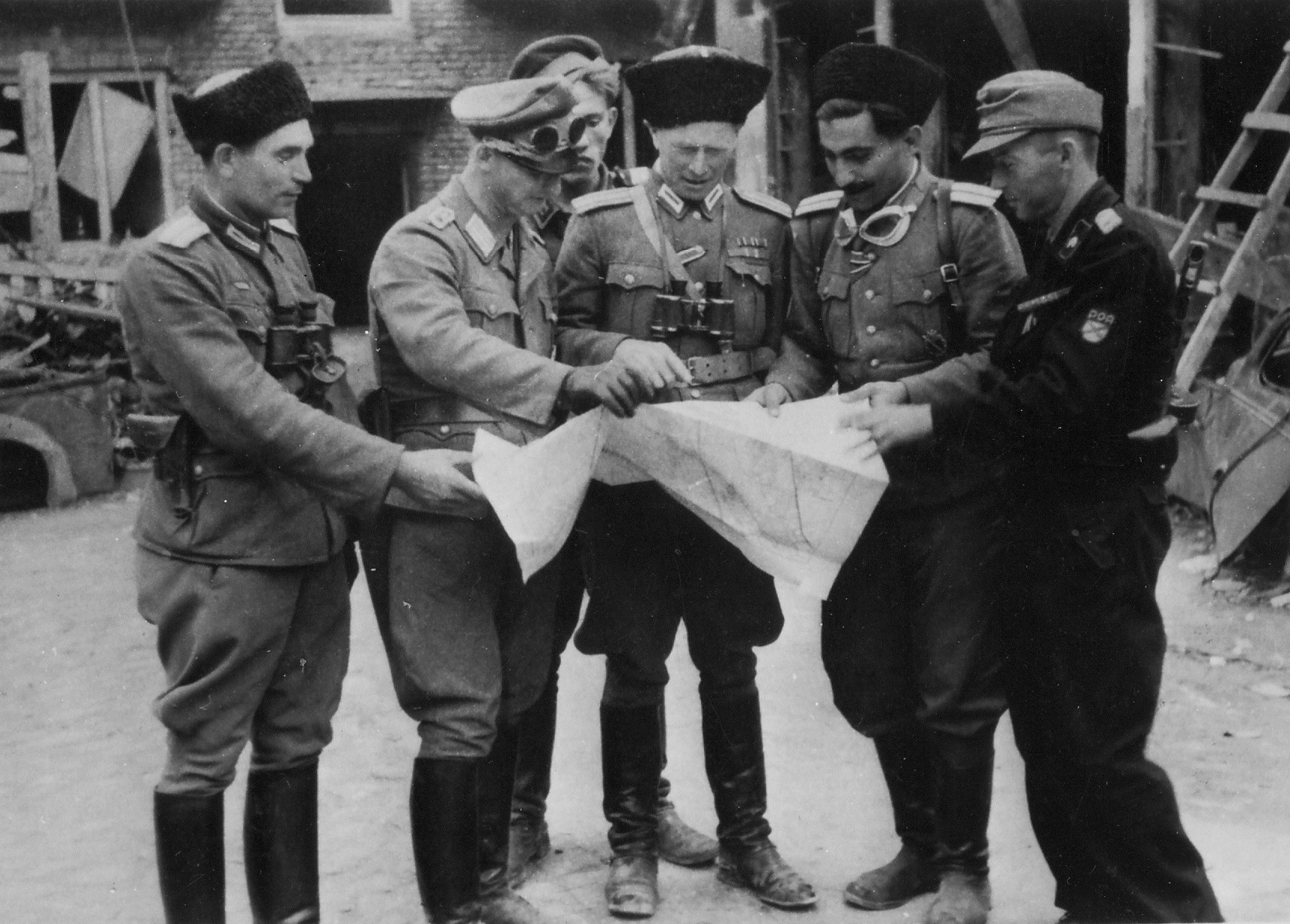
Oktan (furthest right) in 1944, during the Warsaw Uprising

Following Operation Barbarossa, Oktan was a captain in the Red Army. Following the capture of Oryol by German forces on 7 October 1941, Oktan found himself behind enemy lines. In January 1942, he offered assistance to the Germans, apparently detailing the need for effective anti-Soviet propaganda among Russians (particularly peasants, workers, and soldiers), the development of anti-Soviet resistance within the Soviet Union, and the need for Soviet citizens to lead the production of propaganda. According to Dallin, Oktan's knowledge of German assisted in his ability to bring the Germans to support his efforts.

While the de jure mayor of Oryol was a former officer of the Russian Empire surnamed Stavrov, he lacked governmental experience or drive, leading to Oktan becoming the city's de facto dictator. By February 1942, he had begun writing articles in Rech (Russian: Речь, lit. 'Speech'), a newspaper which served as his primary mouthpiece. According to the United States Holocaust Memorial Museum, Rech was among the most virulently antisemitic publications published within the German-occupied Soviet Union, and Oktan regularly expressed antisemitic views, in addition to anti-Armenian and anti-Georgian sentiment, primarily targeting Anastas Mikoyan, Joseph Stalin, and Sergo Ordzhonikidze. Other writers at Rech included Vladimir Samarin (Oktan's second-in-command) and Eugene Sadowski (who translated German war reports). Among Oktan's publications include War and zhidy, an antisemitic tract which reads in part as follows:

...This war will result not in the decline of humanity, but in its flourishing after extinction of all influence of Jewish race. Human history will also be the judge of the Jewish race which brought the people so much unhappiness and suffering throughout many hundreds of years...Jews have yet to pay the bill submitted to them by Russian people. This bill is presented to them now on the bayonets of the Russian liberation army. It will be repaid!

Oktan further tied himself ideologically to Nazism, while simultaneously claiming that Germany did not wish to ideologically dominate Russia, saying instead that the restoration of a "normal life", including pre-Communist policies on land and religion. He maintained consistent support from the Germans, and banned War and Peace from Oryol as a show of his pro-German position, and additionally said, "These days we don't need Pushkin and Lermontov. I recommend that every Russian have a copy of Dostoevsky's Possessed on his desk." In spring 1943, field marshal Günther von Kluge recommended Oktan as the sixth member of a proposed committee bringing together Russian collaborators, in addition to five local collaborationist leaders. The committee was ultimately never established, owing to Hitler's opposition to the employment of former Soviet citizens on the committee.

== In Belarus ==
In summer of 1943, Oryol was recaptured by Soviet troops. Oktan retreated with German troops, first to Bryansk and later to Babruysk, in eastern Belarus. In Babruysk, Oktan re-established himself as a local leader, participating in local culture and continuing to pursue women. At the same time, he began to expand his activities from propaganda into the political sphere. This resulted in the formation of the "Union for the Struggle Against Bolshevism" on 7 March 1944 at a rally of 2,000 individuals. The formation was preceded by elaborate preparation of material, including insignia, flags, radio speeches, and the support of the 9th Army in the Union's formation. Dallin posited that Oktan was permitted by the Germans to do as he wished for the establishment of his Union, as evidenced by his rewarding local businesses and the presence of German soldiers at the 7 March rally.

Following the establishment of the Union, additional recruitment centres were established in the cities of Barysaw, Rahachow, and Krychaw. Oktan was additionally given permission in mid-April 1944 to recruit in Western Belorussia, and German reports noted that the Union deliberately eschewed a clear political position, a move Germany supported. According to official figures (suggested by Dallin to be "vastly inflated"), membership reached 75,000 by June 1944, with the issue of restoring private ownership of land as the primary position of the Union. In spite of this, however, the Union was inactive, with all of Belarus being recaptured by Soviet forces in June 1944. It primarily was used in an effort to relieve German supply issues, including the delivery of foodstuff, the usage of members to dig trenches or deliver supplies, and the supply of German soldiers via the peasantry.

Simultaneously with the work of the Union, Oktan directed the "Russian Youth Movement," an organisation which participated actively in the Heuaktion, or kidnapping of children aged 10 to 14. Initially taking responsibility for the welfare of the children, any semblance of order dissolved under Oktan's leadership, with some camps of children being evacuated with retreating German soldiers and many being left stranded without any form of identification.

Oktan continued to actively promote himself as a collaborationist leader to the war's end, continuing his lavish lifestyle in spite of the war's worsening state, and additionally unsuccessfully sought an alliance with Belarusian collaborators (in part due to German urging). However, following the recapture of Babruysk by Soviet forces, Oktan abandoned all that he had for Germany.

== Fate ==
Little is known about Oktan's fate following the recapture of Babruysk, save for that he was a participant in the suppression of the Warsaw Uprising. He signed his last publication in Rech on November 5, 1944. All further information about him is unconfirmed; he never appeared at any meetings of the Committee for the Liberation of the Peoples of Russia and was not mentioned in German documents since late 1944.

In the winter of 1944-1945, Oktan was stated by informants to have been spotted in Berlin on multiple occasions. It has additionally been stated that Oktan was spotted in Frankfurt in 1947, though Dallin states that nothing is known of his fate beyond that. Soviet newspaper Gomelskaya Pravda alleged in July 1944 that Oktan, along with Barysaw's mayor, Stanislaŭ Stankievič (who was not captured, but escaped and died in exile in 1980), was captured by Soviet forces.

Author John Loftus claimed in his book America's Nazi Secret that Oktan was a naturalised United States citizen after the founding of the Office of Special Investigations in 1979, and that the OSI was pursuing his denaturalisation. Loftus additionally claimed that Oktan was working for Mykola Lebed at the time of OSI's investigation. However, these claims remain unconfirmed.

== Ideology and personality ==
According to Dallin, Oktan was described as adventurous by other collaborators, and alternatively as idealist and opportunist, as well as demagogic. One collaborator said that he "skillfully combined the qualities of a German officer, an Odesan tradesman, and a clever lickspittle." He imitated the gestures and appearance of Hitler, and was known to have a love for medals, alcohol, and women. He was described by the wartime police chief of Mogilev as a "habitual drunkard", and it was recounted by a young officer that when he visited the offices of Rech, all seven of the newspaper's employees (Oktan included) were inebriated.

Oktan was known to have two assistants, an adjutant and a valet. The latter also acted as a treasurer for Oktan, paying Oktan's expenses for him. In Babruysk, Oktan was known to award local artistic figures and actresses, and additionally assisted in the establishment of local orphanages, chess clubs, and businesses. He was known to impress audiences with carefully-choreographed displays at dinners, with one account describing the course of events as such:

Oktan receives his guests in a tastefully-furnished living room. His officers stand at attention along the walls. Oktan makes the acquaintance of his guests, introduces his aides, and invites all to the table. The guests are offered cigarettes. The six officers, by ‘etiquette’, immediately reach for their lighters but do not approach the guests. Oktan himself gets some matches from his pocket and offers his guests a light—a little detail which does not fail to impress the guests. Vodka and hors d’oeuvres appear on the table. Oktan does not discuss politics, preferring to talk literature with the Bobruisk ‘intelligentsia’. An invited guitarist meanwhile strums away. When the guests finally leave, they have won the impression that here is a man more substantial than the German commandant at their plant. Oktan is to be feared, respected, and listened to.

He was also regarded as relatively independent among the collaborators, often debating with German officers and charting a course independently from that of other collaborators. At the same time, however, Oktan showed more loyalty to Germany than any other Russian collaborator or group.

=== Relations with other collaborators ===
Oktan had fraught relations with other collaborators, particularly Bronislav Kaminski and the National Alliance of Russian Solidarists (NTS). Both Kaminski and NTS leader Viktor Baidalakov expressed a desire to hang Oktan, and Oktan likewise barred both from influencing his fiefdom, banning Kaminski from conducting political activities and speaking against "outside influence." Samarin, Oktan's second-in-command, was known to be a member of the NTS.

Oktan also had generally negative, though more ambivalent, views towards Andrey Vlasov. He repeatedly stated that 'Vlasovite ideals' were banned in areas under his control, and expressed the view that he could have exceeded Vlasov in terms of building a collaborationist military force. Nonetheless, following the establishment of the Russian Liberation Army (ROA), Oktan became a lieutenant, though he never actively participated in the ROA. He claimed that he was willing to "cede" the 70,000 men of the Union to the ROA in return for a significant position within the army, but was turned down.
