= The Snow-child =

European folktale

The Snow-child is a widespread European folktale, found in many medieval tellings.

It is Aarne–Thompson type 1362.

== Synopsis ==
A merchant returns home after an absence of two years to find his wife with a newborn son. She explains one snowy day she swallowed a snowflake while thinking about her husband which caused her to conceive. Pretending to believe, he raises the boy with her until he takes the boy on a trip and sells him into slavery. On his return, he explains to his wife that the boy melted in the heat.

== Variants ==
The tale first appears in the 11th-century Cambridge Songs. It also appears in Medieval fabliau, and was used in school exercises of rhetoric. A Medieval play about the Virgin Mary has characters disbelieving her story of her pregnancy citing the tale.

It contrasts to Aarne-Thompson type 703*, Snow Maiden, where a child really has a magical snow-related origin.
