= Christmas in Russia =

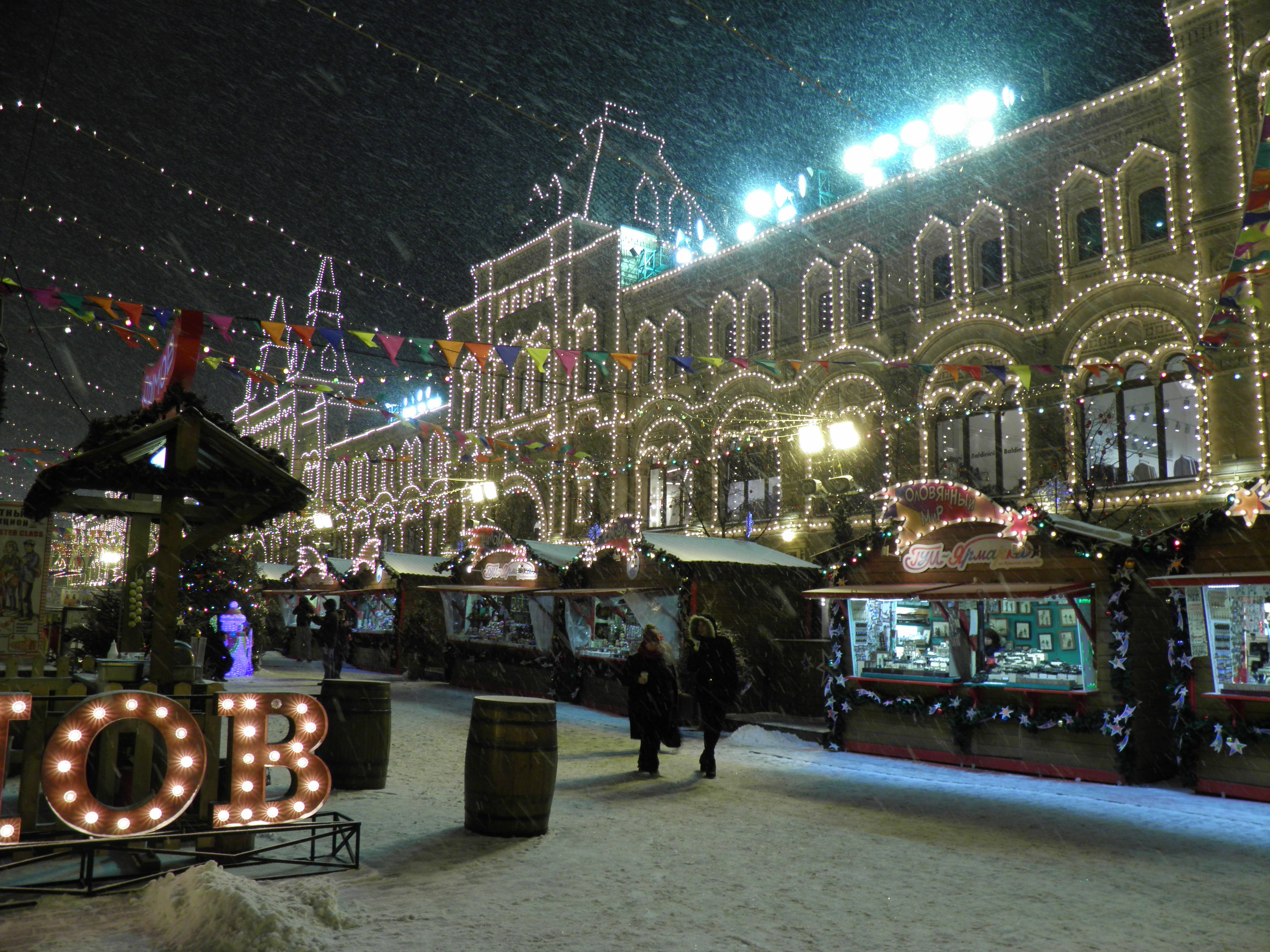
- The GUM-Fair on the Red Square
- Official name: Рождество Христово (Rozhdestvo Khristovo)
- Observed by: Christians, many non-Christians
- Significance: Commemoration of the Nativity of Jesus
- Celebrations: Christmas tree decorations, gift-giving, family and other social gatherings, feasting, etc.
- Observances: Church services
- Date: 25 December: Western Christianity; January 7 [O.S. December 25]: Eastern Christianity
- Frequency: annual
- Related to: Nativity Fast

Christmas in Russia (Russian: Рождество Христово, Rozhdestvo Khristovo), called Е́же по пло́ти Рождество Господа Бога и Спа́са нашего Иисуса Христа (Yezhe po ploti Rozhdestvo Gospoda Boga i Spasa nashego Yisusa Khrista) in the Russian Orthodox Church, is a holiday commemorating the birth of Jesus Christ. It is celebrated on 25 December on the Julian calendar, which corresponds to 7 January on the Gregorian calendar (the calendar that is mostly used in Western society) until 2100, when it will move to January 8 in 2101. It is considered a high holiday by the church, one of the 12 Great Feasts, and one of only four of which are preceded by a period of fasting. Traditional Russian Christmas festivities start on Christmas Eve, which is celebrated on 6 January [O.S. 24 December].

Christmas was largely erased from the Russian calendar for much of the 20th century due to the Soviet Union's anti-religious policies, but many of its traditions survived, having been transplanted to New Year's Day. Although Christmas was re-established as a holiday in the 1990s after the collapse of the Soviet Union, it is still eclipsed by New Year's Day, which remains the most important Russian holiday.

== History ==
In Russia, the Christmas holiday became the official celebration with the baptism of Rus' ordered by Prince Vladimir in the late 10th century. However, given the early Christian community of Kievan Rus', the celebration may have a longer history.

In the 19th century, a lavishly decorated Christmas tree became central to the holiday, a tradition originally imported by Nicholas I's wife, Alexandra Feodorovna, from her native Prussia. The tradition of giving gifts to children on Christmas took root around the same time. The gifts given to children usually are candy, books, toys, and clothing. Christmas gifts were traditionally brought by Ded Moroz (Russian: Дед Моро́з, lit. 'Grandfather Frost'), the Russian counterpart of Saint Nicholas or Father Christmas, albeit a little taller and less stout. Rooted in Slavic folklore, Ded Moroz is accompanied by his beautiful granddaughter, Snegurochka (Russian: Снегу́рочка, lit. 'The Snow Maiden'), who rides with him on a sleigh pulled by a trio of horses.

During the early Soviet period, all religious celebrations were discouraged under the official state policy of atheism. The Bolsheviks argued that Christmas was a pagan sun-worshipping ritual with no basis in scientific fact and denounced the Christmas tree as a bourgeois German import. In 1929, all religious holidays, including Christmas, were abolished by a decree of the Stalinist regime. However, in a surprising turn of state politics in 1935, many Russian Christmas traditions were revived as part of a secular New Year's celebration after it was allowed again. The Christmas tree was repurposed as a "New Year's fir tree" (Russian: Нового́дняя ёлка, romanized: Novogodnyaya yolka) to be admired by all children throughout the Soviet Union, including those in republics that had not historically celebrated Christmas due to their different religious traditions, such as the Central Asian ones. Other Russian Christmas attributes and traditions, such as gift-giving, Ded Moroz's visits and Christmas decorations, lost their religious significance and became associated with New Year's celebrations, which were secular in nature.

In 1991, after the dissolution of the Soviet Union, Christmas was reinstated alongside other religious holidays.

== Religious services ==
On Christmas Eve (6 January), there are several long church services, including the Royal Hours and Vespers combined with the Divine Liturgy - serving as the end of the long Nativity Fast. The family will then return home for the traditional Christmas Eve dinner (Holy Supper), which consists of 12 dishes, one to honour each of the Twelve Apostles - but has no meat as it is a mandatory paramony or fasting day. Devout families will then return to church for the All Night Vigil followed by Midnight Divine Liturgy, which for those who cannot attend, is broadcast on television nationally from Cathedral of Christ the Saviour - with the Patriach of Moscow and All Russia presiding - and regionally from major cathedrals. Then again, on Christmas Morning, they return to attend the Morning Divine Liturgy of the Nativity. Since 1992, Christmas has become a national holiday in Russia as part of the ten-day holidays at the start of the new year.

== Traditional festive cuisine ==
Principal dishes on the Christmas table in old Russia included roasted pig, stuffed pig's head, roasted meat chunks, jelly (kholodets), and aspic. Christmas dinner also included many other meats: goose with apples, sour cream hare, venison, lamb, whole fish, etc. The abundance of fried and baked meats, whole baked chicken, and fish on the festive table was associated with features of the Russian oven, which allowed successful preparation of large portions.

Finely sliced meat and pork was cooked in pots with semi-traditional porridge. Pies were indispensable dishes for Christmas, as well as other holidays, and included both closed and open style pirogi (pirozhki, vatrushkas, coulibiacs, kurnik, saechki, shangi), kalachi, cooked casseroles, and blini. Fillings of every flavor were included (herbal, vegetable, fruit, mushrooms, meat, fish, cheese, mixed).

Sweet dishes served on the Russian Christmas table included berries, fruit, candy, cakes, angel wings, biscuits, honey. Beverages included drinking broths (kompot and sweet soups, sbiten), kissel, and, from the beginning of the 18th century, Chinese tea.

== Complaints over government recognition ==
In 1999, the atheist MV Agbunov requested that the Constitutional Court of the Russian Federation test the constitutionality of decrees on the recognition of 7 January as a federal holiday. This request was denied by the court, based on the argument that "the specified statutory provisions apply to the law on public holidays days ..., and do not contain provisions indicating the violation of constitutional rights and freedoms referred to by the applicant. (Articles 14, 19, 28 and 29 (part 2) of the Constitution of Russia)".

In 2008, a Russian neo-pagan group filed a similar complaint. The group argued that recognition of the Orthodox Christmas as an official holiday is contrary to the Constitution of Russia, according to which "no religion can be established as state and obligatory". After having considered the complaint, the court rejected it on the grounds that decisions about public holidays are within the competence of the Russian Parliament and are not a constitutional matter.

== See also ==
- Christmas worldwide
- Koliada
- Novy God
- Orthodox New Year
- Religion in Russia
