= Nico H.J. van den Boogaard =

Dutch medievalist scholar

Nicolaas ("Nico") Hendricus Johannes van den Boogaard (28 October 1938, Amsterdam – 25 December 1982, Heemstede) was a medievalist scholar, professor, and dean of the Faculty of Letters at the University of Amsterdam.

== Career ==
In addition to his work as a teacher and administrator, he published widely on medieval French literature. His doctoral dissertation, Rondeaux et refrains du XIIe siècle au début du XIVe: Collationnement, introduction et notes (Paris: Klincksieck, 1969), continues to be cited. This dissertation built a corpus of Old French lyric poetry that Van den Boogaard then put into a computer database. In 1970, he enlarged the database and generated statistical information about several genres of medieval French literature. He was a pioneer in the field of digital humanities, as well as a scholar of Old French philology and literature.

With Willem Noomen, he co-edited the ten-volume Nouveau recueil complet des fabliaux (NRCF) (Assen, Holland: Van Gorcum, 1983-2001), ISBN 9023219864 (volume 1) and ISBN 9023219872 (volume 1 paperback), ISBN 9789023220466 (volume 2), ISBN 9789023221746 (volume 3), ISBN 9789023223641 (volume 4), ISBN 9789023224662 (volume 5), ISBN 9789023226338 (volume 6), ISBN 9789023228240 (volume 7), ISBN 9789023229629 (volume 8), ISBN 9789023232001 (volume 9), and ISBN 9789023233299 (volume 10).

He did not live to see it published. He died unexpectedly of cardiac arrest at age 44, on Christmas Day in 1982.

Many of the medievalist articles that Van den Boogaard wrote between 1962 and 1982 were republished after his death in the anthology Autour de 1300: Etudes de philologie et de littérature médiévales (Amsterdam: Rodopi, 1985), ISBN 9062035183 / ISBN 9789062035182. A bibliography of his publications, listing two dozen articles as well as book reviews and collaborative papers, is included in the introduction to Autour de 1300, pages xxi-xxiv.

Van den Boogaard's style of academic writing was modern, modest, interdisciplinary, good-humored, and accessible to a broad audience.
