= Vladimir Samarin =

Russian Axis collaborator and educator

Vladimir Sokolov
- Born: 2 March 1913; Oryol, Russian Empire (now Oryol Oblast, Russian Federation)
- Died: 19 January 1992 (aged 78); Montreal, Quebec, Canada
- Criminal charges: Illegal procurement of American citizenship False statements to government officials

Vladimir Dmitriyevich Sokolov (Note: Russian: Владимир Дмитриевич Соколов) (2 March 1913 – 19 January 1992), also known under the pen name of Samarin, (Note: Russian: Самарин) was a Russian Nazi collaborator, journalist, writer, researcher and educator. Following his work as a propagandist for Nazi Germany as one of the writers of the Rech newspaper, he fled to the United States and became a senior lector of Russian language studies at Yale University from 1949 to 1976. In 1982, he was targeted by the United States Department of Justice for deportation, bringing him national notoriety. Following the revocation of his citizenship, he fled to an Orthodox monastery in Montreal, Canada, where he died in 1992.

== Early life ==
Vladimir Dmitriyevich Sokolov was born to the family of a nobleman and landlords in Oryol, in what was then the Russian Empire, on 2 March 1913. In 1921, as a student, he witnessed the crushing of the Tambov rebellion by the Red Army with the usage of chemical weapons, an experience which had a great effect on his personal views. Following his graduation from school, he could not enter Moscow or Leningrad State Universities due to his family's aristocratic background. He enrolled at Oryol State University (then Oryol State Pedological Institute) and graduated after four years, working in nearby Ramon.

In December 1937, Sokolov was targeted by the NKVD, and fled to the city of Samara, where he lived until he moved to Voronezh in the summer. In Voronezh, he lived with friends under an assumed name and became a literature teacher and later educational director at a local college.

== Collaboration with Nazi Germany ==
In 1941, only days after Sokolov had returned to Voronezh from a visit to Oryol, the latter city was occupied by Nazi Germany. After the 1942 Battle of Voronezh, Sokolov, along with his wife and her daughter, returned to Oryol on foot - a distance of 312 kilometres. After settling in Oryol, he joined the collaborationist Rech, written by Mikhail Oktan, as an editor. Sokolov chose "Samarin" as his pen name, after 19th-century Slavophile leader Yuri Samarin.

Sokolov, now going by the name of Samarin, climbed the ranks rapidly, and was promoted to deputy editor-in-chief by the end of 1942. His content was fiercely antisemitic, with condemnations of "kike-bolshevism", the Jewish "conquest of the world", supposed Jewish provocation of the war, Jewish "domination" of western countries, and the Protocols of the Elders of Zion. Other topics included the Russian Liberation Army and propagandisation of Ostarbeiter slave camps. According to the United States Holocaust Memorial Museum, under the leadership of Oktan and Sokolov, Rech was "likely the most anti-Semitic of all collaborative newspapers published on occupied territory [of the Soviet Union]." Among Sokolov's writings was as follows:

In the course of millennia Jews were conquering the world systematically and unflinchingly. All means, without exclusion of most gruesome, were utilized by them and their road to global dominance is covered with blood of millions of people...Significant role in corruption and zhidovisation of highest levels of English society was played by freemasonry, a powerful Jewish organization enveloping all countries with its activities. The type of influence of freemasonry in England can be judged by the fact that the king himself is a member of freemason lodge.

— V. Samarin (Sokolov), England and Judaism, Rech

Throughout 1943, as the Red Army retook Oryol, Sokolov and the rest of Rech's staff fled west, first towards Bryansk before settling in Babruysk in modern-day Belarus. He joined the organisation headed by his superior, Mikhail Oktan, called the League for the Struggle Against Bolshevism (by this point one of the last remaining collaborationist organisations). Less than a year later, following Babruysk being retaken by the Soviets, Samarin was relocated to Berlin, where he worked for two different Nazi propaganda newspapers.

== Life in the United States ==
Following the signing of the German Instrument of Surrender, Sokolov fled with his wife and daughter to Hamburg, where he became head of the German chapter of the National Alliance of Russian Solidarists, a militant anti-communist organisation of Russian émigrés. In 1952, Sokolov applied for a visa to the United States, claiming he had simply been a fugitive from the NKVD and a proof-reader for an anti-communist newspaper.

By 27 June of that year, he had arrived in New York City. In New York, he worked for Chekhov Publishing House as a copy editor. His career advanced quickly, and in 1954, he was invited by Alexander Dallin to write a monograph. Sokolov's monograph, titled Civilian Life Under German Occupation, 1942-44, minimised the role of collaborators by stating that Russians viewed the Nazis as liberators and the Soviet Union as an alien conspiracy.

During the 1950s, Sokolov worked for both Columbia University as a writer and the Federal Bureau of Investigation as an informant on potential Soviet infiltrators in American chapters of the NTS. In 1959, he was hired by Yale University as an instructor in Russian language studies. Norman J. W. Goda, an American historian on the Holocaust, has proposed that Sokolov may have been hired at Yale University due to his FBI connections, saying, "I don't know how he got his position at Yale. I posited that the FBI might have had some kind of role in that, but I really don't know. And I said that perhaps the FBI was using him as some sort of source on Yale, but I really didn't know that either. I was just sort of guessing. [Sokolov's hiring] didn't make sense."

== Trial, deportation, and death ==
In 1976, multiple Soviet and Jewish newspapers had raised alarms about Sokolov's past, including an article in the Yiddish-language Soviet magazine Sovetish Heymland. Following outcry by members of Yale faculty, he was put on paid leave for 18 months. Sokolov admitted he had written the articles, but claimed he had been forced to implement antisemitic content by censors and did not know Jews were being exterminated.

The Office of Special Investigations, founded in 1979, began its attempt to denaturalise Sokolov in January 1982. The trial opened with testimony from Holocaust historian Robert Herzstein, who stated that Sokolov had participated in "ideological and psychological warfare" on behalf of the Nazis. Further evidence, acquired from Soviet archives of Gestapo files, referred to him as an "enthusiastic co-worker and trustworthy propaganda orator."

Sokolov's defence lawyer, Brian Gildea, (who had previously unsuccessfully defended Feodor Fedorenko) denied the charges levelled against Sokolov, arguing he had only been following orders, claimed he was the victim of Soviet smear tactics for his émigré status, claimed he was a Zionist, deferred all guilt onto Oktan (who, according to John Loftus, was alive and living in the United States as late as 1979), and brought in Clifford Smith, a former Displaced Persons Commission official, to argue that Sokolov had been a forced labourer. During cross-examination, however, Smith, admitted that he did not know Sokolov.

Sokolov's trial attracted attention from American conservative figure William F. Buckley Jr., who wrote a personal letter to President Ronald Reagan requesting his intervention on Sokolov's behalf. Among Sokolov's defenders was also Alexander M. Schenker, a Polish Jew and Holocaust survivor who worked alongside him at Yale, and Strobe Talbott, future Deputy Secretary of State under Bill Clinton, who claimed that the charges against Sokolov had been falsified by the KGB. Also involved in the case was future Chief Justice of the United States John Roberts, who sought to keep Reagan and then-Attorney General William French Smith from intervening.

In the end, however, neither Reagan nor Smith intervened, and Sokolov's citizenship was revoked in June 1986. The case was subsequently appealed to the United States District Court for the District of Connecticut a year later, and to the Supreme Court the same year. However, in 1988, Sokolov fled the United States to the monastery of an Orthodox monk in Montreal, Canada, and applied for refugee status. This caused protests by the Canadian Jewish Congress, who accused the Canadian government of a "very weak" response to Nazi war criminals living in Canada and urged for immediate action.

Samarin died on 19 January 1992, less than a month after the dissolution of the Soviet Union, in Montreal.
