= Gautier le Leu =

French minstrel

Gautier le Leu (born 1210?), sometimes referred to as Gautier le Long, was a French minstrel who wrote in the middle of the 13th century. He is one of the most important authors of fabliaux, six of which are attributed to him (mostly on erotic and scatological topics) and also wrote two dits, a poem of proverbs, and a longer narrative poem. He is thought to have originated from the County of Hainaut, in what is today Belgium. He may have received clerical training in Orléans or Cologne.

== Works attributed to Gautier le Leu ==
=== Fabliaux ===
- "Sot Chevalier" (also known as "Aventure d'Ardennes")
- "Deus Vilains"
- "Fol Vilain"
- "Les Sohais"
- "Connebert" (also known as "Le prestre ki perdi les colles")
- "Prestre taint" (authorship disputed)

=== Dits ===
- "Du Con"
- "Des Cons"

=== Proverbe ===
- "Dieu et lou Pescour"

=== "Romans" ===
- "Veuve" (called "romans" by the author; usually classified as a fabliau also)
