= A Spruce Was Born in the Forest =

"В лесу родилась ёлочка"

Song
- Language: Russian
- English title: A Spruce Was Born in the Forest
- Genre: Christmas song, New Year song, children's song
- Composer: Leonid Karlovich Beckman
- Lyricist: Raisa Adamovna Kudasheva

"A Spruce Was Born in the Forest" (Russian: В лесу роди́лась ёлочка) is one of the most popular Russian children's Christmas songs, which became a New Year song in the USSR. The lyrics were written by Raisa Adamovna Kudasheva, the music by Leonid Karlovich Beckman.

Russian Reporter magazine conducted a sociological study in 2015, the lyrics of the song took 29th place in the top 100 most popular lines of poetry in Russia.

== History ==
Initially, Raisa Kudasheva published the poem "Yolka" (Russian: Ёлка) in the children's magazine "Malyutka" (Russian: Малютка) in 1903. And 2 years later, Leonid Beckman composed a melody for it for the birthday of his eldest daughter. He had no musical education, played the piano by ear, but improvised easily and sang excellently. The melody of the song was transferred to the notes by his wife, pianist Yelena Beckman-Shcherbina, who graduated from the Moscow Conservatory.

After the October Revolution, celebration of Christmas was forbidden by the Bolsheviks, and the song was forgotten. In 1935 the Christmas tree was "rehabilitated" in the form of the "New Year spruce" for children. In 1941 Esfir Moiseyevna Emden compiled a poetic New Year's collection, which gave the song a second life.

== Lyrics ==
Cyrillic	Transliteration	Literal translation
В лесу родилась ёлочка, В лесу она росла. Зимой и летом стройная, Зелёная была. Метель ей пела песенку: «Спи, ёлочка, бай-бай!» Мороз снежком укутывал: «Смотри, не замерзай!» Трусишка зайка серенький Под ёлочкой скакал. Порою волк, сердитый волк, Рысцою пробегал. Чу! Снег по лесу частому Под полозом скрипит. Лошадка мохноногая Торопится, бежит. Везёт лошадка дровеньки, На дровнях мужичок. Срубил он нашу ёлочку Под самый корешок. Теперь ты здесь, нарядная, На праздник к нам пришла И много, много радости Детишкам принесла.	V lesu rodilas yolochka, V lesu ona rosla. Zimoy i letom stroynaya, Zelyonaya byla. Metel yey pela pesenku: «Spi, yolochka, bay-bay!» Moroz snezhkom ukutyval: «Smotri, ne zamerzay!» Trusishka zayka serenkiy Pod yolochkoy skakal. Poroyu volk, serdityy volk, Rystsoyu probegal. Chu! Sneg po lesu chastomu Pod polozom skripit. Loshadka mokhnonogaya Toropitsya, bezhit. Vezyot loshadka drovenki, Na drovnyakh muzhichok. Srubil on nashu yolochku Pod samyy koreshok. Teper ty zdes, naryadnaya, Na prazdnik k nam prishla I mnogo, mnogo radosti Detishkam prinesla.	A spruce was born in the forest, It grew up in the forest. In winter and summer, it was slender, It was green. The blizzard sang a song to it: "Sleep, spruce, hushaby!" The frost wrapped it in a snow: "Look, don't freeze!" The little gray coward bunny Was jumping under the spruce. Sometimes a wolf, an angry wolf, Trotted by. Hark! Snow in the thick forest Сreaks under the sled runner. The shaggy-legged horsey Is in a hurry, running. A horsey is driving a wood sledge, A man is in the sledge. He cut down our spruce By very root. Now you're here, dressed up, You came to us for a holiday And brought a lot, a lot of joy To the kids.

There are several variations of the last verse, beginning with "now you're here, dressed up...", "and here it is, dressed up...", "now it is, dressed up..."
