= Richeut =

French fabliau

Richeut is the earliest known fabliau, dating from 1159. The only known manuscrit of the fabliau is preserved at the Burgerbibliothek of Berne under the classification number 354, f. 124va-135va.

Although Richeut shares many of the same characteristics as other fabliaux, it has several unique features: 1. It mentions the outcome of a sexual encounter. 2. It breaks the taboo of incest. 3. It is unusually long, containing 1019 lines. 4. It does not use octosyllables, but a tailrhyme strophe. 5. It has character development. 6. The characters of Richeut and Herselot, the maid, exist outside of this text.

== Summary ==
This tale recounts the life of a prostitute who uses men to her advantage. She does not discriminate between classes, for she dupes a nobleman, a bourgeois and a clergyman into believing that they are the father of her son, whom she conceived on purpose because she felt that they were no longer paying her enough attention. All three men lavish her and her son with gifts to the point of ruining themselves. Her son, Samson, grows up with all of the privileges that money can buy. Bored by his surroundings, he boasts to his mother that his education is complete for he can easily lead any woman into his bed and, subsequently, into the whorehouse. His mother ridicules him and warns him of the treacherous ways of women. Slighted, Samson claims that no woman will ever make a fool of him and heads out into the world. Along his journeys, he conquers women of all nations and cheats men at dice, even becoming a monk at Clairvaux Abbey for a brief period of time. After twelve years of deflowering, pimping and dicing, he returns to his mother's hometown. Although he does not recognize her, she knows him and sets out to prove wrong his last boast to her. She tricks him into believing that Herselot, her faithful servant, is a young virgin whom he could never convince to go to bed with him. Intent upon proving her incorrect, he sets out to triumph over the unconquerable and believes to have succeeded. During the act however, he discovers that she is no more a virgin than he is. In the meantime, Richeut convinces seven men of her acquaintance to beat her son, but not kill him. Before Samson can leave Herselot's bed, the men beat him with Richeut intervening, pretending to save him from these men. His boast of twelve years earlier has thus been proven wrong.
