= Timeline of Skanderbeg =

This timeline lists important events relevant to the life of the Albanian feudal lord and military commander Gjergj Kastrioti Skanderbeg (6 May 1405 – 17 January 1468), widely known as Skanderbeg.

== 1405 ==
- 6 May – Skanderbeg was born in one of the two villages owned by his grandfather Pal Kastrioti, in the Debar region (now along the border between Albania and North Macedonia). He was a member of the Kastrioti family. Skanderbeg's father was Gjon Kastrioti (an Ottoman vassal since 1385) and his mother was Voisava. Skanderbeg's parents had nine children, of which he was the youngest son. His older brothers were Reposh, Stanisha and Kostandin, and his sisters were Mara, Jelena, Mamica, Angjelina and Vlajka.

== 1409 ==
- Gjon Kastrioti sent his eldest son, Stanisha, as a hostage to the Sultan.

== 1423 ==
- Gjon Kastrioti sent Skanderbeg to the Sultan's court as a hostage.
- Skanderbeg was circumcised.
- Skanderbeg soon won the Sultan's trust and was treated as his own son by Murad, who promoted him to the highest ranks of the Ottoman army.

== 1423 – 1425 ==
- The Ottomans gave Skanderbeg a military education at the Enderun in Edirne.

== 1426 ==
- The First Act of Hilandar appeared as a document written in the Serbian language and Cyrillic script, which is the first written document that contains the name of George Kastriot.
- In the period 1426 – 1431, Gjon Kastrioti and his three sons (Stanisha, Reposh and Gjergj) acquired four adelphates (rights to reside on monastic territory and to receive subsidies from monastic resources) to the St. George Tower of Hilandar and to some property within the monastery, as stated in the Second Act of Hilandar.

== 1428 ==
- Stefan Maramonte went to the Ottoman court and met Skanderbeg there.
- Based on the Ottoman graduation system (Turkish: çıkma), the Sultan granted Skanderbeg a timar. This timar was near to the territories controlled by his father Gjon Kastrioti (Turkish: Yuvan-eli).
- April – Gjon Kastrioti sent a letter to Venice expressing his concern that his son Skanderbeg would probably be ordered by the Sultan to occupy his territory.
- Gjon Kastrioti had to ask forgiveness from the Venetian Senate for Skanderbeg's participation in Ottoman military campaigns against Christians.

== 1430 – 1431 ==
- Gjon Kastrioti was defeated in battle by the Ottoman governor of Skopje, Isa bey Evrenos, and as a result his territorial holdings were greatly reduced.
- Skanderbeg earned the title of sipahi for his merits in the expeditions of Murad II.
- Skanderbeg's brother Reposh died as a monk in Hilandar, where he was buried.

== 1432 – 1436 ==
- Although Skanderbeg was summoned home by his relatives when Gjergj Arianiti and Andrea Thopia with other chiefs from the region between Vlorë and Shkodër organized a rebellion against the Ottoman Empire in the period 1432 – 1436, he did nothing, remaining loyal to the Sultan.
- Skanderbeg commanded Ottoman cavalry in many different battles in Europe and Asia bringing slaves and loot to Ottoman capital Adrianople. According to Fan Noli, during a battle in Anatolia, he was the first to climb the wall, raise the Ottoman flag, and was the first of the Ottoman forces to enter the besieged fortress.

== 1437 ==
- Gjon Kastrioti died.
- Skanderbeg expected that he would succeed his father and became the lord of the Kastiotis's domain.
- Skanderbeg's expectations were not fulfilled. The Ottomans annexed Gjon's former domain and appointed Skanderbeg timariot of a timar consisting of nine villages in the high mountains that had belonged to Gjon until his death.
- Skanderbeg became subaşi of the Krujë Subaşilik of the Sanjak of Albania in the period 1437 – 1438.
- November – Hizir bey was appointed as subaşi of the Krujë Subaşilik instead of Skanderbeg.

== 1438 ==
- Skanderbeg continued to fight within the Ottoman forces.
- May – Skanderbeg's timar (of the vilayet of Dhimitër Jonima), consisting of nine villages in the high mountains that once belonged to his father John (this timar was listed in Ottoman registers as John's land, Turkish: Yuvan-ili), was awarded to André Karlo.
- The granting of these villages to André Karlo must have upset Skanderbeg who asked to be granted control of the zeamet in Misia, which consisted of his father's former domain. Sanjak-bey (probably of the Sanjak of Ohrid) objected Skanderbeg's request.

== 1439 ==
- 7 July – A letter from Skanderbeg and the widow of Gjon Kastrioti was presented to the Dubrovnik City Council by their procurator, the priest Petar. The letter was written in Slavic language and contained their request to inherit 123 ducats that two merchants from Dubrovnik owed to Gjon Kastrioti for customs that they did not pay on time. Their request was accepted.

== 1440 ==
- Skanderbeg was appointed as the sanjak-bey of the Sanjak of Dibra.

== 1443 ==
- August – Gjergj Arianiti again rebelled against the Ottomans, probably urged on by Pope Eugene IV or incited by the news of Hadım Şehabeddin's defeat.
- Early November – Skanderbeg participated in the Battle of Niš fighting for the Ottoman Empire under Kasim Pasha against the allied forces of John Hunyadi, Władysław III of Poland and Đurađ Branković.
- Early November – After the Ottoman forces were defeated in the Battle of Niš, Skanderbeg forced an Ottoman scribe to forge a letter in which Sultan Murad II appointed Skanderbeg as governor of Krujë. According to some earlier sources, Skanderbeg deserted the Ottoman army during the Battle of Kunovica on 2 January 1444.
- 28 November – Together with his nephew Hamza Kastrioti and 300 Ottoman soldiers from Albania Skanderbeg arrived in Krujë and used the forged letter to gain control of Krujë from Zabel Pasha.
- Soon after Skanderbeg captured Krujë, his rebels managed to capture many Ottoman fortresses, including the strategically important Svetigrad (Kodžadžik), taken with the support of Moisi Golemi and 3,000 rebels from Debar.
- According to some sources, Skanderbeg impaled captured Ottoman soldiers who refused to be baptised into Christianity.

== 1444 ==
- 2 March – A meeting of local regional nobles from Albania was organised in the Venetian city of Lezhë, Venetian Albania. They agreed to form an alliance, the League of Lezhë, to fight the Ottoman Empire under Skanderbeg's command.
- 29 June – Skanderbeg was victorious against the Ottoman forces in the Battle of Torvioll.
- Skanderbeg's troops stole cattle from the people of Lezhë and captured their women and children.
- 10 November – After winning the Battle of Varna against John Hunyadi's crusaders, Sultan Murad II tried to persuade Skanderbeg to return under Ottoman suzerainty. Skanderbeg refused.
- Nikollë Dukagjini ambushed and killed another member of the League, Lekë Zaharia.
- Dukagjini's attempt to capture Zaharia's fortress Dagnum failed.
- Zaharia's mother ceded the fortress of Dagnum and all other possessions belonging to her murdered son Zaharia (Drivast, Sati, Gladri and Dushmani) to Venice.

== 1445 ==
- 12 February – The Senate of the Republic of Venice confirmed to Skanderbeg and his brother Stanisha that Venice would have the same obligations towards them as it had towards their father, promising them Venetian citizenship and safe conduct should their enemies drive them out.
- 10 October – Skanderbeg and his forces were victorious in the Battle of Mokra, fought on the mountain of Mokra in Macedonia.

== 1446 ==
- Spring – Through Ragusan diplomats, Skanderbeg asked the Pope and the Kingdom of Hungary for help against the Ottomans.
- 27 September – Skanderbeg was victorious in the Battle of Otonetë (north of Debar, Macedonia).
- Gjergj Arianiti allied with the Kingdom of Naples.

== 1447 ==
- Skanderbeg was seduced by Alfonso V into waging a war against Venice.
- Skanderbeg's envoys visited the Serbian Despot Đurađ Branković. Branković gave them cordial reception and informed them that he wished to see people from Albania to take Dagnum from the Venetians. Branković promised to help Skanderbeg to fight against the Venetian Republic.
- Skanderbeg proclaimed himself heir to the Balsha and emphasised his intention to gain control of their former domains.
- Skanderbeg claimed to Venice all their towns which were pronoia of the murdered Lekë Zaharia (Dagnum, Drivast, Sati, Gladri and Dushmani) and also Drivast as it belonged to the Serbian Despotate before Venice conquered it.
- Venice rejected Skanderbeg's claim and offered him 1,000 ducats to drop all claims.
- Skanderbeg rejected the Venetian offer.
- Skanderbeg attacked Durrës.
- Skanderbeg failed to capture the Venetian cities of Bar and Ulcinj after unsuccessful attacks he conducted on behalf of the Kingdom of Naples with forces of the Serbian Despotate led by Đurađ Branković and forces of the Principality of Zeta led by Stefan Crnojević.
- December – Skanderbeg besieged Dagnum, but failed to capture it.
- December – Skanderbeg's forces rebuilt the fortress of Baleč and established a garrison of 2,000 men in it, with Marin Spani as commander.
- December – Venetian forces (also led by Andrija and Kojčin Humoj, together with Simeon Vulkata) drove Skanderbeg's forces from the Baleč garrison.
- December – Skanderbeg plundered the area around Durrës.

== 1448 ==
- 4 March – Venice offered a life pension of 100 gold ducats a year to the person who would kill Skanderbeg.
- Skanderbeg sent a detachment of his troops into the rural areas of the Kingdom of Naples to suppress a rebellion against Alfonso V. Many of them settled there.
- April – Skanderbeg's forces besieged Durrës and he demanded from its citizens an annual provision of 400 ducats and two sets of clothing. The citizens of Durrës were willing to accept his request, but the Senate later rejected such an idea, believing that separate peaces would divide the weak Venetian forces in the area between Durrës and Kotor.
- May – The Venetian Senate accepted offers from some people who promised to kill Skanderbeg for a life pension of 100 ducats a year.
- The Venetian Senate sent a messenger to the Ottoman Sultan asking that Skanderbeg be punished "because Skanderbeg is an Ottoman citizen and we have a solid peace with the Ottoman Empire".
- Ottoman forces under the command of Sultan Murad II fought against Skanderbeg with limited success, retaking only part of Skanderbeg's territory.
- Murad mobilised two armies to attack Skanderbeg. One army of 10,000 cavalry led by Ali Feriz Pasha, the supreme commander of the Ottoman forces in Europe, and another of 15,000 cavalry and infantry under the command of Mustapha Pasha.
- June – In an action coordinated with Skanderbeg, the Lord of the Serbian Despotate attacked Venetian towns in the region of Kotor, Budva and Bar.
- When the Ottoman forces attacked Skanderbeg, the Venetians were no longer worried about him. They decided not to make peace with him, but to destroy him and the nobles allied with him. Therefore, the Venetians decided not to allow them to take refuge in their cities. At the same time, the Venetians opened the gates of their cities to the peasants fleeing from the Ottomans, leaving Skanderbeg and the noblemen allied with him without the supplies provided by these peasants.
- 23 July – Skanderbeg was victorious near Shkodër, against a Venetian force of 15,000 men under the command of Daniele Iurichi, governor of Scutari.
- 31 July – Skanderbeg lost Svetigrad to the Ottoman Empire after the siege (14 May - 31 July).
- Skanderbeg's forces, under the command of Hamza Kastrioti, were defeated after attacking the Venetian fortress at Dagnum.
- Murad II abandoned his campaign after receiving news of preparations for the new crusade.
- 14 August – Skanderbeg was victorious in the Battle of Oranik.
- 19 September – The fire devastated Scutari, damaging the city walls and killing around 500 people. This reduced the city's defensive potential and increased the danger of Skanderbeg's attacks.
- After the Venetian Senate received news that the Serbian Despot was preparing another attack on their positions in Zeta, on the 19th of October the Senate gave orders to the Governor of Scutari to sign a peace treaty with Skanderbeg or to destroy his forces if he refused peace. This order came too late, as the governor of Scutari had already signed a treaty with Skanderbeg 15 days earlier.
- 4 October – Skanderbeg signed the capitulation to the Venetians in Shkodër (disguised as a peace treaty). Venice was obliged to pay Skanderbeg 1,400 dukats a year, but never did. Skanderbeg was also forced to join an anti-Ottoman coalition led by John Hunyadi.
- Skanderbeg asked the Republic of Ragusa for a loan to fight the Ottomans. He gave the Ragusan Senate falcons as a gift.
- The Ragusan Senate rejected Skanderbeg's request and granted him 200 ducats.
- Hunyadi was defeated in the Battle of Kosovo on 17-20 October, while Skanderbeg failed to gather enough supplies to finance his forces to join Hunyadi's campaign. He was believed to have been delayed by Đurađ Branković, then allied with Sultan Murad II, whose land Skanderbeg and his forces ravaged as punishment for deserting the Christian cause.
- At a meeting on the 14th of November, the Senate decided what to do with the falcons presented by Skanderbeg.

== 1449 ==
- In 1449, Gjergj Arianiti left his alliance with Skanderbeg.
- Skanderbeg tried to recapture Svetigrad, but failed.
- Skanderbeg and Arianiti approached the Venetians and asked for protection. The Venetians decided to remain neutral so as not to jeopardise peace with the Ottomans and refused their request.
- April – Skanderbeg offered 6,000 ducats to gain protectorate status from the Republic of Venice. The same amount he had to pay to the Ottoman Empire as its vassal after he was forced to submit to Ottoman suzerainty. The Venetians rejected Skanderbeg's offers, telling him that they "didn't want property that belongs to someone else", while emphasising their willingness to help Skanderbeg negotiate peace with the Ottomans. Skanderbeg supported the Venetian appointment of Ivan Crnojević as Duke.
- Skanderbeg asked Venice to allow his cattle to graze on Venetian territory (the villages of Medoa and Vilipoje). Venice allowed him to do so.
- Skanderbeg sent another detachment of troops to Italy to garrison Sicily against rebellion and invasion. This time the troops were led by the brothers Giorgio and Basilio Reres, sons of Demetrios.

== 1450 ==
- Skanderbeg sent a letter to Ragusa, informing its nobles that the Ottoman Sultan would attack him.
- Skanderbeg organised the beginning of the construction of the Rodoni Castle.
- The League of Lezhë collapsed as Ottoman forces approached.
- Skanderbeg left Krujë before it was besieged.
- 14 May – The Ottoman siege of Krujë began.
- Arianiti asked the Venetians to work for peace between the Sultan and Skanderbeg if the Ottomans did not take Krujë.
- 14 October – Skanderbeg offered Krujë to the Venetians, threatening to surrender the fortress to the Ottomans if they did not accept.
- 26 October – Murad lifted the siege of Krujë.
- The Venetians responded to Skanderbeg's offer by rejecting it and offering to help Skanderbeg harmonise his relations with the Ottomans.
- Peace was agreed between the Ottomans and Skanderbeg, who was again obliged to pay tribute to the Sultan.
- Skanderbeg was at the end of his resources. He lost all his possessions except Krujë. Other Albanian nobles allied themselves with Murad. After the Ottoman withdrawal, they continued to fight against Skanderbeg's efforts to impose his authority.
- Skanderbeg travelled to Ragusa to seek the financial support of the Ragusans and the Pope.

== 1451 ==
- January – Skanderbeg was appointed as "Captain General of the King of Aragon".
- 3 February – Sultan Murad II dies and Mehmed the Conqueror begins his reign. He had much bigger plans in mind than the capture of Krujë, as he planned to take Byzantine-held Constantinople. After the dissolution of the League of Lezhë, unaware of the new Ottoman plans, Skanderbeg believed he was forced to seek outside help.
- 26 March – Skanderbeg received outside support by signing the Treaty of Gaeta and recognising the suzerainty of the Kingdom of Naples.
- Late May – The Neapolitan military officer Bernat Vaquer, sent by Alfonso V with a hundred infantry, took Krujë in the name of the Kingdom of Naples and placed its garrison under his command.
- Pal Dukagjini and Peter Spani remained allied to Venice and established friendly relations with the Sultan.
- 21 April – Skanderbeg married Donika Kastrioti, daughter of Gjergj Arianiti, in the Eastern Orthodox Ardenica Monastery.
- Venice continued its efforts to turn Skanderbeg's allies against the Kingdom of Naples and Skanderbeg. Gjergj Arianiti cut himself off from Albanian politics, while Pal Dukagjini, a member of the Dukagjini Family and father of Lekë Dukagjini, prepared for war against Skanderbeg.

== 1452 ==
- 23 – 25 April – Alfonso V appointed Ramon d'Ortafa governor of Krujë and Albania. He also informed Johan de Castro, a castellan of Krujë at the time, of this appointment and ordered him to hand over the city to d'Ortafa. Alfonso V sent letters to Skanderbeg, George Arianiti and other tribal leaders in Albania to inform them of d'Ortafa's appointment and to instruct them to accept his rule.
- Rodoni Castle has been built.
- Spring – Giammaria Biemmi claims that Dukagjini tried to kill Skanderbeg in the spring of 1452. It is not possible to confirm this claim, which is supported by some scholars, as well as the information that Skanderbeg and Dukagjini made peace on 25 September 1452.
- 21 July – Skanderbeg was victorious in the Battle of Modrič. and Battle of Meçad where his forces killed Tahip Pasha and captured Hamza Pasha who was ransomed for 13,000 dukats.
- July – Dukagjini opted for a reconciliation with Skanderbeg.
- Autumn – Skanderbeg sent his troops to help the Venetians thwart an attack by the Serbian Despotate on the Venetian city of Cattaro.

== 1453 ==
- 5 March – Alfonso sent a letter censuring Venice for not paying its dues to Skanderbeg and also for supporting Skanderbeg's enemies. He urged that all Albanian – Venetian conflicts be settled by force.
- 22 April – Skanderbeg was victorious in the Battle of Polog, fought near modern-day Tetovo in North Macedonia.
- Alfonso promised to send Skanderbeg men and an annual pension of 1,500 ducats, while Pope Nicholas V sent 5,000 florins.
- 18 September – The Venetians sent a letter to Skanderbeg expressing their gratitude for his willingness to help them negotiate peace with the Serbian Despot.
- 25 September – Ragusa decided to give the deposits of Stefan Branković to Skanderbeg's envoys.
- 9 October – The Venetian Senate informed Skanderbeg that his request to be accompanied by the Venetian governor of Alessio on his journey to Rome and Naples has been granted.
- 6 December – Alfonso V assured Pedro Skuder, castellan of Krujë, that Krujë will receive the necessary supplies.

== 1454 ==
- Ramon d'Ortafà minted coins in Krujë.
- 9 October – The Venetian Senate allowed the governor of Alessio, Petro Marcello, to accompany Skanderbeg on his journey to Italy.
- 21 October – Alfonso V writes from his Castel Nuovo to Skanderbeg that Pal Dukagjini has sent his envoys and declared his loyalty and vassalage to the Kingdom of Naples. Based on this, Alfonso V granted Pal Dukagjini 300 ducats of annual provisions.
- In a letter brought to Alfonso V by Paolo Cuccia, Skanderbeg requested support for an attack on Ottoman-held Berat.

== 1455 ==
- July – Skanderbeg's forces (supported by a strong contingent of Neapolitans from Alfonso V) were badly defeated when they failed to take Berat during the Siege of Berat. Muzaka Thopia was killed in the battle, while Golemi deserted to the Ottomans.

== 1456 ==
- Late March – Skanderbeg was victorious in the Battle of Oranik, where he defeated his former companion Golemi; the latter had allied himself with the Ottomans.
- April – Golemi returned to Skanderbeg and joined his forces.
- May – Gjergj Arianiti allied with Venice.
- Venice appointed Gjergj Arianiti on the position of captain of the Venetian Albania, which additionally weakened Skanderbeg's cause.
- According to Fan Noli, Gjergj Balsha sold the fortress of Modrič to the Ottomans for 30,000 silver ducats. He tried to cover up the deed, but his treachery was discovered and he was sent to prison in Naples.
- 4 November – According to reports sent to the Duchy of Milan, Skanderbeg helped Lekë Dukagjini capture the Venetian-held Dagnum.
- 9 November – According to one report, the Venetians had intended to attack Skanderbeg because he was a supporter of Alfonso V, to whom he granted Krujë, so Skanderbeg's men will have to go all the way to the Venetian-held Durrës or Shkodër if they want to fight the Ottomans.
- Skanderbeg's son Gjon was born.
- Hamza Kastrioti, Skanderbeg's own nephew and his close collaborator, defected to the Ottomans.

== 1457 ==
- June – Gjergj Pelini, Skanderbeg's diplomat, brought Skanderbeg's letter to Venice, complaining that the Venetians were not regularly paying him the agreed provisions.
- On Skanderbeg's behalf, Pelini went on a diplomatic mission to Pope Callixtus III and convinced him to continue paying his allowances to Skanderbeg.
- July – Skanderbeg asked the Venetians to allow his forces to cross Venetian territory because they wanted to attack Ottoman positions in Upper Zeta. The Senate refused his request.
- August – The Venetians recaptured Dagnum from Lekë Dukagjini after a fierce battle and heavy losses. The Venetian forces, led by Andrea Venier, were supported by Skanderbeg.
- 2 September – Skanderbeg was victorious in the Battle of Albulena. He captured Hamza Kastrioti and sent him to prison in the Kingdom of Naples.

== 1458 ==
- 27 June – Alfonso V died.
- Skanderbeg accepted Ottoman suzerainty.
- 27 July – According to some reports, the Ottoman Empire conquered the Albanian mountains and Skanderbeg came to Krujë with 200 soldiers given to him by Ferdinand I of Naples. The commander of the Krujë garrison is said to have feared that Skanderbeg would surrender Krujë to the Ottomans and did not allow him to enter the castle. Skanderbeg returned to Lezhë and some rumours say that he intended to ask the Hungarian King for help.

== 1459 ==
- 2 April – Skanderbeg wrote a receipt in Serbian confirming that he had collected 500 ducats from his deposit in Ragusa.
- 7 June – Skanderbeg sends another letter to the Ragusans, informing them that they should receive his envoy Ninac Vukoslavić, who has been sent to seek their help.
- 13 June – Skanderbeg sends another letter to the Ragusans, informing them that he has collected 900 – 1,000 ducats from his deposit.
- June – Skanderbeg ceded the Sati fortress to Venice in order to establish cordial relations with Venice before sending his forces to Italy to help Ferdinand I, who was suffering from a dynastic dispute after the death of Alfonso V. Before the Venetians took control of Sati, Skanderbeg captured it and the surrounding area, driving out Lekë Dukagjini and his forces, who had opposed Skanderbeg and destroyed Sati before the Venetian takeover.
- Although Skanderbeg intended to accept the Ottoman proposal for a three-year truce, Pope Pius II would not allow it and he had to reject it. To show his discontent, Skanderbeg refused to attend the Council of Mantua held to plan the future crusade.

== 1460 ==
- Skanderbeg sent his nephew, Constantine Kastrioti, with 500 cavalry to Barletta to fight for Ferdinand I.
- Skanderbeg appointed Gjergj Pelini, abbot of Ratac Abbey, as his procurator.
- In the mid-1460s, the dethroned Serbian Despot Stefan Branković came to Albania to visit his relatives. Skanderbeg gave him an unknown amount of money to support him. Stefan married Angjelina, the sister of Donika, who married Skanderbeg.

== 1461 ==
- At the beginning of 1461, Stefan Branković went to Italy with Skanderbeg's written recommendation. According to some sources, Stefan remained in Albania until 1466. He stayed with Skanderbeg and supported his anti-Ottoman struggle, making plans to retake Serbia and Smederevo from the Ottomans.
- April – The Ragusan Senate promised Skanderbeg safe haven from the Ottomans should he need it.
- Mid June – Skanderbeg agreed to a ceasefire with Mehmed II which was agreed to last for three years. This ceasefire was more favorable to the Ottomans than to Skanderbeg's forces.
- Skanderbeg went to Italy to join his nephew in the struggle for Ferdinand I.

== 1462 ==
- Venice stopped paying provisions to Skanderbeg and this brought them close to armed conflict with Skanderbeg.
- April – The Venetian Senate wrote to the governor of Shkodër to calm Skanderbeg, using Pelini as a mediator. Pelini was successful, and the Venetian Senate continued to pay Skanderbeg (a total of 600 ducats per year), agreeing to pay him all withheld provisions.
- 7 July – Skanderbeg was victorious in the Battle of Mokra against the Ottoman forces led by Sinan bey.
- August – Skanderbeg was victorious in three battles against the Ottomans in just one month during his Macedonian campaign:
  - At Mokra against the forces of Hasan bey.
  - In Pollog against the forces of Isuf bey.
  - In Livad against the forces of Karaza bey.

== 1463 ==
- 26 April – The Venetians allowed Skanderbeg and his forces to cross the territory of the Venetian domains to support Stjepan Vukčić Kosača but Skanderbeg failed to carry out his promises for help.
- 27 April – Skanderbeg signed the Peace of Ushkub, a peace treaty with the Ottoman Empire. This peace treaty was more favourable to the Ottomans than to Skanderbeg's forces.
- Skanderbeg's envoy Andrija Snaticho, an abbot of the Ratac Abbey, went to Venice to offer an alliance on Skanderbeg's behalf.
- 1 August – The Venetian Senate decided to send an envoy ("unus nobilis orator") to make peace between Stjepan Kosača and his son Vladislav and between Skanderbeg and the neighbouring nobles.
- 20 August – Skanderbeg signed a treaty of alliance with Venice, and based on this treaty he fought as their ally during the Ottoman-Venetian War until his death.
- 25 September – The Venetian Senate accepts Skanderbeg's son Gjon Kastrioti II as a Venetian noble, a member of the Great Council of Venice.
- 15 October – On behalf of Skanderbeg, Paladin Gundulić signed a contract with some craftsmen to build a ship for Skanderbeg on the territory of Albania. They were paid in advance on the condition that they would not return from Albania until they had built a ship.
- November – Pope announced his intention to organise a crusade against the Ottoman Empire, with Skanderbeg as one of its main leaders.
- Lekë Dukagjini agreed to join the crusade only after Pope's intervention.

== 1464 ==
- Spring – Envoys from Stefan Branković and Skanderbeg visited Pope together, asking for his help in the fight against the Ottomans and for Branković's return to Smederevo.
- 14 or 15 September – Skanderbeg and his Venetian allies were victorious in the Battle of Ohrid against the forces of Şeremet bey, sanjak-bey of the Sanjak of Ohrid.

== 1465 ==
- April – Some of Skanderbeg's most trusted men were captured by Ottoman forces under the command of Ballaban Badera, a new sanjak-bey of the sanjak of Ohrid, during the Battle of Vaikal. They were executed after 15 days of torture.
- June – Skanderbeg defeated Ottoman forces led by Ballaban Badera at the Battle of Meçad near Oranik in Upper Dibra, Macedonia.
- August – Skanderbeg defeated Ottoman forces led by Ballaban Badera in another Battle of Vaikal, near Oranik.
- August – Skanderbeg defeated Ottoman forces led by Jakup Arnauti in the Battle of Kashari.

== 1466 ==
- June – The siege of Krujë began with Skanderbeg being outside of Krujë.
- July – Elbasan Castle was built by the Ottoman Empire.
- July – Skanderbeg supported the Venetian appointment of Ivan Crnojević as duke.
- 14 August – The Venetian Senate asked Skanderbeg to attack Elbasan Castle (with the help of the forces of the Venetian provveditori of Venetian Albania).
- Skanderbeg's attempt to capture Elbasan failed.
- Skanderbeg retreated to the Rodoni Castle from where he and his family, along with many people from Albania, were transported to Brindisi in 14 ships.
- Dorotheos, the Archbishop of Ohrid and his clerks and boyars were exiled to Constantinople in 1466, probably because of their anti-Ottoman activities during Skanderbeg's rebellion.
- Late October – Skanderbeg began his journey to Italy, while Krujë remained under siege.
- 2 November – The Ragusan Senate issued a decree instructing three nobles to inform Skanderbeg not to enter the territory of Ragusa.
- 12 December – Skanderbeg reached Rome. According to eyewitnesses, he arrived in poverty, with only a few horses.
- December – Pope Paul II gave Skanderbeg 300 ducats to support his stay in Rome and offered him lodgings in the Palazzo Venezia, but Skanderbeg decided to stay at his friend's house in the same square.
- 25 December – Pope invited Skanderbeg to a ceremony where he was awarded with a sword and helmet.

== 1467 ==
- 7 January – Together with the Pope, Skanderbeg attended to a consistory and discussed the Pope's unsuccessful appeal to fund Skanderbeg with 5,000 ducats.
- 14 February – Skanderbeg departed from Rome.
- February and March
  - Skanderbeg visited Ferdinand I, who granted him 1,500 ducats and 300 carts of grain.
  - Ferdinand I and the Ottoman ambassador signed a peace treaty.
  - Skanderbeg left the court of Ferdinand I and returned to Albania.
- Spring
  - Skanderbeg met with Giosafat Barbaro in Shkodër, the Venetian provveditore in Venetian Albania, and gathered support from Venetian nobles.
  - Skanderbeg met with Lekë Dukagjini and other northern Albanian nobles in Lezhë, where once distant nobles, along with the lukewarm Dukagjini, allied with Skanderbeg to attack Ballaban's forces.
- 23 April – Skanderbeg entered Krujë.
- April – May – Skanderbeg attacked Elbasan, but his attempt to take it failed. He only managed to lay waste to the lower town, but its citadel withstood the assaults of Skanderbeg's forces.
- Summer
  - Sultan Mehmed II besieged Krujë, while the Grand Vizier Mahmud Pasha Angelović pursued Skanderbeg, who had fled to the coast.
  - Ottoman forces destroyed the Rodoni Castle. The Ottomans plundered Albanian territory and took many people into slavery. Skanderbeg's forces were nearing their end.
- 28 July – The Venetian Senate invited Skanderbeg to defend Shkodër, Krujë and Durrës, while Venice would provide armies and funds.
- According to some accounts, Skanderbeg and his forces, backed by the Venetian fleet, repelled an Ottoman attempt to capture Durrës.

== 1468 ==
- January – Skanderbeg attempted to organise a meeting of the local nobles in Lezhë.
- 17 January – Skanderbeg died of malaria in Lezhë, Venetian Albania. He was buried in the Church of Saint Nicholas.
- 24 February – Ferdinand I ordered to inform Skanderbeg's widow and son that he will give them a ship and accept them into his kingdom.
Timeline of Skanderbeg
Lords of Kastrioti's domain during Skanderbeg's life
Pal
Gjon
No domain
Skanderbeg
Suzerainty over Kastrioti's domain during Skanderbeg's life
Ottoman
Venice
Ottoman
No domain
Independent
Vassal of Naples
(de facto independent)
Skanderbeg's religion
Christian
Muslim
Christian
│
1405
│
1408
│
1411
│
1414
│
1417
│
1420
│
1423
│
1426
│
1429
│
1432
│
1435
│
1438
│
1441
│
1444
│
1447
│
1450
│
1453
│
1456
│
1459
│
1462
│
1465
│
1468

== Bibliography ==
- Anamali, Skënder (2002), Historia e popullit shqiptar në katër vëllime (in Albanian), vol. I, Botimet Toena, OCLC 52411919
- Babinger, Franz (1992), Mehmed the Conqueror and His Time, Princeton University Press, ISBN 0-691-01078-1
- Božić, Ivan (1979), Nemirno pomorje XV veka (in Serbian), Beograd: Srpska književna zadruga, OCLC 5845972
- Drizari, Nelo (1968). Scanderbeg; His Life, Correspondence, Orations, Victories, and Philosophy. National Press. OCLC 729093.
- DS (1942). Spomenik Srpske kraljevske akademije. U Državnoj štampariji Kraljevne Srbije.
- Fine, John Van Antwerp (1994), The Late Medieval Balkans: A Critical Survey from the Late Twelfth Century to the Ottoman Conquest, University of Michigan Press, ISBN 9780472082605
- Frashëri, Kristo (2002), Gjergj Kastrioti Skënderbeu: jeta dhe vepra, 1405–1468 (in Albanian), Botimet Toena, ISBN 9992716274
- Gegaj, Athanase (1937), L'Albanie et l'Invasion turque au XVe siècle (in French), Universite de Louvain, ISBN 9780598935991, OCLC 652265147
- İnalcık, Halil (1995), From empire to republic: essays on Ottoman and Turkish social history, Isis Press, ISBN 978-975-428-080-7
- Myrdal, Jan (1976), Albania defiant, Monthly Review Press, ISBN 9780853453567
- Nasse, George Nicholas (1964), The Italo-Albanian Villages of Southern Italy, Washington D.C.: National Academies, ISBN 9780598204004, OCLC 476226177
- Noli, Fan Stilian (1947), George Castrioti Scanderbeg (1405–1468), International Universities Press, OCLC 732882
- Rosskeen Gibb, Sir Hamilton Alexander (1954), Encyclopedia of Islam
- Schmitt, Oliver Jens (2001), Das venezianische Albanien (1392-1479) (in German), München: R. Oldenbourg Verlag GmbH, ISBN 3-486-56569--9
- Schmitt, Oliver Jens (2009), Skanderbeg. Der neue Alexander auf dem Balkan (PDF), Verlag Friedrich Pustet, ISBN 978-3-7917-2229-0, archived from the original (PDF) on 2011-07-07
- Stavrides, Theoharis (2001), The Sultan of vezirs : the life and times of the Ottoman Grand Vezir Mahmud Pasha Angelovic (1453-1474), Leiden: Brill, ISBN 9789004121065, OCLC 46640850
- fakultet, Univerzitet u Beogradu. Filozofski (1964). Zbornik Filozofskog fakulteta. Naučno delo.
