= Skanderbeg's Italian expedition =

Expedition to aid Ferdinand I

Skanderbeg's Italian expedition Ekspedita italiane e Skënderbeut
- Part of the Neapolitan war of succession (1459–1464)
- Skanderbeg's voyage to Italy. The northern route was taken by Skanderbeg himself whereas the southern was taken by his subordinates.
| Date | 1460–1462 |
| Location | Southern Italy |
| Result | Albanian victory |
| Territorial changes | Ferdinand regains most of his lost territories |

Belligerents
| League of Lezhë; Papal States; Kingdom of Naples; Duchy of Milan | House of Anjou; Principality of Taranto; Pro-Angevin Italian nobles |

Commanders and leaders
| Skanderbeg; Kostandin Kastrioti; Ivan Strez Balšić; Pius II (Kingdom of Naples) Ferdinand I of Naples; Alessandro Sforza | René d'Anjou; Jean d'Anjou; Jacopo Piccinino; Giovanni Orsini |

Skanderbeg's Italian expedition (Albanian: Ekspedita italiane e Skënderbeut) (1460–1462) was undertaken to aid his ally Ferdinand I of Naples, whose rulership was threatened by the Angevin Dynasty. Gjergj Kastrioti Skanderbeg was the ruler of Albania (Latin: dominus Albaniae) who had been leading a rebellion against the Ottoman Empire since 1443 and allied himself with several European monarchs in order to consolidate his domains. In 1458, Alfonso V of Aragon, ruler of Sicily and Naples and Skanderbeg's most important ally, died, leaving his illegitimate son, Ferdinand, on the Neapolitan throne; René d'Anjou, the French Duke of Anjou, laid claim to the throne. The conflict between René's and Ferdinand's supporters soon erupted into a civil war. Pope Calixtus III, of Spanish background himself, could do little to secure Ferdinand, so he turned to Skanderbeg for aid.

In 1457, Skanderbeg had achieved his most famous victory over the Ottoman Empire at Albulena (Ujëbardha), which was received with great enthusiasm throughout Italy. In order to repay Alfonso for the financial and military assistance given to him years before, Skanderbeg took up the pope's pleas to help out Alfonso's son by sending a military expedition to Italy. Before leaving, Skanderbeg tried to negotiate a ceasefire with Sultan Mehmed II, the conqueror of Constantinople, to ensure his domain's safety. Mehmed had not declared a truce and he was still sending his armies against Bosnia and the Byzantine Morea. It was not until 1459, after Mehmed's conquest of Serbia, that Mehmed not only declared a truce, but also a three-year ceasefire with Skanderbeg. This gave Skanderbeg his opportunity to send his men to Italy.

Due to fears of an approaching Ottoman army, Skanderbeg first sent his nephew, Constantine, with 500 cavalry to Barletta. They were incorporated into Ferdinand's forces to combat his Angevin rivals. They held back their enemy for a year, but did not gain much ground until Skanderbeg arrived in September 1461. Before reaching Italy, Skanderbeg visited Ragusa (Dubrovnik) to convince its rectors to help fund his campaign. Meanwhile, his men landed in Italy and Angevin forces lifted their siege on Barletta. Upon arriving, Skanderbeg continued to pursue his ally's enemies with great success. Ferdinand's adversaries thus began to retreat from his territories and Skanderbeg went back to Albania; a troop of his men stayed until Ferdinand managed to finally defeat the pretenders to his throne at the Battle of Orsara, although it is not known if Skanderbeg's men participated.

== Background ==
In 1456, Skanderbeg's ally, Janos Hunyadi, died, and his son, Matthias Corvinus, was crowned King of Hungary. Hunyadi had been an advocate for an offensive war against the Ottoman Empire, whereas the Hungarian nobility and his son promoted a defensive war. The next year, however, Skanderbeg defeated a sizable Ottoman force at the Battle of Albulena (Ujëbardha). Rome had been desperately waiting for such a victory after the Siege of Belgrade, as Pope Calixtus III had wanted to assure himself of the feasibility of a crusade before declaring one. Calixtus thus named Skanderbeg the Captain-General of the Curia; to secure the pope's interests, Skanderbeg sent twelve Turkish prisoners of war that had been captured at Albulena to Rome. Despite seeing his forces defeated the year before, Sultan Mehmed II prepared another force to be sent into Albania. The country had been obstructing his ambitions for empire in the West and he grew restless to defeat Skanderbeg. Skanderbeg sent delegations to several Western European states to convince them to stop fighting each other and unite for Calixtus' crusade.

=== Italian situation ===
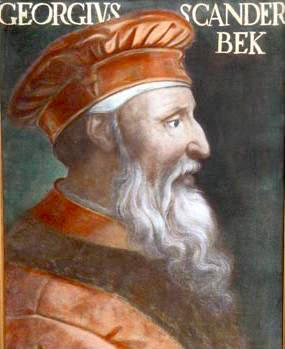
Portrait of Skanderbeg in the Uffizi, Florence

On 27 June 1458, Alfonso V of Aragon, Skanderbeg's most important and helpful ally after the stipulation of the Treaty of Gaeta, died. In 1448, as a gesture of friendship with Alfonso, Skanderbeg sent a detachment of Albanian troops commanded by General Demetrios Reres to Crotone to quell a rebellion against Alfonso. The next year, many of these men were allowed to settle four villages in Sicily which Alfonso controlled. Upon hearing of his ally's death, Skanderbeg sent emissaries to the new King of Naples, Ferdinand I, to give condolence for his father's death, but also to congratulate him on his accession to the throne of Naples. The succession was not without turbulence, however: René d'Anjou laid claim to the throne since his family had controlled Naples before Aragon had taken control of it, and also because Ferdinand was Alfonso's illegitimate son. The Southern Italian nobility, many of Angevin background, supported René d'Anjou over the Aragonese Ferdinand. Among them was Giovanni Antonio del Balzo Orsini, the Prince of Taranto, and Jacopo Piccinino, a famed condottieri who had been invited by the Angevins. Francisco Sforza, the Duke of Milan, who was wary of a French presence in Italy, sided with Ferdinand and sent his nephew, Alessandro Sforza, to command his army in southern Italy. Pope Calixtus, a Spaniard who wished to see his compatriot in control of Naples, was in no position to help the weak Ferdinand, so he turned to Skanderbeg for help. However, by that time, Piccinino and his men had conquered all of southern Italy except Naples, Capua, Aversa, Gaeta, Troia, and Barletta, where Ferdinand was besieged.

Skanderbeg had received much aid from Ferdinand's father, Alfonso, and was still a vassal of the Crown of Aragon, so he felt the need to repay the Crown. He accepted the pope's pleas to go to Italy and aid Ferdinand. Skanderbeg's stated reasoning was two-fold: he wanted to remain loyal to his ally and he wanted to prevent an Angevin takeover of Naples since they had maintained friendly relations with the Turks. Skanderbeg also feared that if the Angevins took Naples, they would turn to Albania where they had previously maintained a kingdom. On the other hand, before undertaking any action against the Angevins, he took measures to soften relations with Venice. Seeing that Southern Italy was locked in conflict, Venice no longer feared an Aragonese-Albanian alliance and the Senate decided to take a friendlier approach in Albanian-Venetian relations. Meanwhile, Pope Calixtus III had died and was succeeded by Pope Pius II. Sensing that war would soon begin, Pius tried to convince Giovanni Orsini, Ferdinand's main rival, to settle his differences with the King. The French King, Louis XI, took up the Angevin stance and, in the hopes of convincing Pius to allow the French takeover of Naples, proposed the repeal of the Pragmatic Sanction of Bourges which undermined the pope's power and he even declared that he would be willing to lend 70,000 men for the planned papal crusade. Pius, however, was wary of insincerity and disregarded these proposals. A further effort to deter Skanderbeg's landing was made by Sigismondo Malatesta, the Lord of Rimini and Italy's most feared petty tyrant, who had tried to invite Mehmed to Italy with a detailed map of the Adriatic if Ferdinand sent for the Albanian. The manuscript, however, never reached the sultan and fell into Pius' hands.

=== Albanian situation ===
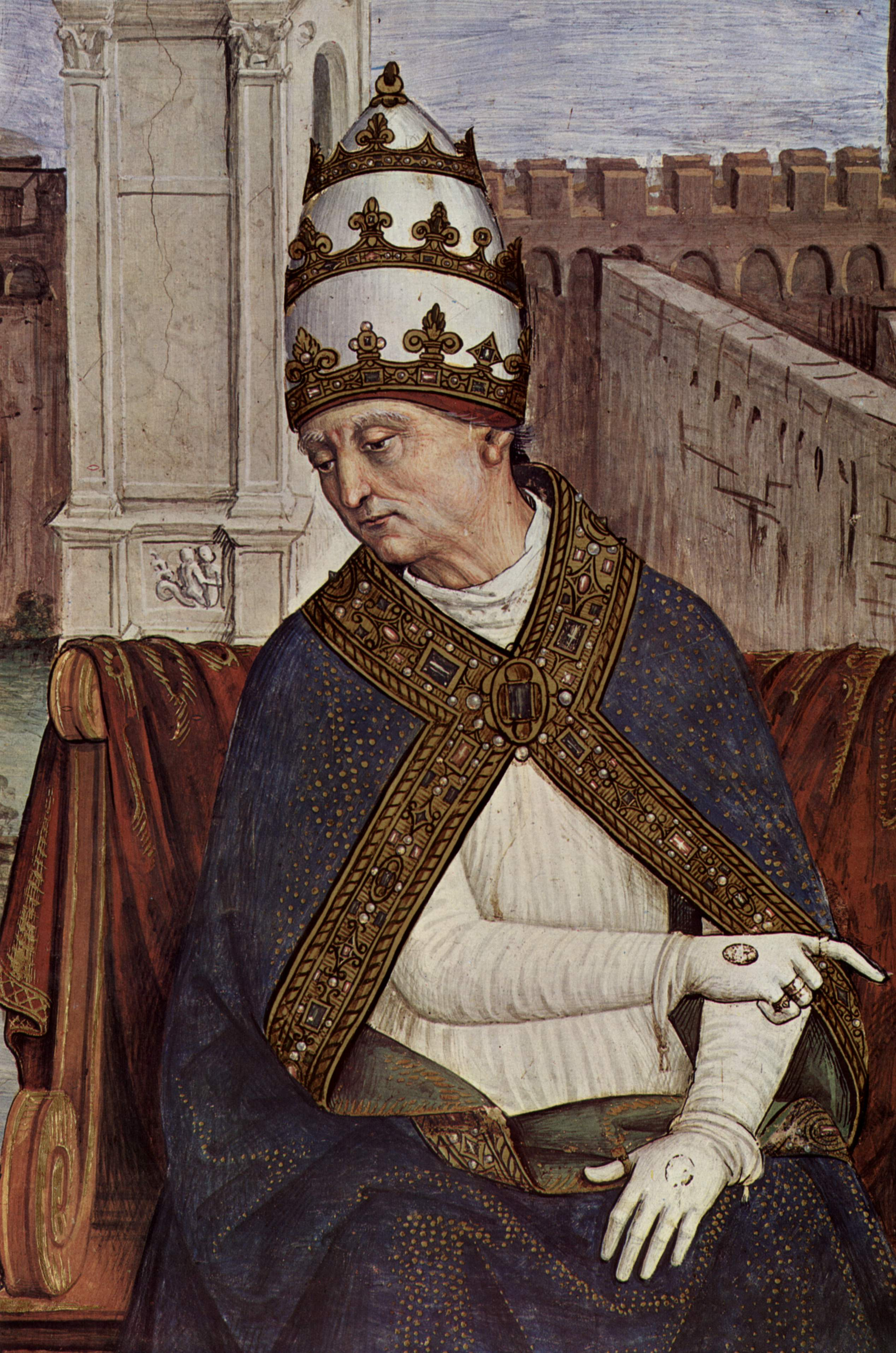
Pius II: fresco located in the 'Piccolomini library' in the Duomo of Siena

Constant news of Ottoman campaigns against Bosnia and Byzantine Morea but not against Albania seemed to suggest to Skanderbeg that Mehmed II had been considering an armistice with Skanderbeg. The latter took advantage of this lull in the fighting by preparing for his voyage to Italy and by securing his northern frontiers from a possible attack by Skanderbeg's elusive ally in northern Albania, Lekë Dukagjini, who had been trying to expand his realm by reaching an agreement with the Turks. In order to curb his ambitions, Skanderbeg seized Shat Fortress and presented it as a gift to Venice. Skanderbeg then established an alliance with Venice against Dukagjini, while Dukagjni was strengthening his Turkish alliance. The new pope issued a bull against Dukagjini, giving him fifteen days to break his alliance with the Ottomans and to reconcile with Skanderbeg, or be subject to interdiction; Dukagjini conceded and chose the former option. He then reestablished his alliance with Skanderbeg and Venice and accepted all of its losses.

Pius II continued to support Skanderbeg, but did not provide him as much financial aid as Calixtus had since he believed that Skanderbeg's military skill and his soldiers' aptitude for battle were enough to hold back the Turkish armies. However, the pope still considered Skanderbeg's assistance essential for his plans for an anti-Ottoman crusade. In 1459, after Mehmed II completed his conquest of Serbia, Ottoman envoys appealed for a three-year armistice between Skanderbeg's Albania and the Ottoman Empire. The sultan's purpose was to distance Skanderbeg from the pope's crusade as he believed the crusade's only hope for success was Skanderbeg. In order to give Albania a break from fifteen years of continuous Ottoman invasion, Skanderbeg considered accepting the proposal but he had to get the pope's approval. Pius did not allow such an agreement and began to doubt Skanderbeg's loyalty. As the Ottomans were operating in the Western Balkans, Pius feared that the Ottoman soldiers would break the truce and pour into Albania. In order to regain the pope's trust, Skanderbeg did not agree to the peace. Skanderbeg, nevertheless, was disappointed by Rome's response and he responded by not participating in the Council of Mantua which was held to plan the future crusade. The Council ended in failure, signifying that Skanderbeg would receive no help from the West. He thus sent ambassadors to the pope saying that he would only be willing to land in Italy if a ceasefire with the Turks were arranged, something which Rome soon allowed.

Before sending his men to Italy, Ragusa (Dubrovnik) was to receive Skanderbeg's envoy on 9 June 1460. He requested the city's support for the transport of his warriors to southern Italy over the Adriatic. Venice was not consulted since they pursued their own interests in Italy, whereas Ragusa held close economic relations with the Crown of Aragon. Meanwhile, Skanderbeg sent Martin Muzaka to Rome where he presented Pius with Skanderbeg's plans, and Pius in turn notified Ferdinand. Pius then ordered Venice to guard the Albanian coastline. Skanderbeg then decided to send a troop of his men while he remained in Albania. In mid-June 1461, Skanderbeg agreed to a ceasefire with Mehmed who used this time to finally conquer Trebizond (Trabzon) in the northeastern part of modern Turkey. The truce was agreed to last for three years.

== First landings ==
On 17 September 1460, Skanderbeg sent 500 cavalry to Barletta in Apulia under the command of his nephew, Constantine, who at the time was 22 or 23 years old. The battles for the Crown of Naples up to that point had been minor with not much more than one-thousand troops per belligerent. Ferdinand's Neapolitan army as a whole stood at 7,000 men. The addition of 500 Albanian cavalry, even though they were not cuirassed like their Italian counterparts, increased his force's effectiveness. By this time, Ferdinand had lost most of his territory, and was left with some fortresses in Apulia and the area surrounding Naples. The Angevins were swiftly approaching Naples and Ferdinand prepared a counteroffensive. He first secured what he had by putting Roberto del Balzo Orsini in command, but Orsini's incompetence held up the Neapolitan army. By this time, Skanderbeg's men had already arrived, and Ferdinand commenced his offensive. Albanian light-cavalry warfare was first noted here for its swiftness and effectiveness where they were reported to travel 30–40 miles (48–64 km) per day as opposed to the Italian cavalry which could only travel 10–12 miles (16–19 km). The Albanians were encouraged by Ferdinand to fight in their traditional manner and to raid the territory; Ferdinand informed Francisco Sforza that the Albanians had been devastating Apulia and taking whatever loot they could. These events worried the Angevins and prompted Giovanni Orsini to try to stop Skanderbeg from pouring his men into Italy. René d'Anjou had been particularly surprised by Skanderbeg's action since he believed that he had never offended the Albanian.

=== Orsini–Skanderbeg correspondence ===
"The Prince of Taranto wrote me a letter, a copy of which, and the reply I made him, I am sending to Your Majesty. I am very surprised that His Lordship should think to turn me from my intention by his brusque words, and I should like to say one thing: may God guard Your Majesty from ill and harm and danger, but however things may turn out I am the friend of virtue and not fortune."

— Skanderbeg's letter to Ferdinand I of Naples.

Giovanni Orsini was the Prince of Taranto and Ferdinand's fiercest rival. He had been, however, Alfonso's faithful ally and had developed an admiration for Skanderbeg and his campaigns in Albania. After Skanderbeg had sided with his rival, Orsini allied with the Angevins and refused to recognize Ferdinand as King of Naples. He then sent a letter to convince Skanderbeg to pull his men out of Italy arguing that Ferdinand's fortunes were hopeless, that Skanderbeg's fame would die out after his supposed debacle, and that an alliance with René would be much more rewarding than an alliance with Ferdinand. Skanderbeg's letter in response, dated to 10 October 1460, stated that he was not a condottieri looking for fortune, but a mature man looking to help his ally. Furthermore, he sent another letter to Ferdinand assuring him his loyalty. Another letter was sent to Pius assuring him that the Albanians were fit for battle in Italy, something the Italian rulers did not believe. The letters elucidate Skanderbeg's political motives behind his Italian expedition, presenting himself as a noble ally, and also illustrate the influence of the Renaissance in Skanderbeg's court. They also served a psychological purpose to intimidate Ferdinand's rivals: Skanderbeg compared himself to Pyrrhus of Epirus of antiquity who marched into Italy to defend the Greek city-states from Roman expansion.

=== Neapolitan counteroffensive ===
By October 1460, Ferdinand was able to recapture his western territories from Capua to Beneventum. In his eastern frontier, however, his enemies remained at large. The most dangerous among them was Piccinino. Piccinino had undertaken the task of blocking papal and Neapolitan troops en route to Apulia. Since Roberto Orsini, the man left in charge of the east and Giovanni Orsini's brother who had remained loyal to Ferdinand, was deemed incompetent, Ferdinand invited Constantine to Naples, offering him a leading role in an operation against Piccinino. Along with Constantine's cavalry, Francesco del Balzo, the Duke of Andria who had remained loyal to Ferdinand, managed to defeat Ercole d'Este in Gargano. They then had control over the custom-duties gathered there which brought 30,000 ducats annually from which most of Piccinino's pay came. The fighting continued for three months after which Constantine and Ferdinand were able to regain some lost territory. Piccinino prepared his own counteroffensive, along with Giovanni Orsini's men, laying siege to the main castles. A fierce battle soon erupted over Venosa on 28 May 1461 where the Albanian cavalry took part. Ferdinand abandoned the city and fled back to Apulia. Near Troia, he met Skanderbeg's ambassador, Gjokë Stres Balsha, who informed him that Skanderbeg was ready to land in Italy as soon as the proper galleys were provided.

== Skanderbeg's expedition ==
=== Preparations and Ragusan voyage ===
Before leaving for Italy, Skanderbeg needed to accumulate the appropriate finances. Pius ordered the Diocese of Dalmatia to give a third of what it had raised for the forthcoming crusade to Skanderbeg. The pope also ordered 1,000 florins to be given to Skanderbeg from the Vatican's funds. The Ragusan banks held this amount, but due to the threat of an Ottoman invasion, they refused to continue funding the crusade; Stjepan Vukčić Kosača of Duchy of Saint Sava warned that the Ottomans would soon move into Dalmatia and Albania. They were thus reluctant to fund Skanderbeg's expedition to Italy. Due to issues of finance and the lack of large ships (he had, however, received several smaller ships to transport his troops), Skanderbeg's arrival was delayed while Ferdinand was under siege in Barletta. Before the siege began, however, Ferndinand sent four galleys to the Albanian shores where Skanderbeg and his men were waiting. Skanderbeg had meanwhile sent an unnamed captain to his eastern frontiers to guard against an Ottoman attack and left his wife, Donika, in charge of his affairs.

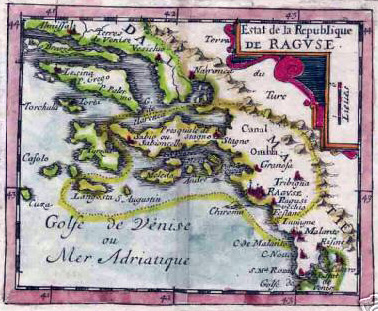
Map of the Republic of Ragusa

A Venetian ambassador on his way from Constantinople reported that Skanderbeg had assembled 1,000 cavalry and 2,000 infantry along with several papal and Neapolitan ships at Capo-di-Lachi (Albanian: Kepi i Lagjit) near modern-day Kavajë. He was still awaiting a supply of grain and two Neapolitan ships, however, so he continued to wait. On 21–22 August 1461, the four galleys sent by Ferdinand arrived. He boarded soon thereafter but he did not send his entire force directly to Apulia. He sent Ivan Strez Balšić (who had returned from Italy) with 500 cavalry and 1,000 infantry to the besieged Ferdinand, whereas Skanderbeg himself went to Ragusa to convince its rectors there to give him his needed funds. Ivan's men landed in Barletta on 24 August 1461. The Angevin forces, among whom was Giovanni Orsini, feared that Skanderbeg himself was the leader of this force, so they lifted the siege of Barletta immediately. Ivan then informed Ferdinand that Skanderbeg would arrive after his voyage to Ragusa. Ferdinand felt that Skanderbeg's personal involvement was essential and began to worry when he did not come in two days, as Ivan had promised.

Skanderbeg reached Ragusa on 24 August 1461 along with the Pal Engjëlli, the Archbishop of Durrës. His men stayed on the ships anchored in the harbor while he went into the city. Due to papal pressure, the Ragusans had reconsidered Skanderbeg's requests. His fame was visible when he walked through the city-gates and the population poured into the streets to see him. He had been greeted with a ceremony and a tour of the city inspecting its walls and weaponry. He then received the financial sum he had come for. His men were also supplied with food for their coming campaign. His popularity allowed him to be well-kept by the Ragusans where the largest Albanian community outside of Albania was present. On 29 August 1461, Skanderbeg set off for Apulia, but a storm forced him to anchor off a Dalmatian island. On 3 September 1461, Skanderbeg finally reached Barletta.

=== Skanderbeg in Italy ===
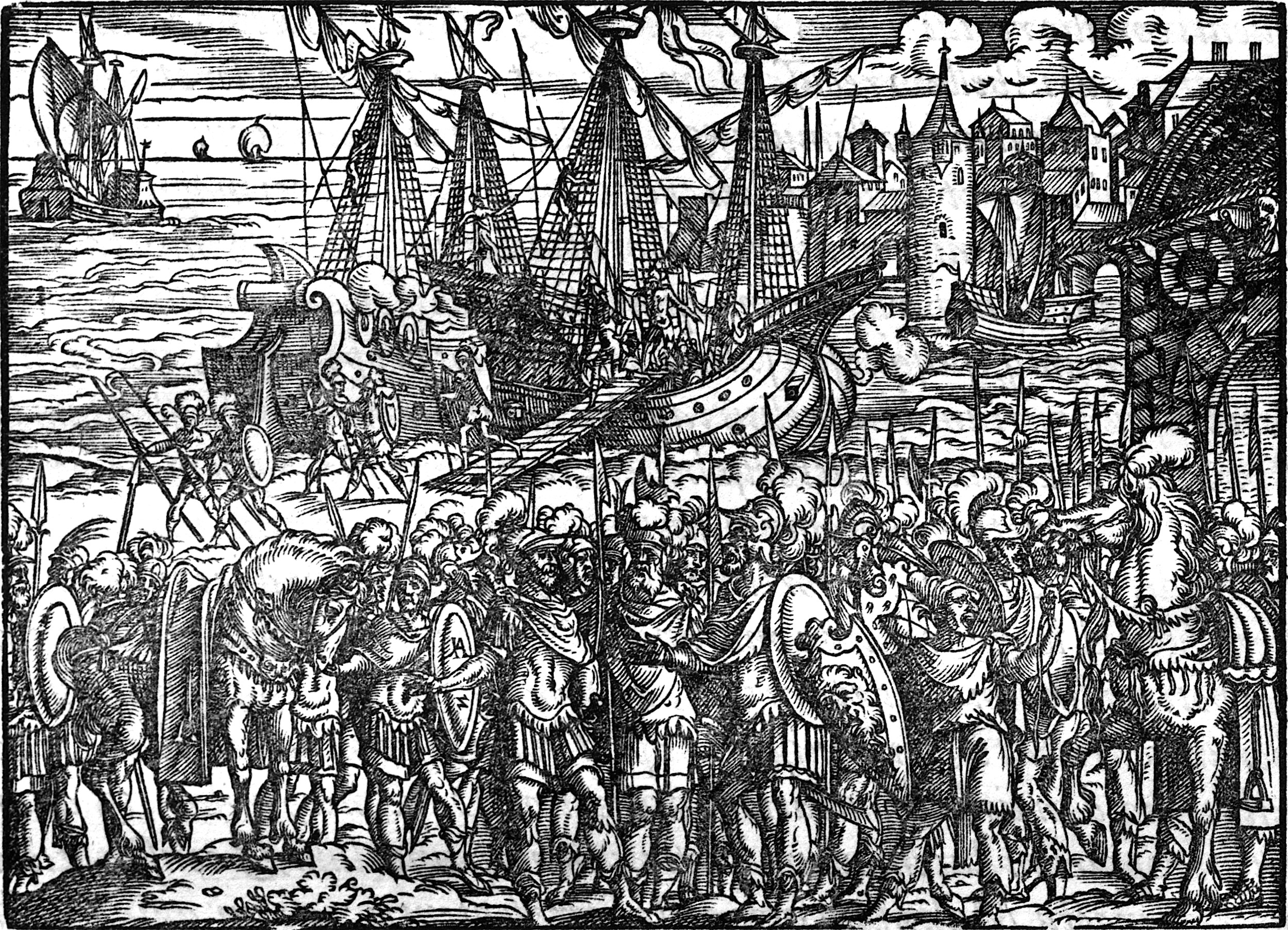
Skanderbeg disembarking in Italy - Engraving by Jost Amman 1587

==== Campaign in Barletta and Andria ====
Even though they lifted the siege of Barletta upon seeing Skanderbeg's approaching men the week before, Angevin forces remained active. Once Skanderbeg arrived, Ferdinand put him in command of the fortress of Barletta whereas the King himself went to Ariano Irpino. Once left in command of the fortress, Skanderbeg moved against Ferdinand's rivals. Among them were Giovanni Orsini, Jean d'Anjou (the Duke of Calabria), Piccinino, and Francesco del Balzo. They had stationed themselves in Andria, where the Albanian assaults continued. The Albanian cavalry's light armament, swift horses, and loose ranks allowed them to quickly overcome the 7,000 heavily armed Italian cavalry, which fought in tight formations. In one of their operations, an Albanian warrior captured Alois Minutulo, the lord of the Castle of Monte Sant'Angelo who was imprisoned in the Fortress of Barletta. Three years later, Ferdinand would present Skanderbeg with the castle as a token of his gratitude.

Ferdinand's opponents, under Piccinino's main command, tried to open battle with Skanderbeg, but due to the combined strength of Albanian and Neapolitan forces, they withdrew from the Andrian fields to Acquaviva delle Fonti. News of Piccinino's retreat reached Venice who sent a message to Francisco Sforza. Skanderbeg then marched to Taranto, where Giovanni Orsini was prince. Orsini tried again to dissuade Skanderbeg from marching against him, but Ferdinand was wary of Orsini's faithfulness, so Skanderbeg continued raiding Orsini's territory. He split his army into three parts, one under Moisi Arianit Golemi, the other under Vladan Gjurica, and the last under his command. He led attacks against Ferdinand's enemies in three directions without halt, thoroughly exhausting them. During the month of October, Skanderbeg continued to pillage Orisini's territory from his bases at Barletta and Andria since the Angevins were not present; Ferdinand meanwhile mopped up in Calabria, where he recaptured Cosenza and Castrovillari. At this point, Orsini asked Skanderbeg for a truce which the Albanian rejected. On 27 October, Skanderbeg reported that he had captured the town of Gisualdo. Piccinino then asked Skanderbeg to discontinue his campaign which Skanderbeg exuberantly accepted, believing that peace was near.

The Castle of Monte Sant'Angelo in an early 20th-century photograph

Piccinino, however, did not seek to maintain the agreement as one of his deserters reported. Upon learning this, Skanderbeg decided to open battle with Piccinino's men.

==== Battle of Seggiano ====
After feeding his men and preparing his horses, Skanderbeg set off by moonlight for the Angevin camp. He found the place empty, however, since one of Piccinino's men had already informed Piccinino on the Albanians' intentions. Skanderbeg then returned to Barletta where he was reinforced by Ferdinand and his men. He then split his army into two, one under Alessandro Sforza's command, the other under his, and he approached Troia. Jean d'Anjou and Piccinino were stationed in Lucera, however, eight miles from Troia. Knowing that battle would come between Troia and Lucera, Skanderbeg set out by night to capture Seggiano, a mountain lying between the two cities, where he stationed some of his men to protect it. Thence, his men could find refuge in case of defeat. Piccinino had the same objective in mind and set out to capture the mountain, but instead met Skanderbeg's men. He thus kept his men in order for the coming battle. The next day, the two armies met. The battle lasted until dusk, but Jean's men suffered a serious defeat and he was forced to flee. Piccinino then retreated from his campaigns. He went northwards where he joined Sigismondo Malatesta and 200 of his men to launch assaults on the papal state.

==== Capture of Trani ====
Skanderbeg's next task was to recapture Trani, the second most important point in Apulia, aside from Barletta. He succeeded in capturing the commander of the garrison, Fuscia de Foxa, who had rebelled against Ferdinand. Fuscia was outside the walls of Trani with sixteen men when Skanderbeg saw him and surrounded him and then tried to convince him to abandon Orsini, whereby Fuscia refused for pecuniary reasons. On the morning of 28 December 1461, with Fuscia's pleas, Gracciani, the vice-commander of the garrison, surrendered Trani. Both Fuscia and Gracciani, however, refused to hand over the garrison's munitions. Skanderbeg threatened to imprison them if they did not surrender what they were asked to, forcing the two to hand over Trani's stores. After weeks of marauding, Skanderbeg and his Aragonese colleagues joined Alessandro Sforza's men. They then yielded all of the fortresses that they had recaptured to Ferdinand.

== Aftermath ==
Seeing that their fortunes were dwindling, Ferdinand's rivals tried to settle for peace with Francisco Sforza. Ferdinand sent Skanderbeg as an intermediary where Giovanni Orsini and Piccinino offered peace if paid 150,000 and 110,000 ducats respectively, something that Ferdinand refused. This was one of Skanderbeg's last personal actions in Italy. He stayed in Apulia for another month until January 1462 when he returned to Albania, leaving his soldiers in Italy. His reason for leaving Italy is not clear, but it is believed that at that time Mehmed was preparing his campaign against Hungary, something which could be turned against Albania. On his return route, he again visited Ragusa, where he was likewise welcomed as a hero. He wanted to set off for Albania immediately, but bad weather forced him to stay. He was offered supplies by the Ragusan Rectors, suggesting that he wished to continue to Albania via land, but instead, after ten days in Ragusa, he sailed by ship to Albania. Before leaving, he purchased grain from Sicily for his soldiers in Apulia.

The war over the Crown of Naples continued for several more months after Skanderbeg left. It is not known if Albanian warriors fought in the ensuing battles. In August 1462, Ferdinand achieved a decisive victory at Orsara. Skanderbeg's expedition made him famous throughout Italy. In his book, De Bello Neapolitano (English: The Neapolitan War), Iovianus Pontanus sees the Albanian landing as essential to Ferdinand's victory: their quick maneuvering and swift assaults virtually immobilized the Italian warriors. Skanderbeg's expedition succeeded in lifting the Siege of Barletta, capturing Trani through a ruse, forcing the Angevins to turn from an offensive to a defensive strategy, and devastating the land to the point where its inhabitants and Giovanni Orsini were forced to submit to Ferdinand, even allowing Ferdinand to safely attend the wedding of Antonio Piccolomini, Pius II's nephew. Moreover, the campaign was instrumental in securing the Neapolitan kingdom for Ferdinand.

For his services, Ferdinand awarded Monte Sant'Angelo to Skanderbeg where many of his men soon settled. They settled fifteen villages in the rolling landscapes to the east of Taranto. His return to Albania was greeted as a triumph by his followers. Despite the jubilation, however, Skanderbeg began to prepare for war. On 7 July 1462, the Turkish army resumed its campaigns in Albania. The first major engagement was at Mokra on 7 July 1462. In the following Macedonian campaign in August of the same year, Skanderbeg defeated three Ottoman armies in one month. On 27 April 1463, Skanderbeg and Mehmed signed a new peace treaty, but later, on 9 September 1463, Skanderbeg signed an alliance with Venice which had been preparing for war against the Ottomans. On 12 October 1463, Pius grew confident enough to declare his crusade against the Ottoman Turks which Skanderbeg joined.

== See also ==
- Mehmed II's first Albanian campaign
- Wars in Lombardy
- Ottoman-Venetian War (1463–1479)
- Italian Wars
