= Rodoni =

Rodoni may refer to:

- Cape of Rodon, in Albania
- Castle of Rodon, in Albania
