= Georgius Pelino =

Albanian Catholic priest

- Born: Novo Brdo, Serbian Despotate
- Died: 1463
- Other names: See list
- Occupation(s): abbot, businessman, diplomat

Georgius Pelino or Gjergj Pelini (fl. 1438–1463) was an Albanian Catholic priest, the abbot of Ratac Abbey and diplomat of Skanderbeg and Venetian Republic.

== Life ==
Pelino's birthdate is unknown, but his birthplace Novo Brdo is stated in a 1441 document. From 1438 (or 1436) to 1463, he was the abbot of Ratac Abbey in nowadays Sutomore. His abbey was under the jurisdiction of the Roman Catholic Archdiocese of Bar, but he was not in good relations with its titulars, due to his ambitions to become himself head of Archdiocese. Many sources mention pharmacist Antonije Beli as Pelino's assistant.

=== Citizen of the Serbian Despotate ===
In 1421 Pelino borrowed 1,505 perpers to Balsha III when the latter decided to travel to visit Stefan Lazarević. Later, on 15 March 1445, Pelino requested from the Venetian Senate to authorize him to claim this amount from the heritage property of Jelena Lazarević. Jelena Lazarević also borrowed 205 ducats from Ratac Abbey and in 1446 Pelino added this amount to his claim, promising to forgive a half of it.

The Treaty of Vushtrri, signed in Vushtrri on 22 April 1426 between Republic of Venice and Serbian Despotate, formally ended the Second Scutari War. By this treaty Venice ceded Ratac to the Serbian Despotate. Ratac was included into the list of Serbian demands probably based on the pressure of the people from Bar on Serbian negotiators. Stefan Lazarević confirmed the privileges of Ratac Abbey initially granted by the King Milutin. To negotiate this confirmation Pelino traveled to meet Lazarević in his court. In 1438 he traveled to Dubrovnik as ambassador of despot Đurađ Branković.

In 1441, together with Gjon Gazulli he is mentioned as a member of a diplomatic mission in Italy. In Autumn 1442 Pelino was expelled from Ratac Abbey by Stephen Vukčić for seven months period. Vukčić put a price on Pelino's head. During this period Pelino appealed to the Venetian Senate to support his appointment on the position of archbishop of Archdiocese of Bar. Venetian Senate promised that it would negotiate with the Pope to appoint Pelino on some vacant position of archbishop or some other position in the church hierarchy. In the meantime the Senate granted Pelino 10 monthly provisions paid from the treasury of Kotor.

=== Citizen of the Venetian Republic ===
The years-long dispute between Pelino and Marin Adamović, a jeweler from Kotor, was ended in 1444. At the beginning of 1445 archbishop of Bar complained to the Venetians about Pelino. This was a beginning of Pelino's long struggle with Bar archbishops and governors to keep privileges his abbey had within Serbian Despotate.

Together with Andrea, the Bishop of Arbër, Pelino participated as a negotiator between Skanderbeg and Venice Republic during the peace treaty negotiations that ended Albanian–Venetian War of 1447–1448.

In 1448 Pelino was expelled from Ratac Abbey for the second time. In this case by Venetian governor of Bar, Jakov Delfino who also, in the name of all Bar clergy, wrote a letter to pope complaining against Pelino.

Pelino often borrowed money to Venetians. In 1450 Pelino borrowed 1,508 perpers to Venetian Republic. In 1451 he again borrowed substantial amount to Venetians.

While Venice proveditors of Scutari and Durazzo were helping the Ottoman army during the First Siege of Krujë, as a representative of Skanderbeg, in October 1450 he proposed to the Venice to cede them a sovereignty over the city of Krujë. On November 1450 Venice informed him that his request was not accepted, because it had not enough soldiers to do so. In period 1453-56 Pelino was appointed as Protonotary apostolic and wrote Skanderbeg's charters. Mainly due to Pelino's efforts the peace treaty privileges and payment conditions were renewed in 1456.

Based on the privileges granted to Ratac Abbey by Serbian Nemanjić dynasty, Pelino complained to Venetian Senate when governors of Bar starting from 1456 insisted that Ratac should pay tax of one tenth of its income from vine and olive oil. In July 1457 Pelino complained to Venetians that Paštrovići still control four villages conquered during campaign of Altomanović. In 1458 Ratac was finally completely released from the obligations to pay one tenth of its income to Bar and thanks to Pelino's efforts four villages controlled by Paštrovići were returned under control of Ratac Abbey.

In June 1457 Pelino brought Skanderbeg's letter to Venetians. In this letter Skanderbeg complained because Venetians irregularly paying him agreed provisions. Later, in the same year, in the name of Skanderbeg Pelino went in a diplomatic mission to Pope Callixtus III and convinced him to continue to pay allowances to Skanderbeg.

In 1458 during the conflict between Skanderbeg and Lekë Dukagjini, he acted as an intermediary between Skanderbeg and Venice, achieving a personal success in forging the bases for a future military alliance between them. In a sign of good will, in 1459 Skanderbeg handed over to Venice the castle of Sati, that he had captured from Lekë Dukagjini that year. Pleased by this act, Venice rewarded Pelino's brothers with a monthly pension. In 1460 Skanderbeg appointed him as his personal ambassador. When Venetian Republic stopped paying provisions to Skanderbeg in 1462 Pelino managed to convince Venetian Senate to continue payment of the provisions of 600 ducats per year and to pay all retained provisions. For his success in negotiations with Skanderbeg Pelino was paid by the Venetians, so he was not only Skanderbeg's diplomat in Venice but also Venice's diplomat at Skanderbeg and actually a mediator between two parties. In 1463 he played an important role in the signing of an alliance treaty between Skanderbeg and the Republic of Venice. On 20 October 1463 Pelino was mentioned for the last time in documents, as Skanderbeg's envoy in Venice. Taking in consideration that on 13 December 1463 Pal Gazulli was again mentioned as Skanderbeg's envoy in Venice, it is assumed that Pelino died in this period.

== Annotations ==
1. In Latin, his name was spelled Georgius Pelino, Georgius Pelini, Georgius Pelinus, Georgius Pellinouich, and Georgii Pelinovich. In Serbian, his name is rendered as Georgije Pelinović (Георгије Пелиновић), Đorđe Pelinović (Ђорђе Пелиновић), and Đurđe Pelinović. The Albanian version of his name is Gjergj Pelini. He was also known by his byname "de Novomonte".

== Sources ==
- Spremić, Momčilo (1964). Zbornik Filozofskog fakulteta (in Serbian). Naučno delo. pp. 198, 203–205, 211–213, 441. ".... дум Ђорђем Пелиновићем, из Новог Брда, економом манастира св. Марије ратачке код Бара."
- Marković, Savo (2004). "Benediktinska opatija svete Marije Ratačke kod Bara, Acta diplomatica et iuridica". Croatica Christiana Periodica. 28 (53).
