= Pal Gazuli =

Albanian priest, scholar and diplomat

Pal Gazuli or Paulus Gassulus (1405–1470) was an Albanian Catholic priest, scholar and diplomat under Skanderbeg service. After the death of Georgius Pelino in 1463, he became the personal ambassador of Skanderbeg in Republic of Venice. On 13 December 1463 he represented Skanderbeg at the Venetian Senate. His brother Gjon was also a diplomat of the League of Lezhë.
