= Second Battle of Mokra (1462) =

Part of the Albanian–Ottoman Wars

Second Battle of Mokra Beteja e dytë e Mokrës
- Part of the Albanian–Ottoman Wars (1432–1479)
Date	7 July 1462
Location	Mokra (today in Makedonski Brod, North Macedonia)
Result	Albanian victory

Belligerents
League of Lezhë	Ottoman Empire

Commanders and leaders
Skanderbeg	Sinan bey

Strength
8,000	Unknown

Casualties and losses
Unknown	Unknown

The Second Battle of Mokra (Albanian: Beteja e dytë e Mokrës) took place on 7 July 1462, just before Skanderbeg's Macedonian campaign. Sultan Mehmed II had emerged victorious from his recent campaigns, adding large tracts of land to his empire. He was confident enough to send a new force into Albania to weaken the Albanian forces. So he sent an army under Sinan bey to complete the task. Skanderbeg was prepared and moved towards the Albanian border. The armies came close to Mokra, where Skanderbeg had positioned his forces on a mountain dominating the landscape. When the Ottoman forces got close enough, the Albanians ambushed them and they were routed. Skanderbeg then plundered the region, sharing the spoils with his men.

== Background ==
During 1460–1462, Skanderbeg had campaigned in Italy for Ferdinand, the king of Naples, many of whose nobles supported an invasion by John d'Anjou, the duke of Lorraine. Skanderbeg's support was crucial, and he led the forces that finally crushed d'Anjou at the battle of Troia on 18 August 1462. Meanwhile, Mehmed had finally conquered the Peloponnese and Trebizond. When he learned of Skanderbeg's presence in Italy, he sent an invasion force to Albania. Skanderbeg's wife Donika sent an urgent letter to Skanderbeg, asking him to return to Albania. Skanderbeg realised that he was needed at home, so he left Ferdinand to deal with the greatly weakened Angevin forces, and boarded himself and his men for Albania.

== Battle ==
The Sultan sent thousands of cavalry under Sinan bey to fight the Albanian forces. Skanderbeg quickly assembled his army. With great caution, he took the same road the Ottomans would use and positioned his men on a mountain in the Mokra valley, where the Ottomans were expected to pass. When the Ottomans arrived, Skanderbeg ordered his men to move forward, beating their drums and swords together to give the impression of a very large Albanian force. The Ottoman forces withdrew in disarray and the Albanians continued to pursue them, inflicting many casualties and taking many prisoners.

== Aftermath ==
Skanderbeg pursued the Ottoman forces into Macedonia. With the main Ottoman force in the region already defeated, Skanderbeg continued to raid Macedonia. When he returned to Albania, he shared the spoils with his men. Mehmed was angered by the defeat and the following month he sent three separate Turkish armies into Macedonia in preparation for an invasion of Albania. Skanderbeg instead launched his own invasion, defeating each of the three armies before they set foot in Albania.

== Bibliography ==
- Francione, Gennaro (2006) [2003]. Aliaj, Donika (ed.). Skënderbeu, një hero modern : (Hero multimedial) [Skanderbeg, a modern hero (Hero multimedia)] (in Albanian). Translated by Tasim Aliaj. Tiranë, Albania: Shtëpia botuese "Naim Frashëri". ISBN 99927-38-75-8.
- Franco, Demetrio. Comentario de le cose de' Turchi, et del S. Georgio Scanderbeg, principe d' Epyr. Venice: Altobello Salkato, 1480.
