= Gjon Gazuli =

Albanian friar, scholar and diplomat

The Reverend Gjon Gazuli OP
- Born: 1400
- Died: 19 February 1465 (aged 64–65); Dubrovnik, Republic of Ragusa
- Occupations: Friar, writer, diplomat
- Relatives: Pal Gazuli (1405–1470) - Brother, Andrea Gazuli (Brother)
- Writing career
- Movement: Humanist

Gjon Gazuli, OP (Latin: Johannes Gasulus, Croatian: Ivan Gazulić)^{[a]}^{[b]} was a Dominican friar, humanist scholar, astronomer and diplomat from the Republic of Ragusa of Albanian origin.

== Name ==
He is known in Albanian as Gjon Gjin Gazuli, or even Gjin Gazulli. In Croatian he is known as Ivan Gazulić, Ivan Gazul and Ivan Gazoli Not to be confused with Dom Gjon Gazulli, an Albanian Catholic Cleric, executed by Ahmet Zogu's regime in 1927.

== Life ==
Gazuli attended schools in Shkodër and Dubrovnik, and in 1430 he graduated from the University of Padua. He lived and worked in Dominican Friary in Dubrovnik. In 1432 he traveled to the Hungarian royal court where he attempted to persuade Sigismund I to support Albanian resistance against the Ottoman Empire. He broke his mission off in 1433, when he was appealed to be a professor of mathematics and astronomy at the University of Padua. Years later he was acting as a diplomat with the Italian principalities' courts, representing the interests of Skanderbeg and of the League of Lezhë.

His lasting mathematical and astronomical works were written in Latin. He had a reputation for considerable knowledge in Italy and in Hungary, as well. His brother, Pal Gazuli (1405–1470), was the diplomat of Skanderbeg and of the League of Lezhë in Ragusa. He had a second brother named Andrea Gazuli, also mentioned as prominent.

== Sources ==
- Frashëri, Kristo (2002), Gjergj Kastrioti Skënderbeu: jeta dhe vepra, 1405–1468 (in Albanian), Botimet Toena, ISBN 99927-1-627-4
- Schmitt, Oliver Jens (2001), Das venezianische Albanien (1392-1479), Oldenbourg Wissenschaftsverlag, ISBN 978-3-486-56569-0
