= Ottoman invasion of Albania in 1452 =

1452 Ottoman military campaign

Ottoman invasion of Albania of 1452 Fushata shqiptare e Mehmetit II
- Part of the Albanian–Ottoman Wars (1432–1479)
Date	21 July 1452
Location	eastern Albania
Result	Albanian victory

Belligerents
League of Lezhë	Ottoman Empire

Commanders and leaders
Skanderbeg	Tahip Pasha †; Hamza Pasha (POW)

Strength
14,000	25,000–27,000

Casualties and losses
1,000 dead or wounded	7,000 dead or wounded

The Ottoman invasion of Albania in 1452 (Albanian: Fushata shqiptare e Mehmetit II) was a campaign by the newly acceded Ottoman sultan Mehmed II against Skanderbeg, the chief of the League of Lezhë. Shortly after the first siege of Krujë, Murad II died in Edirne, and was succeeded by his son Mehmed II. Mehmed ordered nearly annual invasions of Albania which often resulted in multiple battles in one year. The first of these expeditions was sent in 1452 under the dual command of Hamza Pasha and Tahip Pasha, with an army of approximately 25,000 men.

Albania at the time was suffering a crisis of power as Skanderbeg, the chief of the League of Lezhë, became a vassal of Alfonso the Magnanimous, the king of Aragon. Worried about another growing adversary in the Venetian Gulf, the Republic of Venice tried to turn Skanderbeg's allies against him in order to weaken Alfonso's influence. Realizing his opportunity, Mehmed ordered an invasion of Albania. Skanderbeg, knowing the impetuous nature of the new sultan and the effect it would have if his army were not immediately defeated, acted quickly. When the Ottoman army split into two separate forces, Skanderbeg attacked and defeated both Hamza and Tahip. Tahip was killed in battle and Hamza was captured and ransomed for 13,000 ducats along with his staff. Soon thereafter, Skanderbeg cajoled his former Venetian adversaries into easing Albanian-Venetic relations.

== Albanian relations with the west ==
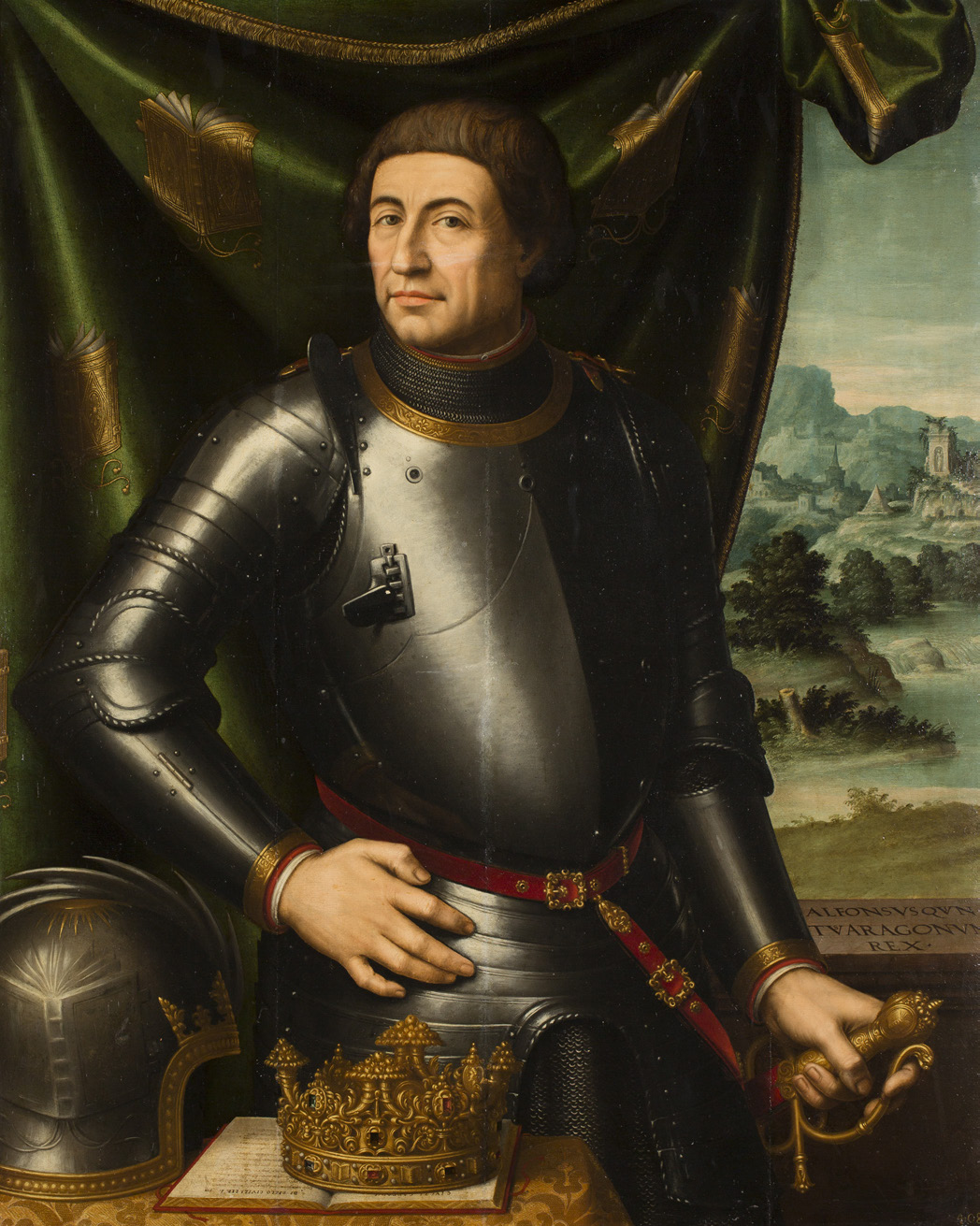
Alfonso V of Aragon by Juan de Juanes.

The siege of Krujë in 1450 resulted in heavy losses for both Murad II and the League of Lezhë. A large portion of Albanian territory laid waste by the long campaign where the Turkish forces had been stationed for more than half a year. The country was left with few resources to produce crops and a large famine was the result.

In 1451, the year after Murad's forces had devastated the country, Mehmed II gained control of the Ottoman Empire following his father's death. Mehmed's great energy was already apparent during the previous years when he had accompanied his father to Albania. Skanderbeg realized that if Mehmed struck now, he would be in great difficulty since he lacked the resources and the support to successfully hold off a large invasion. One of Albania's most powerful princedoms, the Dukagjini, were in open negotiations with the Turks, suggesting that they would become Mehmed's vassals.

With an internal conflict, a destroyed economy, and a weakened army, Skanderbeg realized that he needed to make an alliance with a powerful state so that the league would continue its existence. He first approached the Republic of Venice, offering a military alliance and a sort of vassalhood to the Republic of Venice, The republic was then enjoying good relations with the Ottomans and thus refused Skanderbeg's offer. Rome offered some monetary help, but Skanderbeg was looking for more. Skanderbeg then turned to Alfonso V of Aragon who then controlled Naples and Sicily. Alfonso wanted to expand his empire from Gibraltar to the Bosphorus. In order to realize his dreams, he would need a bridgehead in the Balkans from where he could march to Constantinople. Alfonso thus took up the offer to establish diplomatic relations with Skanderbeg and his Albanian allies.

The Neapolitan nobles distrusted Skanderbeg since the Kastrioti family had previously been allied with Venice. Alfonso himself had been offended when he asked Skanderbeg to attack Venice along with Đurađ Branković and the Albanian refused. Alfonso was also a devout Christian and found it uneasy to ally with Skanderbeg who had previously practiced Islam in the Ottoman court. On the other hand, Skanderbeg had been disillusioned when Alfonso failed to send any troops to Krujë when they were most needed. But things changed once Skanderbeg had thwarted the Ottoman Army. Both Venice and Alfonso grew an interest in expanding their powers in the Adriatic and the Ionian. On 26 March 1451, the Treaty of Gaeta was signed, creating an Albanian-Aragonese alliance.

Skanderbeg also sent diplomats to other Italian states. In August 1451, along with Venice he sent messages to Francesco Sforza, then duke of Milan, and Siena to inform them of his victory over the Turks and of the desperate need for supplies to continue combating the Ottoman armies, but no aid was received. Venice responded that she wished to see the Albanians and the Turks settle for peace, whereas Sforza's response hinged upon the excuse that his state was not financially sound and that his soldiers were not meant to help an Albanian prince. Only Ragusa offered a large amount of ducats.

== Conflict over control of Albania ==
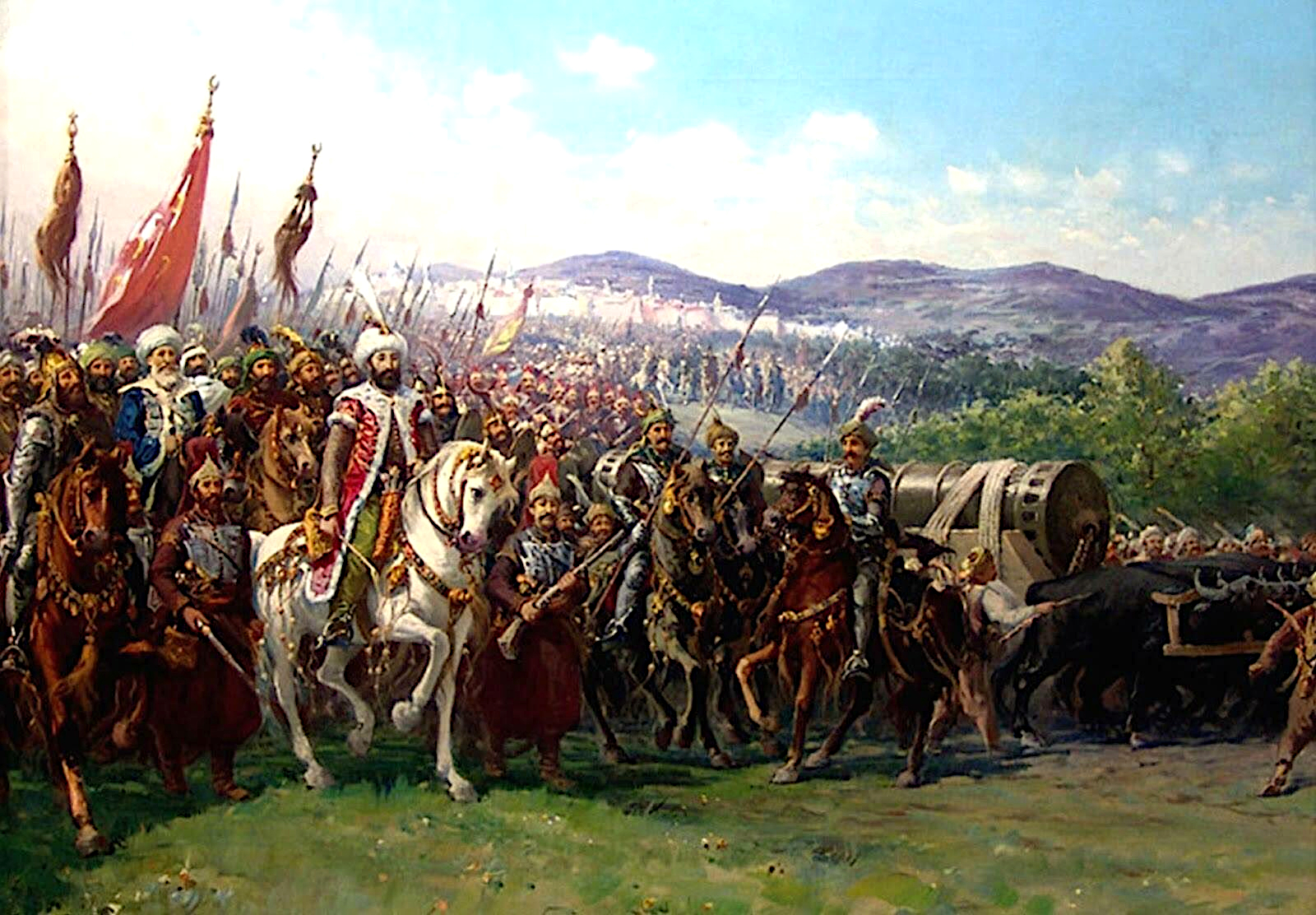
Mehmed II outside of Constantinople.

Skanderbeg's primary reason for allying with Alfonso was his fear of 21-year-old Mehmed II, whose ambition was to reconquer Justinian I's empire which stretched from Syria to Spain. Mehmed had been planning a campaign against Albania since Skanderbeg had defeated his father at Krujë in 1450. Another factor was that Krujë geographically dominated Durazzo, which was only 150 kilometers from Brindisi, the nearest Italian port. Mehmed's ambitions were symmetrical to Alfonso's and it was clear that there would be some sort of clash between the two in Albania, the epicenter of the conflict. Mehmed was one of the first monarchs since Roman times to keep a massive centralized army under his personal control. Besides controlling a huge army, Mehmed was widely acknowledged for his far-reaching wisdom which allowed him to produce a highly advanced military armed with the newest models of the cannon.

The strength of the Albanian resistance was supposed to be fierce, but Alfonso wanted to see the league become powerful enough to seriously challenge the Ottoman Empire, much unlike the Venetians who were troubled by the growing Albanian state. In May, Alfonso sent two experienced Catalan officers with 200 men and plenty of supplies to Krujë and, on 7 June 1451, he established an alliance with George Arianiti, the most powerful League member from southern Albania. Later that same year, Alfonso created similar alliances with John Musachi, George Stres Balsha, Muzaka Thopia, Peter Himariot, and Simon Zenevishi, all important Albanian nobles allied to Skanderbeg. Skanderbeg was pleased with Alfonso, but dissension in the League over political issues was still present. Paul Dukagjini and Peter Spani remained aligned with Venice and established friendly relations with the sultan.

In 1451, Mehmed was focused on defeating the Karamanids and Menteşe in the east, but it was in his intentions to return to Albania. During this brief period of rest, Skanderbeg took up the rebuilding of Krujë and erected a new fortress in Modrica in the Drin valley near Svetigrad (which had been lost in a 1448 siege) where Turkish forces had previously slipped through unhindered. The fortress was constructed in the heat of summer within a few months when few Turkish posts were present. This came as a huge blow to Ottoman efforts whose Albanian operations were thus inhibited.

Meanwhile, the Venetian cities had been trying to antagonize Skanderbeg's allies against him in order to halt Aragonese expansion into the eastern Mediterranean. In response, Alfonso sent Bernard Vaquer to be the governor of Krujë, only to be replaced later by Ramon d'Ortafà, whereas the commander of the garrison was Pedro Scuder with 100 men. Alfonso thus became the nominal ruler of Albania, although Skanderbeg's men made up the dominant majority of the anti-Ottoman forces, leaving Skanderbeg in virtual command of Albania. Venice continued its efforts to turn Skanderbeg's allies against Alfonso and Skanderbeg. George Arianiti resisted the Venetian plots and even cut himself off from Albanian politics. Paul Dukagjini, however, prepared for war against Skanderbeg.

To the north, Stefan Crnojević did not keep relations with Alfonso. Instead, he allied himself with Venice which gave him the Flag of St. Marc to bear. Crnojević thus became a Venetian vassal, who promised to protect Albania Veneta from Serbian and Turkish attacks. Skanderbeg grew agitated from the Venetian subtleties and threatened a renewed war against Venice under the pretext that the Senate had not been annually paying the 1,400 ducats promised to the Albanian in 1448. He had already moved his men towards Durazzo and Scutari, leaving the Republic with no choice but to ease their secretive diplomacy.

== War in the east ==
In 1452, Turkish cavalry forces had begun raiding Albanian territories in the east, a common Ottoman tactic to weaken an enemy before beginning a full-scale invasion. On 23 April, Raimon d'Ortafà, Alfonso's governor in Albania, feared that the Turkish invasion would force many of the Albanians to turn to Islam and sent letters to Alfonso for aid. Mehmed, believing that the misunderstandings between the Albanian leaders was at its most critical point, ordered a force of 25,000-27,000 inexperienced men. His reasoning was that these could weaken Albanian forces enough so that he could then launch a concerted invasion. The force was under the main command of Tahip Pasha. Tahip would split his forces into two parts, one under his command, and the other under his subordinate, Hamza Pasha. Mehmed had been tied up in war in the east so he let Hamza ride back to the west.

=== Battle of Modrič ===
Skanderbeg gathered 14,000 men and marched against Tahip Pasha's army. Skanderbeg planned to first defeat Hamza and then to move around Tahip and encircle him. Hamza had 10,000-12,000 men under his personal command and was camped near the new fortress of Modrič. Skanderbeg did not give Hamza much time to prepare and, on 21 July, he assaulted immediately. The fierce attack made short work of the Ottoman force, resulting in them fleeing. Much of the force fell on the field and the parts that ran away were pursued.

Hamza was captured in the battle as well as his staff. Francesco Sansovino, in Historia universale dell'origine et imperio de'Turchi, states that Hamza, fearing punitive measures, begged for mercy, arguing that he had only fought against Skanderbeg since he had been ordered to. According to Demetrio Franco, one of Skanderbeg's earliest biographers, Skanderbeg responded in such a way that the Ottoman officers began to cry and he offered to have dinner with them. After this, he ordered for his prisoners to be put under guard and to be treated properly. The men were freed in the end, but Hamza and his staff were ransomed for 13,000 ducats. Franco reports that Skanderbeg's magnanimity became known throughout Albania and the Ottoman Empire to the point where many of his men gained much more respect for him as a warrior. Skanderbeg's intention in doing so was to show that he would not take advantage of the unfortunate and that he had enough confidence in his ability to let his enemies fight him again another day.

=== Battle of Meçad ===
Skanderbeg had kept the captured Ottoman foot-soldiers under his control, however. The same day that he defeated Hamza's army he sent several men to Tahip's army (which had moved to the center of Albania) where they displayed the captives along with the captured Ottoman standards in order to demoralize Tahip's army. Tahip was not intimidated and split his forces in two in the plains of Meçad, with his elite forces covering his flanks. Skanderbeg, however, had sent Moses of Dibra around Tahip's rear flanks in order to weaken the Ottoman army before launching his main attack. After this was done, Skanderbeg then attacked with his own men. In the heat of the battle, Moses was able to spot out Tahip and after a fierce duel, managed to kill him. The Turks were thus left without their commander and they fled.

== Aftermath ==
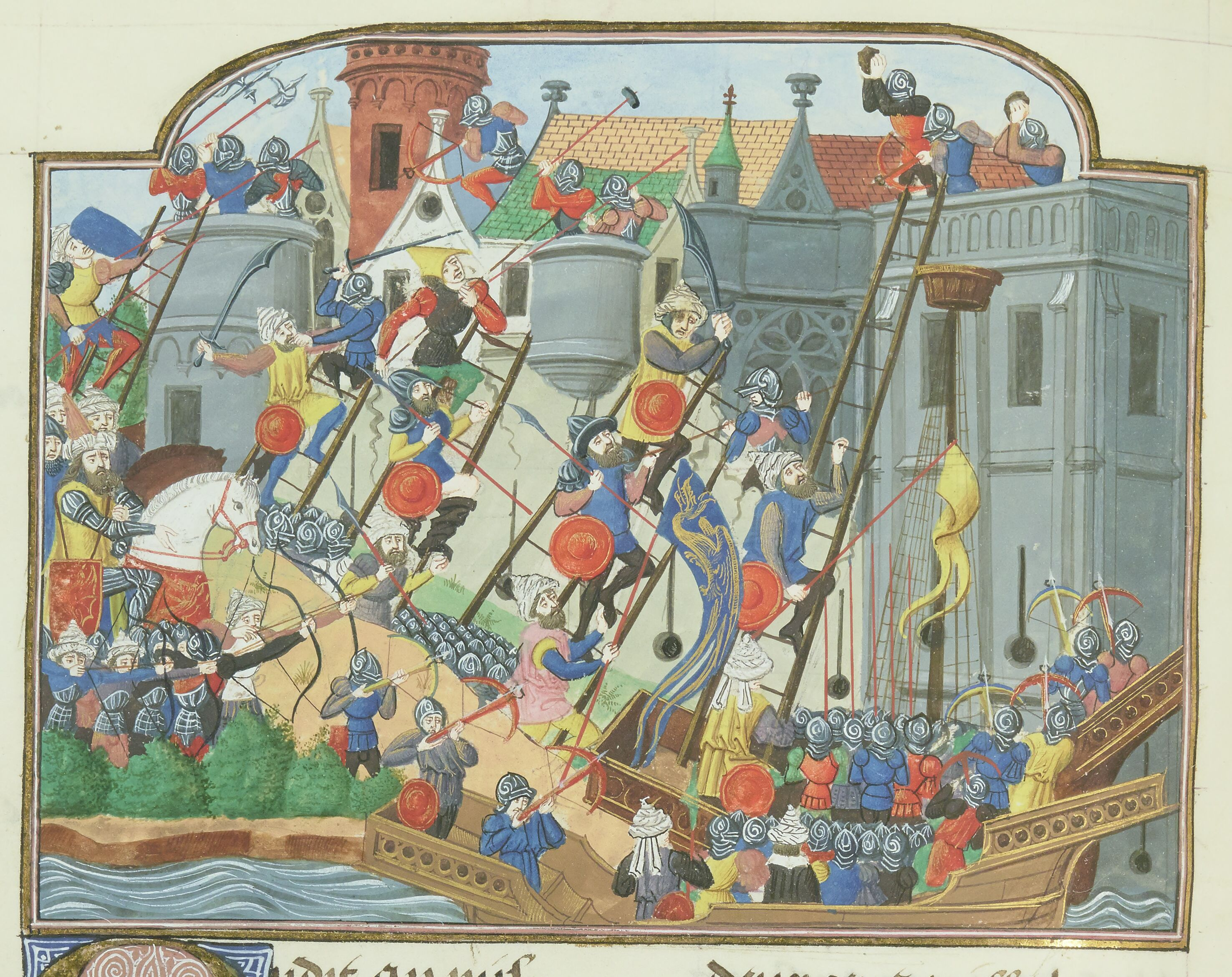
The Fall of Constantinople.

In the battles of Modrica and Meçad 7,000 Ottoman forces were left dead on the battlefield along with thousands of horses. The Albanians had suffered 1,000 casualties themselves and, in their exhaustion, they refused to pursue the fleeing Ottoman forces. Hamza Pasha and his staff were ransomed to the sultan. Raimon d'Ortafà reported Skanderbeg's victory to Alfonso who received it with great exuberance. Skanderbeg's victory over a ruler even more powerful than Murad came as a great surprise to the Albanians. Skanderbeg's reputation among his allies was redeemed and the Dukagjini opted for a reconciliation.

In order to reduce the risk of Ottoman expeditions prompted by Venice, Skanderbeg took several steps to soften relations with the Republic. In the autumn of 1452, Đurađ Branković attacked the Venetian city of Cattaro. Skanderbeg sent a troop of men to aid the Venetians to thwart the attack, but Venice, despite thanking the Albanian, still held its animosity towards him. Skanderbeg took another step. He sent an "orator", Ezop Zguri, to Alfonso in order to ask for military aid and to convince Alfonso to urge for a reconciliation with Venice. The first request could not be fulfilled: Alfonso responded that he had neither the men nor the means to help Skanderbeg. The second request, however, was satisfied and on 5 March 1453, Alfonso sent a letter censuring Venice for not paying its dues to Skanderbeg and also for supporting Skanderbeg's enemies. He thus urged for a peremptory measure to all Albanian-Venetian conflicts.

On 22 April 1453, Mehmed sent another expedition to Albania under Ibrahim Pasha, only to be defeated at Pollog with Ibrahim killed in action. The Albanian victory, however, was shadowed by Mehmed's conquest of Constantinople only five weeks after, which deeply troubled the Christian states of Europe. Mehmed, by then called el-Fātiḥ ("the Conqueror"), turned his attention to finally defeating the Kingdom of Hungary and crossing into Italy.

The European powers were locked in internal conflicts: e.g. the war in Lombardy. Skanderbeg believed that the threat of Mehmed launching his withheld European campaigns was at its highest. He sent urgent requests to Venice to prepare for a new Ottoman offensive, thus attempting to develop an Albanian-Venetian alliance. While recognizing the threat and Skanderbeg's sovereignty over Albania, Venice withheld an establishment of an alliance. Alfonso promised to send men and an annual pension of 1500 ducats to Skanderbeg, whereas Pope Nicholas V sent 5,000 florins. Albania, Ragusa, Serbia, and Hungary then made a loose anti-Ottoman coalition to halt any future Turkish expansions.
