= Kepi i Rodonit =

Rocky cape in Albania

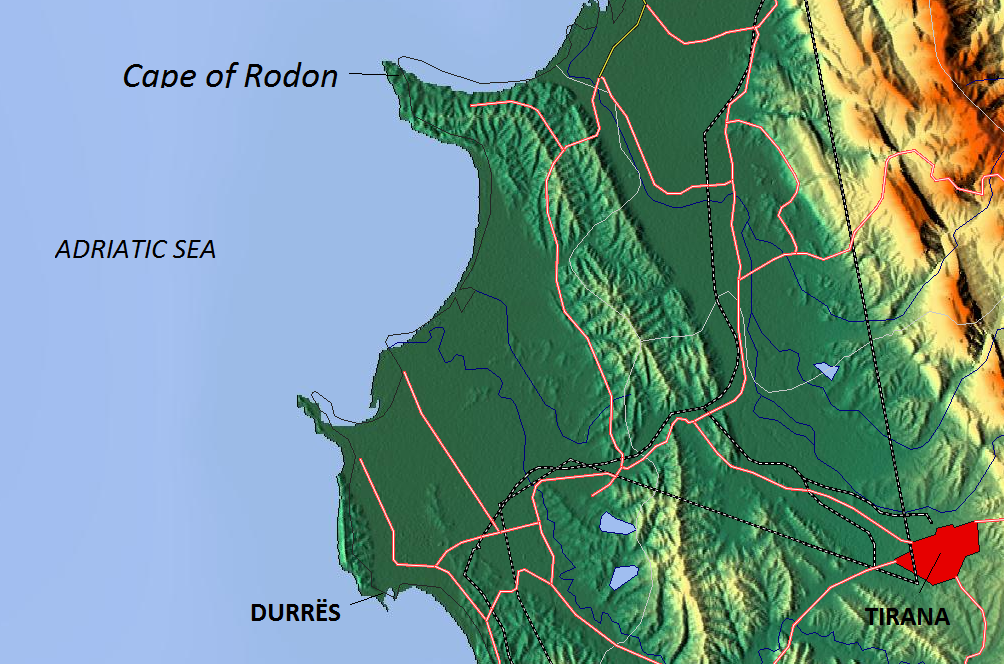
- Map of the Cape of Rodon

- Location: Southern Europe
- Coordinates: 41°35′9″N 19°26′59″E
- Ocean/sea sources: Adriatic Sea, Mediterranean Sea
- Basin countries: Albania
- Settlements: Durrës

Kep i Rodonit Lighthouse Cape of Rodon
- Location: Kepi i Rodonit, Albania
- Coordinates: 41°35′03″N 19°26′59″E

Tower
- Constructed: 1884 (first)
- Foundation: concrete base
- Construction: metal lamp post
- Height: 3 m (9.8 ft)
- Shape: cylindrical lamp post
- Markings: grey metal post with light atop
- Power source: solar power

Light
- First lit: 2007 (current)
- Focal height: 40 m (130 ft)
- Range: 8 nmi (15 km; 9.2 mi)
- Characteristic: Fl(2) W 10s

Kepi i Rodonit or Kepi i Skënderbeut (Albanian: Kepi i Rodonit or Kepi i Skenderbeut) is a rocky cape on the Adriatic Sea north of Durrës, Albania. On the cape is the Rodoni Castle, built by Skanderbeg in 1463, and Saint Anthony Church. Further south in the bay between the cape and Rrushkull Reserve there exist several beach resorts like “Lura” and “San Pietro Resort”, gathering a considerable amount of tourists during the summer months.

== Name ==
The name Redon appears in ancient inscriptions found in Santa Maria di Leuca (present-day Lecce), and on coins minted by the Illyrian city of Lissos, suggesting that he was worshipped as the guardian deity of the city, and probably as a sea god. The fact that Redon was always depicted on coins wearing a petasos demonstrates a connection with travelling and sailing, which led historians to the conclusion that Redon was the deity protector of travellers and sailors. Indeed, the inscriptions of Santa Maria di Leuca were carved by the crews of two Roman merchant ships manned by Illyrians. Inscriptions mentioning Redon were also found on coins from the Illyrian cities of Daorson and Scodra, and even in archaeological findings from Dyrrhachium after the establishment of a Roman colony there. His name keeps on being used in the Albanian Kepi i Rodonit, which could be analysed as an Illyrian sanctuary dedicated to the god of the sailors in the past.

== See also ==
- Albanian Adriatic Sea Coast
- Biodiversity of Albania
- Geography of Albania
- Protected areas of Albania

== Sources ==
=== Bibliography ===
- Ceka, Neritan (2013). The Illyrians to the Albanians. Tirana: Migjeni. ISBN 9789928407467.
- Dyczek, Piotr; Kolendo, Jerzy; Łajtar, Adam; Plóciennik, Tomasz; Rzepkowski, Krzysztof (2014). "Une inscription métrique de Lambaesis (CIL, VIII, 2581; F. Buecheler, Carmina Latina epigraphica, 1527) et la statue du dieu illyrien Médaure". Antiquités africaines (in French). 50 (1): 73–84. doi:10.3406/antaf.2014.1560.
