= Ratac Abbey =

Ratac
- Floor plan of the largest church of Ratac

- Location within Montenegro

Religion
- Affiliation: Catholic
- Ecclesiastical or organizational status: Abbey
- Status: inactive

Location
- Location: Bar, modern-day Montenegro
- Interactive map of Ratac
- Coordinates: 42.1223°N 19.0612°E

Ratac or Ratac Abbey (Italian: Santa Maria de Rotezo, Serbian: Манастир Богородице Ратачке) was a fortified monastic complex on the coast of the peninsula between Bar and Sutomore in modern-day Montenegro. Ratac Abbey was under jurisdiction of the Roman Catholic Archdiocese of Bar, though relations between Ratac abbots and Bar archbishops were not always good.

Based on the charters issued to Ratac by the rulers of Serbia of Nemanjić dynasty, Ratac had a hospital that provided treatment to people who lived in poverty. In the middle of the 15th century people infected with leprosy were treated in this hospital.

The earliest source that mentions Ratas is from 1247, though it probably existed much earlier. On 15 March 1306 Stephen Uroš II Milutin of Serbia issued a charter to Ratac in which he appointed his son Stephen as his future successor.

Building of the new church within the already existing monastic complex began in 1347.

At the beginning of the First Scutari War Ratac was captured by Venetians. In 1407 representatives of the Venetian Republic and Balša III met on the territory in possession of Ratac in attempt to negotiate peace. During negotiations held in June 1408 Venetians insisted to keep Ratac in their possession.

The Treaty of Vučitrn, signed in Vučitrn on 22 April 1426 between the Republic of Venice and the Serbian Despotate, formally ended the Second Scutari War. By this treaty Venice ceded Ratac to Serbian despotate. Ratac was included into the list of Serbian demands probably based on the pressure of the people from Bar on Serbian negotiators.

Since 1443 it was again under Venetian control until 1571 when it was destroyed by the Ottomans.

In the 15th century the abbot of Ratac monastery was Georgius Pelino, one of the most notable priests and businessmen of his time. Pelinović was not the only abbot of Ratac Abbey. According to one 1445 Venetian report, there were two abbots in Ratac who shared the income of the abbey. Pelinović managed to remove his colleague and continued to manage the monastery alone. He was succeeded by Petar Fortis. When in the late 16th century jurisdiction of the Benedictine monastery Ratac collapses the Orthodox rite began to strengthen in the area of Catholic parishes Spič, Sozina and Kastel Lastva which were under jurisdiction of this monastery. The Orthodox clergy and the Orthodox believers at the same time began to use Catholic Churches of that area for their rites.
