= Ramon d'Ortafà =

15th-century Spanish Catalan noble

- Years active: 15th century
- Title: Viceroy of Albania, Sclavonia and Greece; Captain General of Albania

Ramon d'Ortafà was a 15th-century Spanish Catalan noble, originally of Perpignan.

In 1452, King Alfonso V of the Kingdom of Naples appointed Ramon d'Ortafà as Viceroy of Albania, Sclavonia and Greece and Captain General of Albania. The Catalans were tasked with minting 1,500 ducats in the town of Krujë, following direct orders from King Alfonso V of Aragon. These coins featured the king's effigy on the obverse and the cross of Saint George on the reverse, as per the monarch's express instructions. d’Ortafà's task was to ensure the safety of Krujë, to capture as much territory as possible from Muslim "infidels" and to protect Catholicism among local population because it was endangered by the Islamisation of the population of Albania.

To accomplish his task, d’Ortafà appointed Pere Escuder as castellan of Krujë castle instead of Skanderbeg. He organized reconstruction of the fortifications of Krujë castle, which was in poor condition, and also fortified some other positions suitable for organization of the resistance against the Ottoman advances, including Cape Rodoni. Alphonso V sent wheat, wine and a contingent of soldiers to support d’Ortafà.

To ensure loyalty of the local population of Krujë, d’Ortafà promised them not only to protect their city from the Ottoman incursions but also to expand its borders by capturing nearby Muslim populated territories. d’Ortafà gave a brocade to Skanderbeg.
