= Castle of Rodon =

Castle in eastern Albania

Rodoni Castle Kalaja e Rodonit
- Cape of Rodon, Durrës, Albania
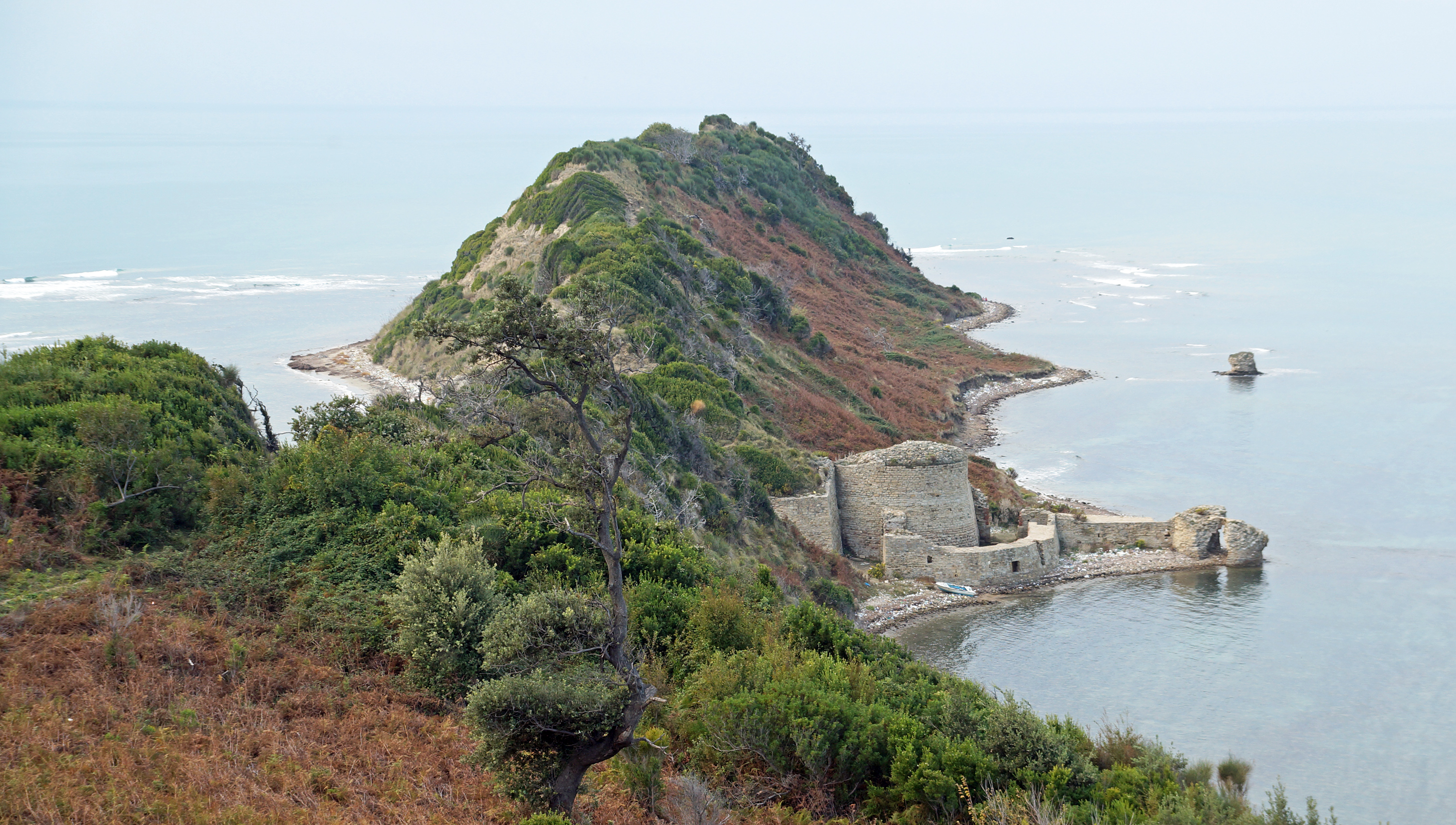
- Castle on the Cape of Rodon

Site information
- Owner: Albania
- Controlled by: League of Lezhë; Republic of Venice; Albania
- Open to the public: Yes
- Condition: Ruin

Location
- Coordinates: 41.585837498480814°N 19.448205864460977°E
- Height: 400 metres

Site history
- Built: 1450
- Built by: Skanderbeg
- Battles/wars: First Siege of Krujë, League of Lezhë, Siege of Krujë

The Rodoni Castle or Skanderbeg Castle (Albanian: Kalaja e Rodonit; Kalaja e Skënderbeut) is a castle in Albania. Rodoni Castle is at an elevation of 1 metre (3 ft).

== Overview ==
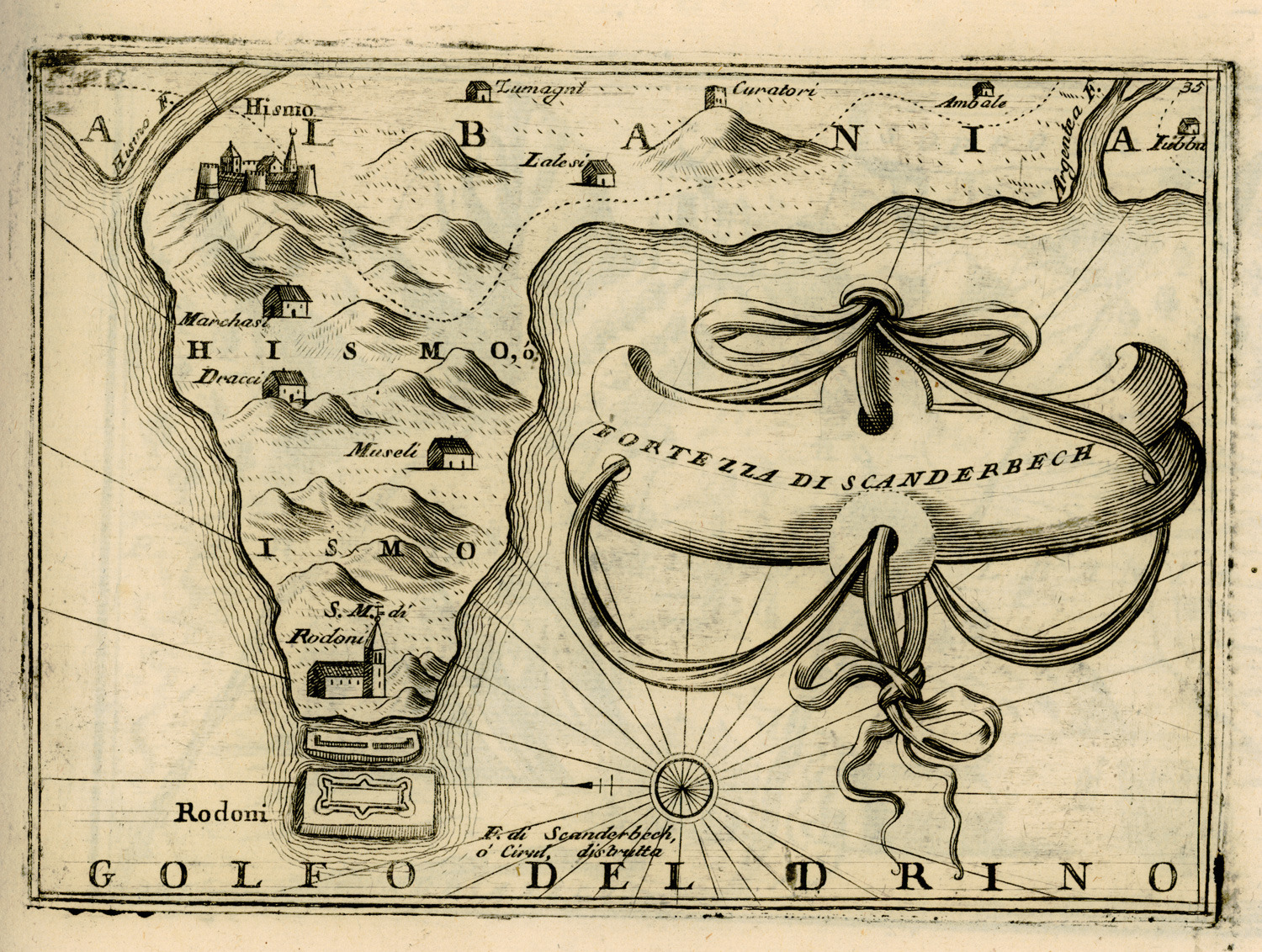
Map of the Cape of Rodon by Vincenzo Coronelli showing the Castle of Rodon and the St. Anthony Church

Rodoni Castle is on the Cape of Rodon. After the victorious First Siege of Krujë the League of Lezhë decided to increase the fortifications for use against the Ottoman Empire. Skanderbeg chose the cape of Rodon as the location of the castle and construction began in 1450. The walls of the castle that was completed in approximately 1452 had a length of 400 metres (1,300 ft).

When the Siege of Krujë started in 1466 Skanderbeg retreated to Rodoni Castle from where he and his family, together with many people from Albania, were transported to Brindisi in 14 ships. According to Marin Barleti this castle was destroyed by Ottoman forces in 1467.

In 1500 the castle was rebuilt by the Republic of Venice. As a result of the corrosive action of the sea waves, some of the walls are now under the waters of the Adriatic. Today the visitors can see the outer walls on the right side and the tower at the place they intersect.

== Gallery ==
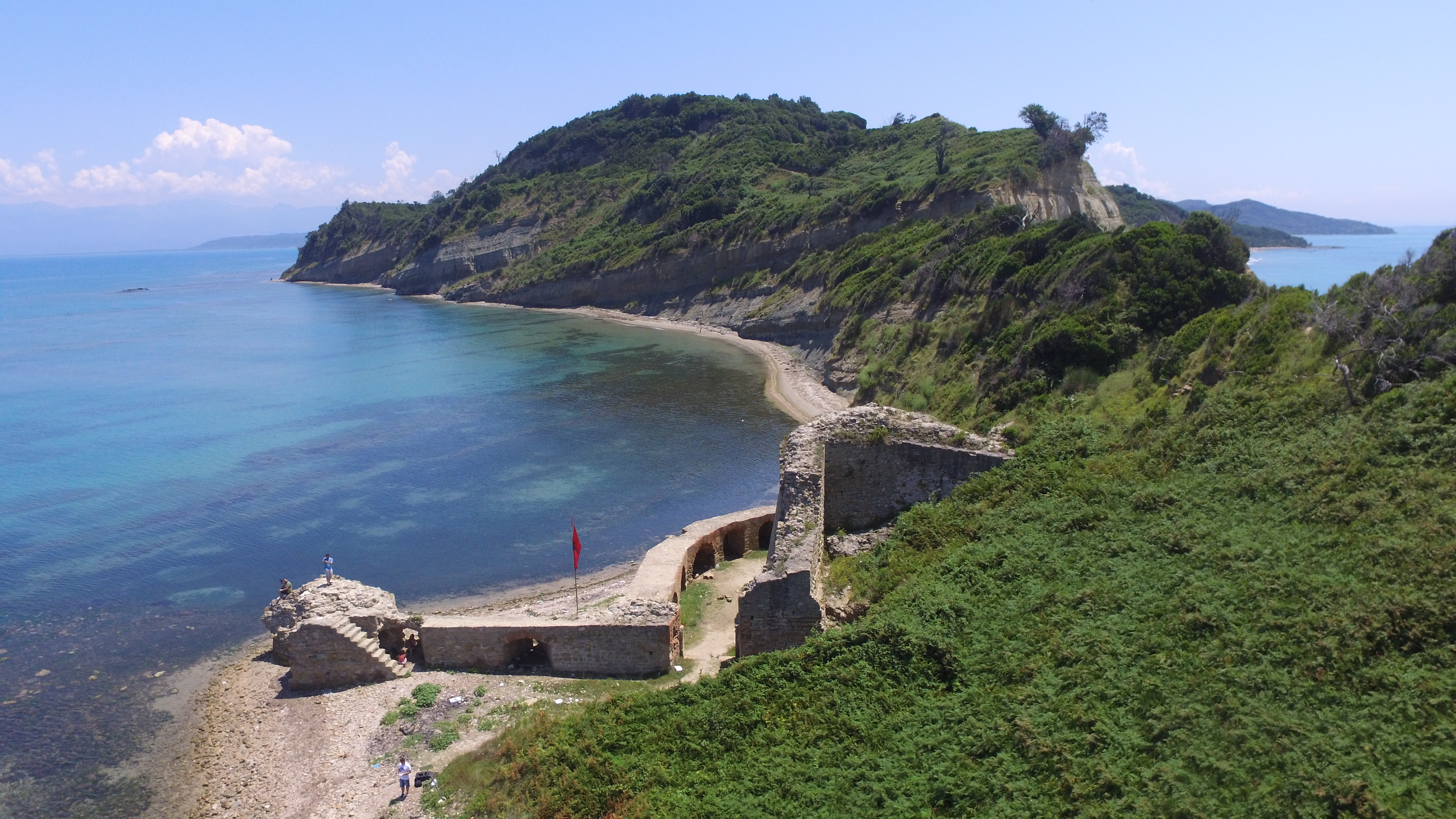

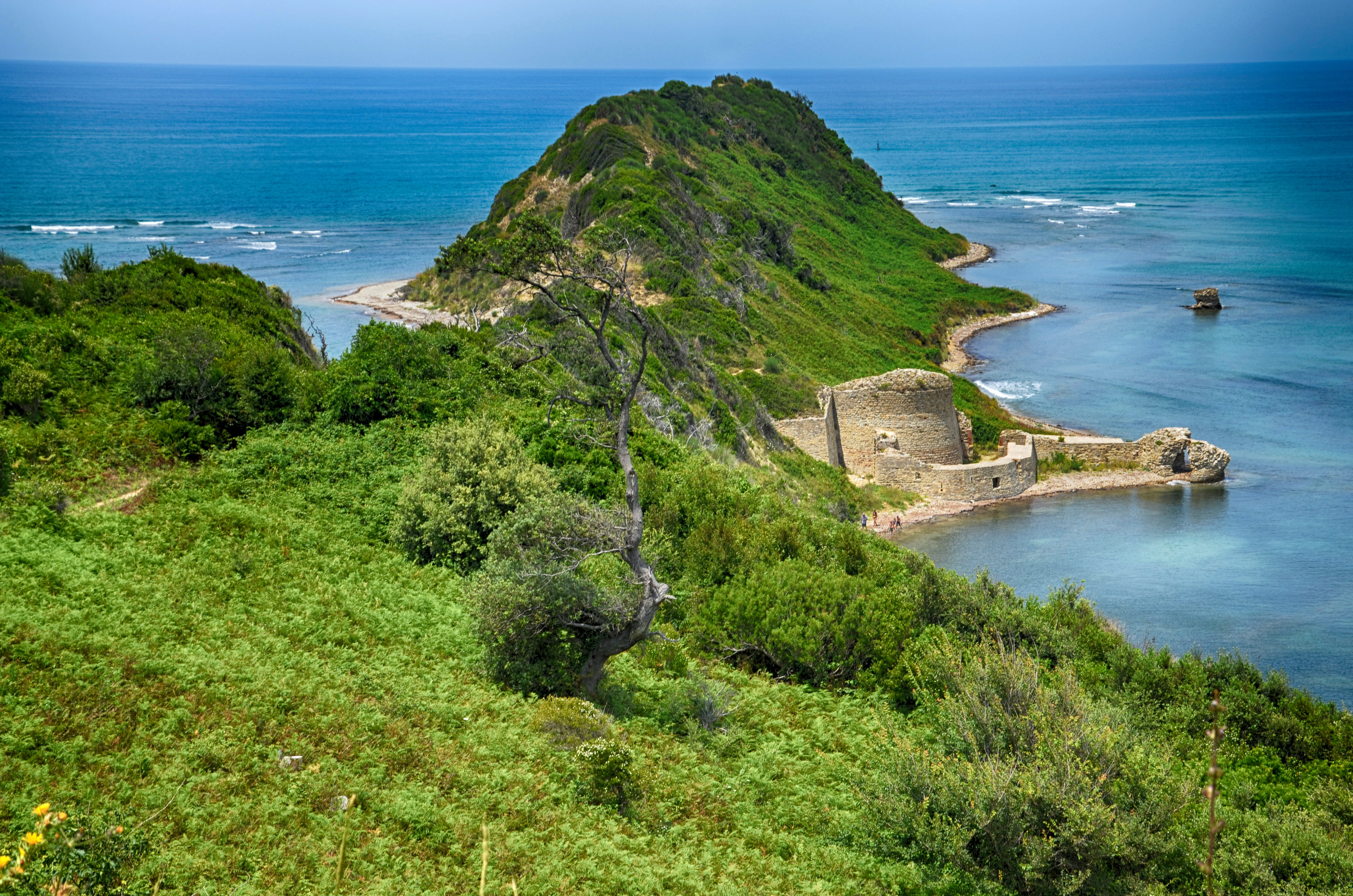

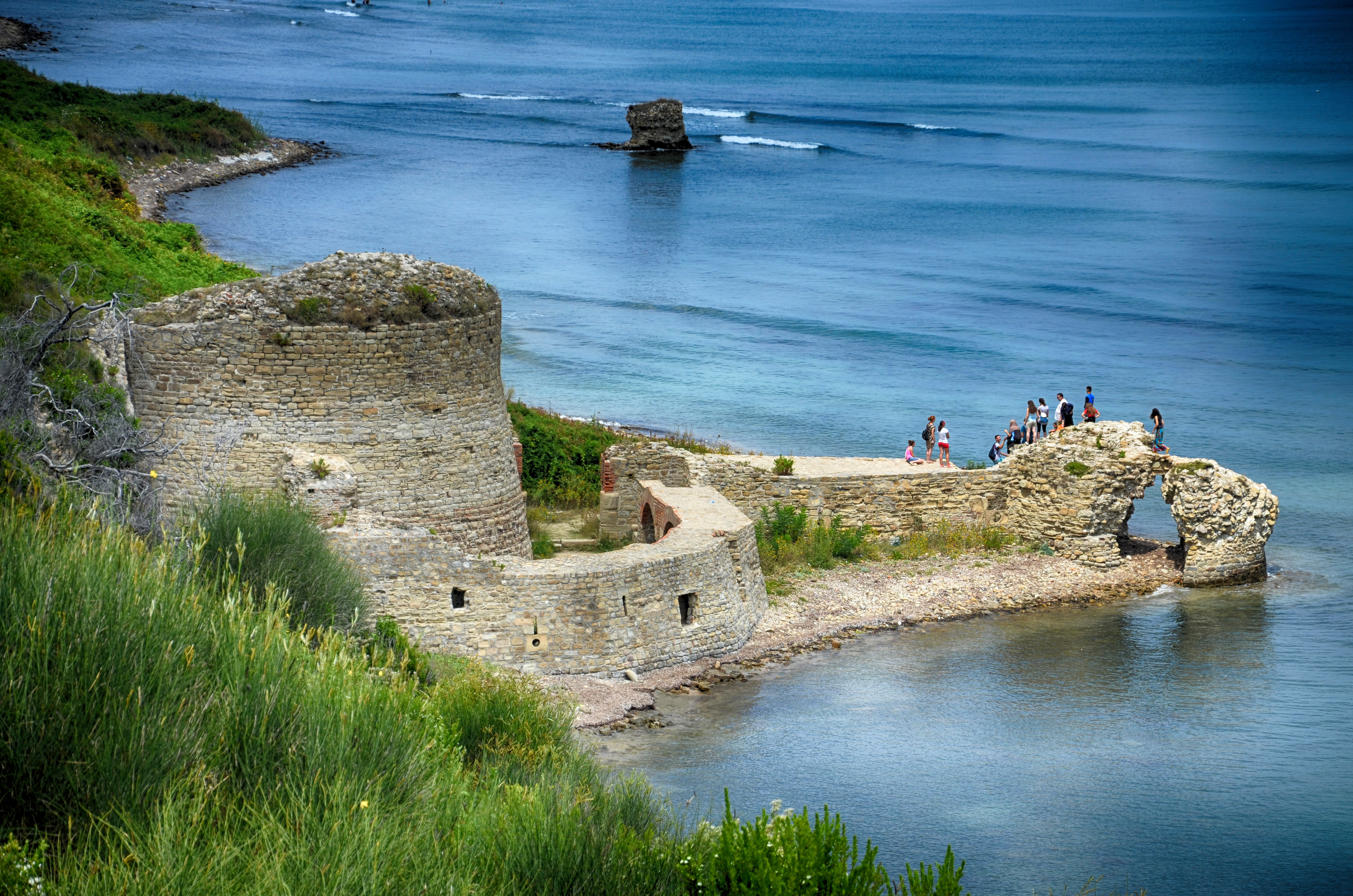

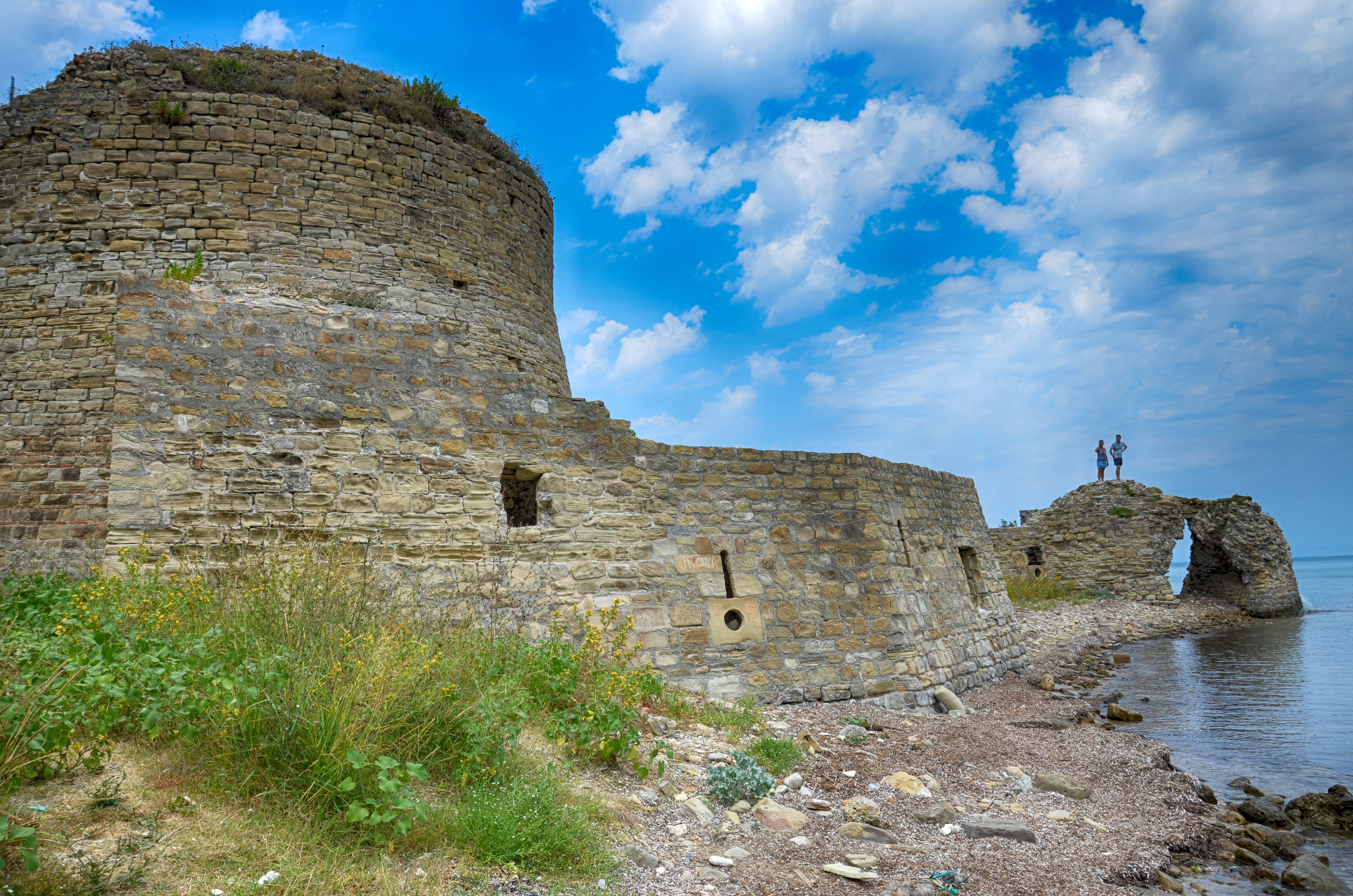

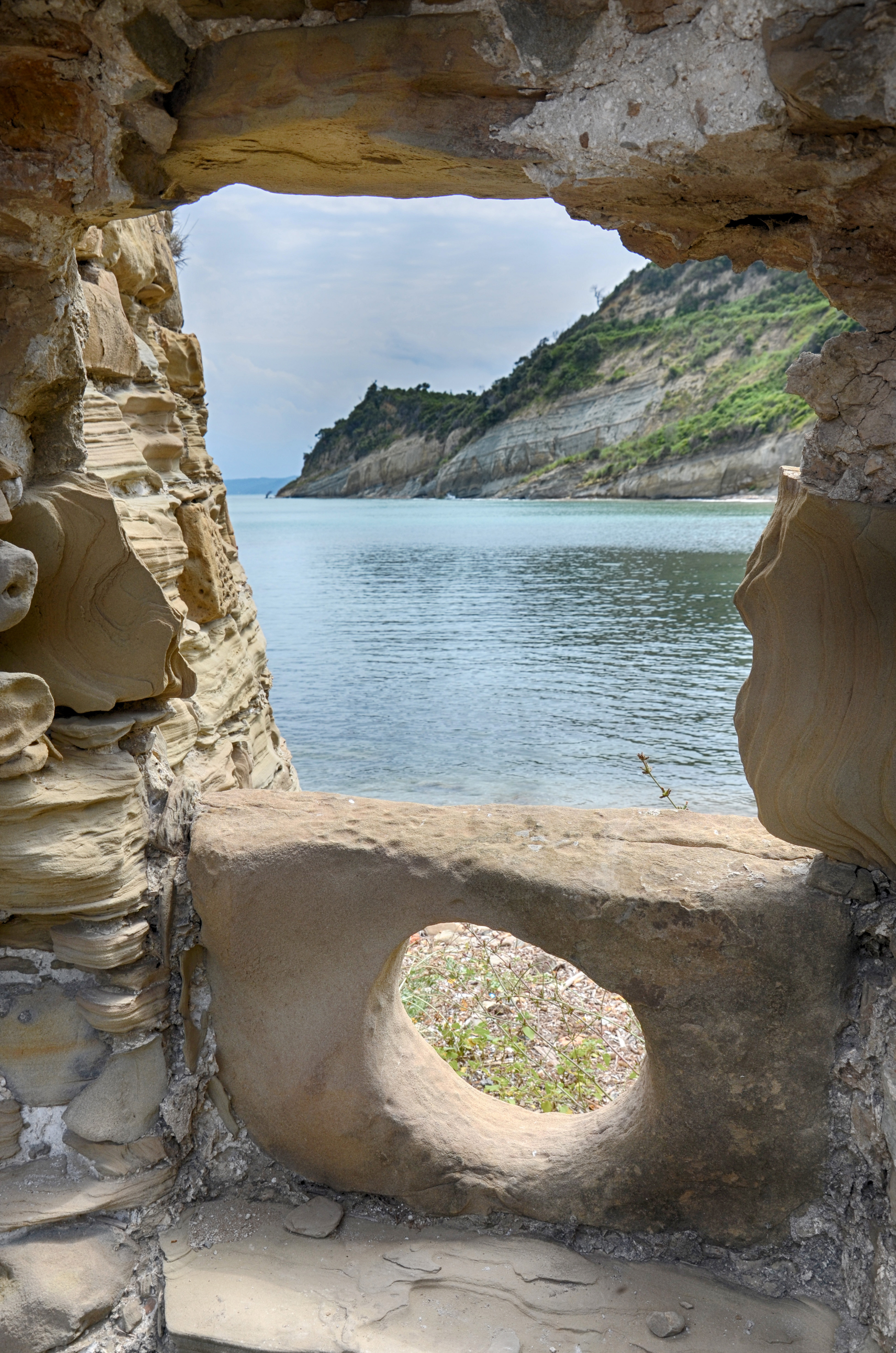

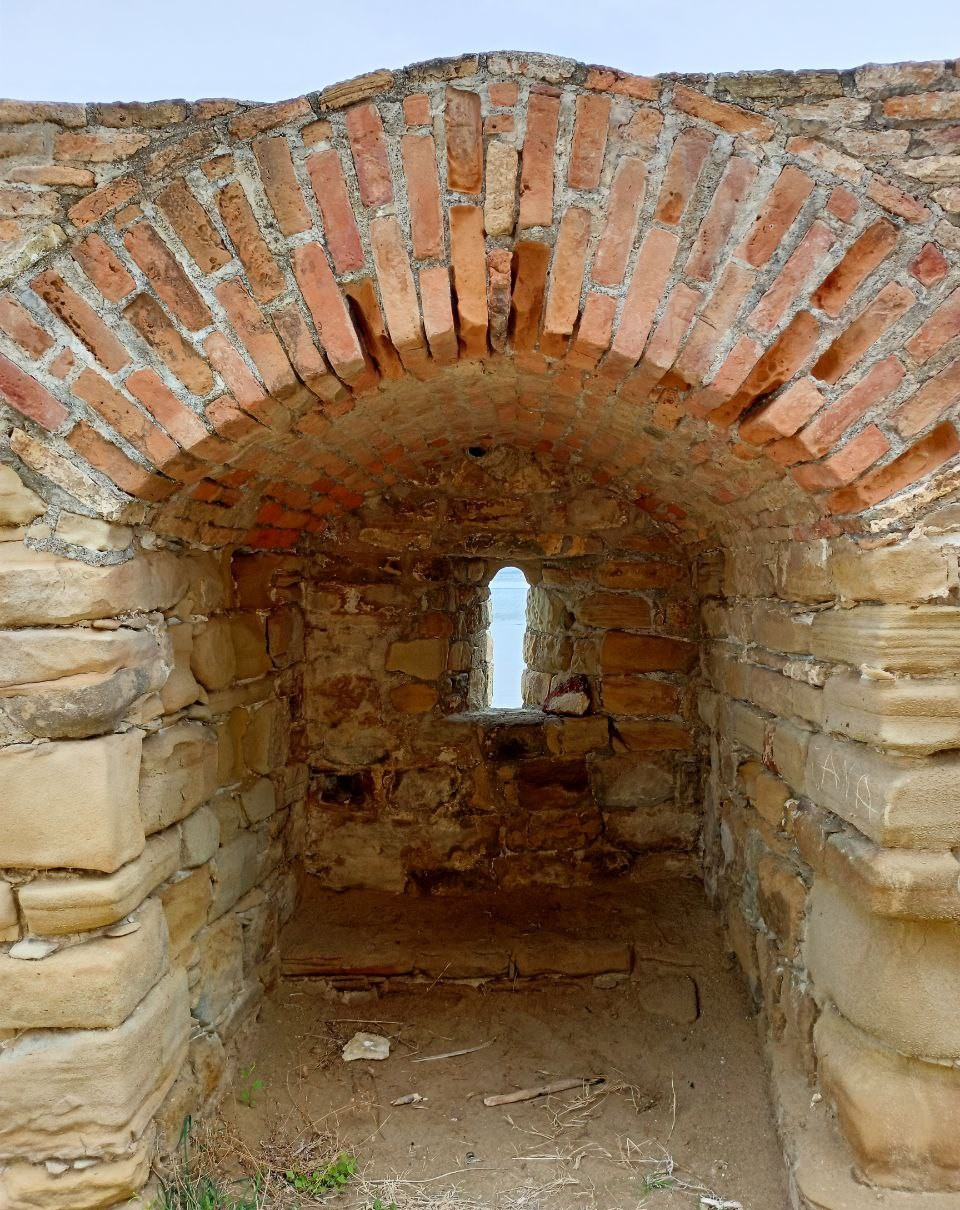

== See also ==
- Skanderbeg
- History of Albania
- Durrës
- Cape of Rodon
- Tourism in Albania
- List of castles in Albania
- Architecture of Albania
- History of Albania during Ottoman administration
