= Skanderbeg's Macedonian campaign =

1462 Albanian attack into the Ottoman Empire

Skanderbeg's Macedonian campaign Fushata e Skënderbeut në Maqedoni
- Part of Albanian–Ottoman Wars (1432–1479)
Date	August 1462
Location	Western Macedonia
Result	Albanian victory

Belligerents
League of Lezhë	Ottoman Empire

Commanders and leaders
Skanderbeg	1st invasion: Hasan bey (POW); 2nd invasion: Isuf bey 3rd invasion: Karaza bey

Strength
8,000	1st invasion: Unknown; 2nd invasion: 18,000; 3rd invasion: 34,000

Casualties and losses
Unknown	Very heavy losses

Skanderbeg's Macedonian campaign (Albanian: Fushata e Skënderbeut në Maqedoni) was a preemptive campaign into the Ottoman Empire in Macedonia by Skanderbeg to defeat three Ottoman armies which had been prepared for the joint-invasion of Albania. From 1461 to 1462, Skanderbeg campaigned in Italy to protect his ally, Ferdinand I, from being overrun by the Angevin dynasty which claimed the Kingdom of Naples. Before setting out for Italy, Skanderbeg forged a truce with Sultan Mehmed II. Upon returning to Albania after securing Ferdinand, the Venetians became hostile to Skanderbeg and a sort of undeclared war took place. Mehmed saw an opportunity to attack Skanderbeg and sent three armies in one year. All three were defeated by Skanderbeg, however, in August 1462.

== Background ==
After Alfonso the Magnanimous died, Skanderbeg established cordial relations with Venice. He ceded the fortress of Sati in 1459 that he had conquered it from the Ottomans. The reconciliation reached the point where Pope Pius II suggested entrusting Skanderbeg's dominions during his Italian expedition, where his swift cavalry tactics managed to defeat the Angevin incursions on several occasions. He was successful enough to entrust the reconquest of Naples to Ferdinand, his ally, and thus returned to Albania. Once it became clear that Skanderbeg had found a new protector, the Venetians became hostile. Trade between the League of Lezhë and the Albania Veneta was cut off. Mehmed II saw an opportunity to finally crush Skanderbeg and sent several armies into Albania.

== Campaign ==
Mehmed successes in the East prompted him to launch a new campaign against Skanderbeg. He prepared by sending 23,000 cavalry under Sinan bey near Albania. Upon learning this, Skanderbeg gathered 8,000 men to march against Sinan. Skanderbeg figured out what route Sinan would take so he chose to encamp in a mountain overlooking the path, near Mokra, marching there by night before the Ottomans. On 7 July 1462, the Ottomans neared and Skanderbeg ordered his men to make loud noises by using their drums and battlehorns and they soon launched a powerful attack. Disorder engulfed the Ottoman ranks and many were cut down. The Albanians gathered rich booty and traveled back to Albania heavy-laden.

=== Battle of Mokra ===
The Sultan, upon hearing of the debacle, dispatched three armies to Albania. Skanderbeg, upon learning of the sultan's plans, immediately marched into Macedonia. A large force under Hasan bey set out to march into Albania through the same pass as Sinan a month before, unaware that Skanderbeg was ready to meet him. While the Ottomans were idle, Skanderbeg ordered the enemy guards to be killed and a full-scale battle soon ensued. Most of the Ottoman soldiers were killed and Hasan himself was wounded by an arrow piercing through his right arm. Despite the fact that most of his army was annihilated and that it was late at night, he took some of his most loyal soldiers up into a more secure place. Skanderbeg came to understand this the next morning and immediately set off to find him. Out of desperation, Hasan came out unarmed and surrendered to Skanderbeg asking for mercy.

=== Battle of Pollog ===
After Hasan's army had been destroyed, Isuf bey went to defeat Skanderbeg and avenge his colleague. With the sultan's permission, he marched out with 18,000 troops to Uskub. From there, he marched onto Pollog near Tetovo. Isuf's fate was similar to Hasan's: Skanderbeg attacked and annihilated Isuf's force but the pasha fled, leaving his army behind to be reduced.

=== Battle of Livad ===
Karaza bey, another of the sultan's commanders, was lured into Albania for hope of attaining glory, despite his old age. Karaza had served with Skanderbeg in Anatolia where they subdued the sultan's rebellious subjects. Karaza was a consummate commander, having fulfilled many important tasks for the sultan. The sultan yielded 30,000 cavalry to Karaza who soon marched to Albania. Unlike his two compatriots before him, Karaza chose to march through Lower Dibra and not Upper Dibra, passing by Ohrid. In the meantime, a scouting force of 4,000 was drawn out ahead of the main army to gather information on the Albanian positions. But the majority of this force was destroyed. The pasha, upon hearing of the disaster, threw a fit of anger less due to his troops being killed than his plans being foiled. Karaza devised a stratagem by which to trick Skanderbeg: he sent several envoys to Skanderbeg condemning his "pusillanimity" and calling on him to fight on the open field instead of hiding in the woods. Skanderbeg knew that Karaza would not respect this promise if he accepted it and sent the envoys back. Karaza then began to conciliate with the native people but Skanderbeg—always being well-informed—immediately ordered an attack on the Ottoman camp. The attack was so fierce that few knew what was happening and chaos ensued. However, Skanderbeg was not able to achieve his goal of annihilation (due to the heavy winds and pouring rain) but he was still able to do much damage to the Ottoman forces. Karaza immediately escaped with much of his army and traveled to Istanbul, where he was pardoned by the sultan for succeeding in preventing the annihilation of his force which the previous commanders fell victim to.

== Aftermath ==
Skanderbeg had won a remarkable victory over a combined force of over 48,000 men by defeating it in three parts. This was the first time that he would win three battles in one month. In summer 1463, a huge army under the sultan's personal command gathered near Uskub, but it was to march into Bosnia. In the assembly of the League of Lezhë, Tanush Thopia made urgent requests to establish peace. Skanderbeg refused, but he was outvoted. The Peace of Uskub was concluded on April 27, 1463, largely out a fear of a resurgent Albanian campaign like the year before. Skanderbeg did not intend to maintain the peace and told Pius that he would march against the Ottomans whenever the latter ordered him to.

The Venetians grew worried after the Peace and soon set out trying to reconcile with Skanderbeg. On August 20, 1463, an alliance against the Ottoman Empire was concluded between the two. The terms of the alliance were that: Venetian contingents and subsidies to be given to Skanderbeg to help in his future wars against the Ottomans; the amount of subsidy would be determined by the Grand Council and the Abbot of Rotezo and not by the Venetian proveditors in Albania; Venetian ships and auxiliary ships were to be present in Albanian waters to protect the population; if Venice concluded peace with Ottoman Empire, Albania was to be included; Skanderbeg's son became a Venetian nobleman; Skanderbeg would be given refuge in Venetian territory in case he was driven out of Albania; his pension arrears would be paid by Venice and not by its proveditors. Later that year, the Pope ordered his crusade to begin and hostilities between Albania-Venice and the Ottomans would resume.
