= Battle of Albulena =

1457 battle of the Ottoman–Albanian wars

Coordinates: 41°36′07″N 19°43′05″E

Battle of Albulena Beteja e Albulenës
- Part of the Albanian–Ottoman Wars (1432–1479)
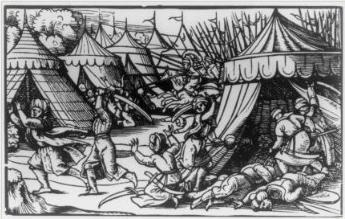
- Engraving of Albanian assaults on an Ottoman camp during the battle
| Date | 2 September 1457 |
| Location | North-central Albania, south of Laç |
| Result | Albanian victory |

Belligerents
| League of Lezhë | Ottoman Empire |

Commanders and leaders
| Skanderbeg; Gojko Balšić; Ivan Balšić; Gjinia Aleksi Lleshi; Lekë III Dukagjini; Nikollë II Dukagjini; Pal II Dukagjini; Vrana Konti | (Ottoman Empire) Ishak Bey; (Ottoman Empire) Hamza Kastrioti (POW) |

Strength
| 8,000–10,000 | 50,000–80,000 |

Casualties and losses
| Unknown | 15,000 killed; 15,000 captured |

The Battle of Albulena (Albanian: Beteja e Albulenës), also known as the Battle of Ujëbardha, was fought on 2 September 1457 between Albanian forces led by Skanderbeg and an Ottoman army under Evrenosoğlu İsa Bey and Skanderbeg's nephew, Hamza Kastrioti.

Skanderbeg had been the leader of the Albanians for over a decade and had seen many victories over the Ottoman armies. However, after his unsuccessful Siege of Berat in 1455, Skanderbeg was betrayed by some of his most trusted officers, among them Moisi Arianit Golemi. Golemi returned the next year with an Ottoman force under his command, but was defeated at the Battle of Oranik and later re-joined Skanderbeg's army. Later, Skanderbeg's dissatisfied nephew, Hamza Kastrioti, betrayed Skanderbeg and was offered joint-command with İsa Bey over a second Ottoman invasion force.

The Ottomans arrived in late May 1457 and marched through the Mat River Valley. Skanderbeg tried to delay the vanguard, composed of Akıncı cavalrymen, but upon the approach of the main force, decided to retreat. Both İsa Bey and Hamza were familiar with Skanderbeg's tactics so the Albanian leader adopted a new one. He split his army into several groups and ordered them to march in separate directions through the mountains and remain unseen by the Ottoman forces until the signal to reassemble was given. The Albanians remained in separate formations until September, by which time the Ottomans had become both exasperated and convinced that Skanderbeg had been defeated. On 2 September 1457, Skanderbeg finally gave the order for his armies to regroup and launched a surprise attack on the Ottoman camp, killing and capturing up to 30,000 men. Among them was Hamza who was later sent as a prisoner to Naples in Italy.

The victory strengthened the morale of the Albanians. There were few, if not any, officers and soldiers who deserted afterwards. The Battle of Albulena has been seen as Skanderbeg's most brilliant victory over the Ottomans. However, it also marked the high point of the Albanian resistance, beginning a new phase in Skanderbeg's quarter-century long war which would include its fiercest Ottoman invasions. Even though Skanderbeg himself had died in January 1468, the war would drag on until 1478 and later in the same year the main Albanian fortress at Krujë fell, finally effecting the annexation of Skanderbeg's Albania by the Ottoman Empire.

== Background ==
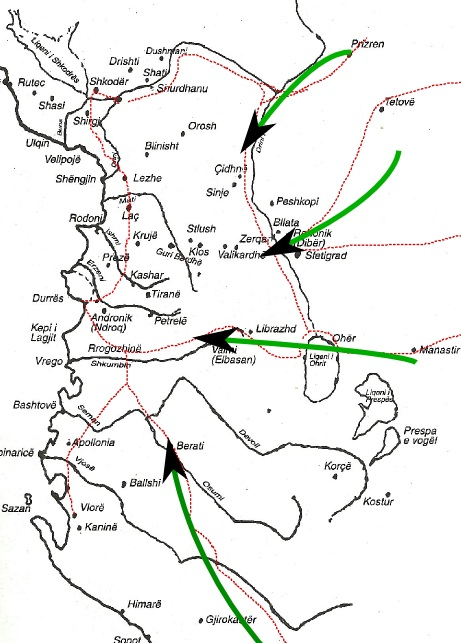
The main roads through Albania and the most common Ottoman invasion routes

Skanderbeg, the ruler of Albania (Latin: dominus Albaniae), had served for several years in the Ottoman army, as both soldier and commander, before returning to his homeland and beginning an uprising against the Ottoman Empire in 1444. The Second Battle of Kosovo in 1448 had ended with the defeat of John Hunyadi, voivode of Transylvania while Skanderbeg and his forces were on their way; but did not arrive due to his army being blocked off by Đurađ Branković and so he was unable to provide help; Hunyadi engaged the Ottomans thinking Skanderbeg was not coming. In response to Branković's delaying, Skanderbeg ravaged Branković's domains. As a result of the defeat, the Ottomans were free from Hungarian pressure, which had been limited to Belgrade and its environs. In 1455, Skanderbeg laid siege to Berat, a fortress which had been seized from his control in 1450. The result was catastrophic for the Albanians who succumbed to an Ottoman counterattack upon Skanderbeg's temporary departure from the main force. Alfonso V of Aragon, Skanderbeg's most helpful and important ally, also suffered a blow to his ambitions which included a pan-Mediterranean empire. The Albanians, however, were able to recover their morale when Pope Calixtus III, who had begun to worry that his plans for crusade would be undermined, promised to aid Skanderbeg.

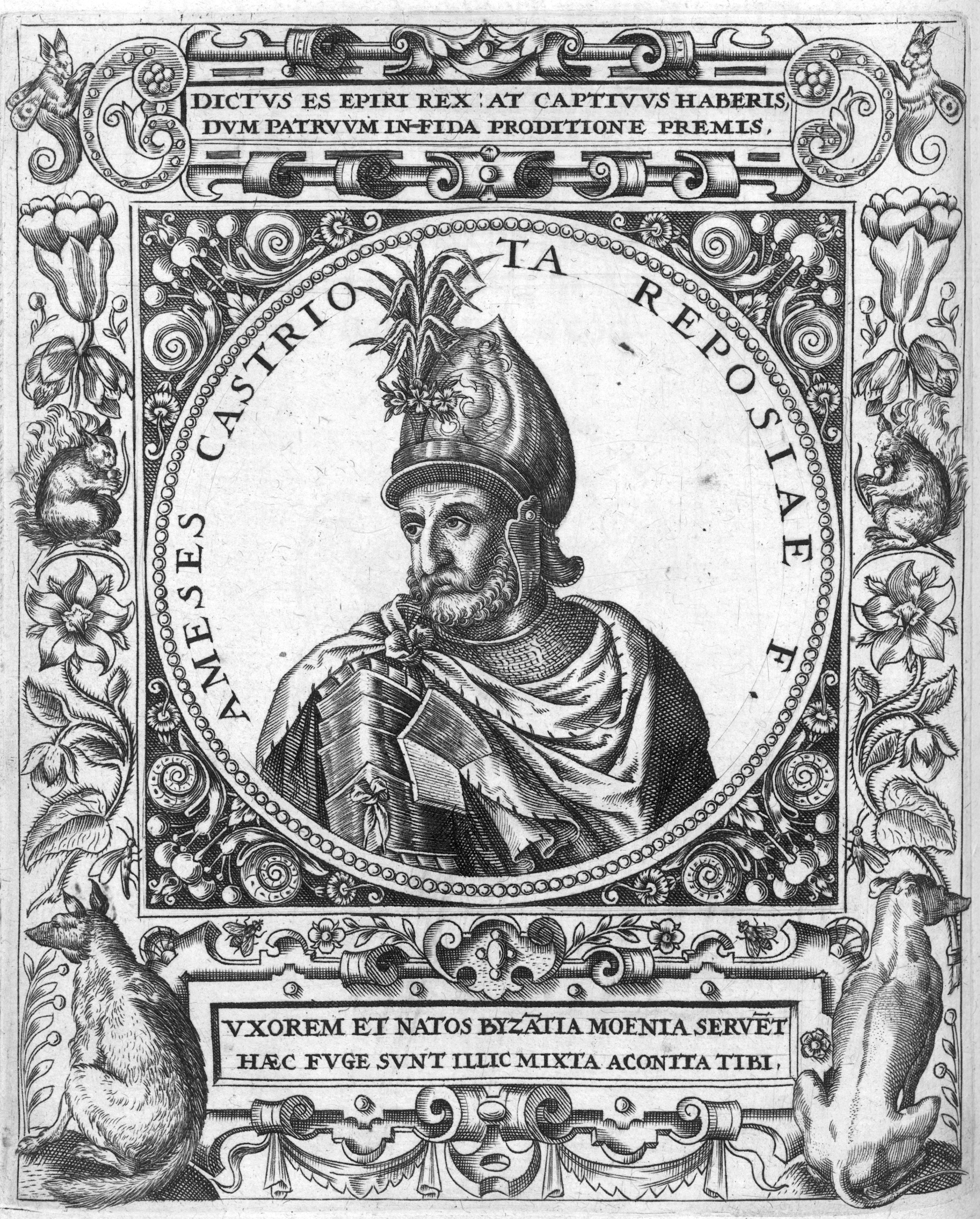
Hamza Kastrioti

Before the planned crusade commenced, Sultan Mehmed II the Conqueror (Turkish: Fatiḥ) decided to march against Hungary and Albania. In April 1456, Skanderbeg sent Pal Engjëlli, his ambassador to the West, with a letter to Cardinal Domenico Capranica informing the Holy See of his need for aid. The Ottoman invasion came in May 1456 when Moisi Golemi, Skanderbeg's former captain who had deserted after loss of Berat, met Skanderbeg's men at the Battle of Oranik. The force was defeated and, through a show of mercy, Golemi was allowed to return to the Albanian ranks without punishment. In July 1456 Mehmed marched a large army to besiege Hungarian-held Belgrade in Serbia, but was defeated by Hunyadi. Later that year, İbrahim II of the Karamanid Dynasty tried to create an anti-Ottoman alliance which would include his realm, Skanderbeg, Hunyadi, Calixtus, and Alfonso, all of whom would act in concert to defeat the sultan. The plans were never put to practice, however.

Skanderbeg's resources were worn out after over a decade of continuous war. Alfonso and the pope could not provide for him fully, while Venice continued to undermine Skanderbeg. The latter considered war with Skanderbeg since he maintained his alliance with Aragon. Relations with the Italian state worsened further when Lekë Dukagjini, Skanderbeg's elusive ally in the north, captured Dagnum. Even though Skanderbeg did not participate in this, Venice used it as a casus belli to launch an expedition against Skanderbeg. War never started but Albanian-Venetian relations sunk to their lowest point. The Venetian rectors continued to provoke Skanderbeg at a time when he had grown relatively weak due to his nephew and one of his most important officers, Hamza Kastrioti, deserting and joining the Ottomans. Hamza had become dissatisfied with Skanderbeg's growing power and, upon being received by the sultan, was offered control over much of Albania once conquered. Stung by the betrayal, Skanderbeg offered an ultimatum to Venice where they had to halt their provocations or begin war. Since a crusade was anticipated against the Ottomans, Venice did not want to seem pro-Ottoman and eased their stance towards Albania.

== Campaign ==
By the end of May 1457, a large Ottoman army was seen approaching Albania. Skanderbeg sent a letter to Calixtus informing him of the Ottoman arrival and the dire need for military aid. The pope responded with a promise to send a fleet to Albania – even though the enemy was on land – but it did not arrive. Skanderbeg was thus left to fight the oncoming Ottoman army alone. Mehmed II had placed Ishak Bey Evrenoz and Hamza Kastrioti in command of the force. İsa Bey was an experienced commander who had crushed Gjon Kastrioti's rebellion in 1430 and led the Ottoman counterattack at the Siege of Berat. Hamza brought along with him several disaffected Albanian nobles and personal knowledge of the tactics they could expect from Skanderbeg. In total, Ottoman forces numbered between 50,000 and 80,000 men. Armies of this size were usually commanded by the sultan himself so rumors spread that Mehmed was leading the campaign. In contrast, Skanderbeg had between 8,000 and 10,000 men to stand in opposition.

=== Skanderbeg's "disappearance" ===
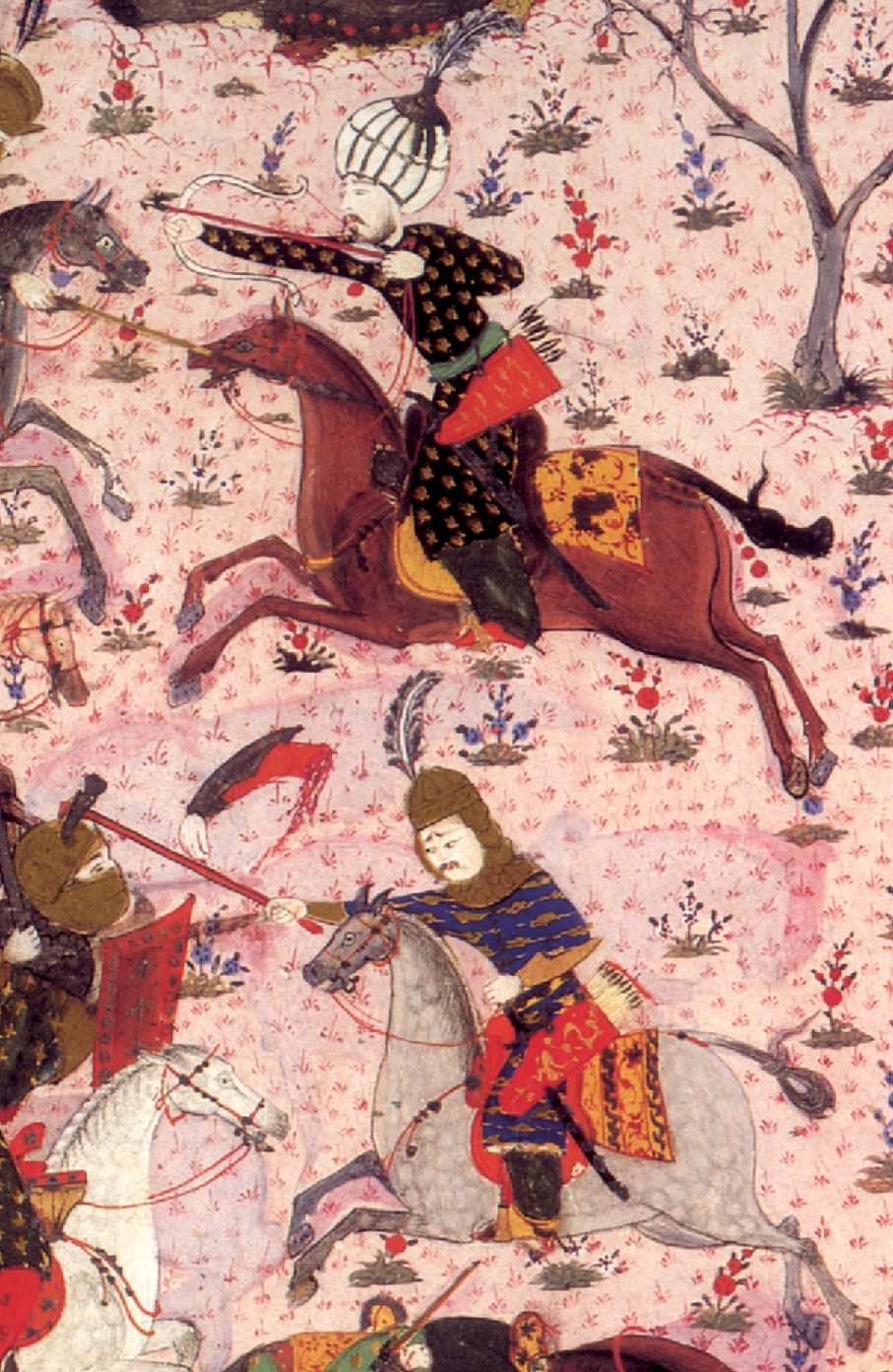
Detail of a miniature, showing two leaders of the Akıncı in the Battle of Mohács, 1526

The Ottoman army did not march into Albania in one group. The first detachments to arrive were the Akıncı who marched through Dibër. Skanderbeg stalled this force's advance, but, once the main force arrived, the Albanians were not able to offer further resistance and withdrew. Realizing that both Ottoman commanders, İsa Bey and Hamza, were familiar with the Albanian terrain and his tactics, Skanderbeg decided to adopt a new means of engagement. Normally, he would lure his enemy into a trap and then ambush them. His new tactic was very similar to his normal; however, he chose to approach it in a different manner. To make it impossible to be followed, Skanderbeg split his forces into several groups and ordered their respective commanders to march through the forests and mountains in different directions and to never assemble or assault the Ottomans unless instructed to do so. The Albanian warriors were supplied by the locals and supply depots set throughout the mountains as they marched.

The Ottomans marched through Mat and pillaged the area. Skanderbeg took parallel routes through the mountains. Since he had not yet engaged Skanderbeg, İsa Bey decided not to besiege Krujë, Albania's main fortress, until he was sure of the Albanian's fate. He thus camped with his men in the area north of Mount Tumenishta (Skënderbeu) to wait for Skanderbeg's appearance. This region was called Albulena (Albanian: Uji i Bardhë), located south of modern-day Laç. It was surrounded by a series of protective hills where guards were placed. Since Tumenishta had served as the main base for Skanderbeg's forays into the Ottoman camp at the Siege of Krujë (1450), İsa Bey and Hamza prepared to annihilate any resistance they would find there. This effort came in vain, however, as they were not challenged by any Albanian forces. Still unsure of Skanderbeg's dispositions, the Ottoman commanders strengthened the camp's northern defenses, while the eastern side, in the direction of Tumenishta, remained lightly defended. Ottoman scouts crossed the Mat River into northern Albania. They were seen at the gates of Venetian-held Alessio (Lezhë) and ventured deeper into Venetian territory.

Due to Skanderbeg's "disappearance", rumour's began to spread that he had fled since he was unable to confront the Ottomans and that his men had betrayed him. This was further upheld by the Venetians in Durazzo (Durrës). İsa Bey and Hamza continued to be wary, however, and their reconnaissance forces reached as far north as Scutari (Shkodër). Skanderbeg remained in the mountains throughout July and August. It is not known with certainty what his army did while in the mountains, but he planned to wear the Ottomans out by forcing them to wait and to make them believe that he had been decisively defeated. Skanderbeg then sent Gjergj Pjetri (George Peter) to Rome as an ambassador to give the Pope the impression that Albania had been decisively conquered and that aid was necessary to force the Ottomans out of Albania. On 17 September 1457, Calixtus notified Skanderbeg that he had sent Johan Navarre to help fund the crusade. By the time he arrived, however, the situation had already changed.

=== Battle ===
The local population remained faithful to Skanderbeg and did not reveal his whereabouts. İsa Bey and Hamza grew confident that Skanderbeg had been defeated and had thus began to withdraw. When he judged the time right, Skanderbeg gave the signal for the army, which had up until then been in separate groups, to assemble without being seen by the Ottomans. The army gathered by the hills at Tumenishta – as the weakest point in the Ottoman camp was in this direction – and on 2 September 1457, it was split again into three groups to assault the Ottoman camp. With some of his most trusted men, he climbed to a high peak to scout on the Ottoman camp and saw that the Ottomans were resting. He descended with his chosen band to eliminate any watching guards, but one saw Skanderbeg and fled into the camp yelling that Skanderbeg had arrived. In order to maintain the surprise, Skanderbeg ordered his men to get ready for battle.

With the accompaniment of loud noise made from metallic tools and weapons being clapped together, the Albanians charged into the Turkish camp. The Ottomans were caught by surprise and, despite their large numbers, were terrified by the fury of the Albanian assault, thinking they were attacking in larger numbers than they actually had. Hamza tried to reorder his men, assuring them that the Albanians were few. İsa Bey tried to send reinforcements to Hamza's men, but the arrival of new Albanian contingents forced him to turn his attention. A series of cavalry charges and counter-charges kept the battle moving with a rain of missiles and arquebusiers forcing the Ottomans into the heart of the camp. Seeing that they were surrounded, the Ottoman force began to panic and melted away. Hamza was thus captured, though İsa Bey fled. The Ottoman dead may have been as high as 30,000, but it is unlikely that they suffered more than 15,000 deaths. In addition, 15,000 men were taken prisoner, twenty-four standards were captured, and all the riches in the camp were lost to the Albanians. A multitude of men were also captured, among them Hamza Kastrioti. The fallen Albanian warriors were buried in the Cathedral of St. Mary in the village of Shëmri (3 kilometres (1.9 mi) east of Mamurrasi) near the battlefield.

== Aftermath ==
The battle of Albulena was significant for the southern resistance against the Ottoman Empire. Franz Babinger, a historian of the Ottoman Empire, describes the battle as Skanderbeg's most brilliant victory. The battle of Albulena strengthened the morale of Skanderbeg's men who afterwards rarely, if at all, deserted his army as Hamza had. Hamza himself was sent as a prisoner to Naples in Alfonso's realm after being captured. An Ottoman envoy was sent to ransom the standard bearers and forty of the distinguished prisoners. The envoy also tried to settle for a truce between Mehmed and Skanderbeg, but the latter responded that he would only accept if Svetigrad and Berat, which had been lost in 1448 and 1450 respectively, were restored to his state. Seeing that Mehmed would not accept such terms, Skanderbeg strengthened his garrisons in the area around Svetigrad. The victory still bought Albania and Italy time; in 1460, Mehmed and Skanderbeg signed an armistice that lasted three years. This gave Skanderbeg the opportunity to land in Italy and help out Alfonso's son, Ferdinand I of Naples, who had been crowned after his father had died. The battle thus opened a new phase in the Ottoman-Albanian war which saw the high-water mark of the Albanian resistance and the fiercest Ottoman invasions of Albania in the war. The war would last until the fall of Krujë in 1478.

The Albanian feminine first name Albulena, originating as a reference to the battle, is still in use today.

== Sources ==
- Babinger, Franz (1978). Hickman, William C. (ed.). Mehmed the Conqueror and His Time. Translated by Manheim, Ralph. Princeton, New Jersey: Princeton University Press. ISBN 978-0-691-01078-6.
- Barleti, Marin (1508). The Memoirs of Scanderbeg. Harvard University Press.
- Hodgkinson, Harry (1999). Scanderbeg: From Ottoman Captive to Albanian Hero. London: Centre for Albanian Studies. ISBN 978-1-873928-13-4.
- Frashëri, Kristo (2002). Gjergj Kastrioti Skënderbeu: jeta dhe vepra (1405-1468) (in Albanian). Tirana: Botimet Toena. ISBN 99927-1-627-4.
- Elsie, Robert (2004). Historical Dictionary of Kosova. Plymouth: Scarecrow Press. ISBN 978-0-8108-5309-6.
- Runciman, Steven (1990). The Fall of Constantinople 1453. Cambridge: Cambridge University Press. ISBN 978-0-521-39832-9.
- Setton, Kenneth Meyer (1978). The Papacy and the Levant, 1204-1571. Vol. II. Philadelphia: American Philosophical Society. ISBN 978-0-87169-127-9.
- Sugar, Peter (1983). Southeastern Europe Under Ottoman Rule, 1354-1804. Seattle: University of Washington Press. ISBN 978-0-295-96033-3.
