= Siege of Berat =

Siege of Berat may refer to:

- Siege of Berat (1280–1281), by Angevin forces against the Byzantine garrison
- Siege of Berat (1455), by the Albanian forces of the League of Lezhë, against the Ottomans.
- Capture of Berat (1914), by Northern Epirote forces against pro-Ottoman Albanian rebels
