= Battle of Oranik =

Battle of Oranik may refer to:

- Battle of Oranik (1448), part of the Albanian-Venetian War of 1447-1448
- Battle of Oranik (1456), part of the Ottoman-Albanian Wars
