= Altisferi =

Altisferi is a surname. Notable people with the surname include:

- Lekë Zaharia Altisferi (died 1444), Albanian lord in Scutari
- Vrana Altisferi (died 1458), general and counselor of Skanderbeg
