= Albulena =

- Gender: Feminine
- Language: Albanian

Origin
- Origin: Albanian
- Region of origin: Southeastern Europe

Other names
- Nickname: Lena Albu
- Popularity: see popular names

Albulena is an Albanian feminine first name. The name comes from the Battle of Albulena in 1457, in which Albanian national hero Skanderbeg won a famous victory over a much larger Ottoman force. It is not a common name and is only in the top 1000 of names for a baby girl. According to devorname.com the name is most common in Kosovo with 2812, followed by Sweden with 116 people and Albania with 87 people.

== People ==
- Albulena Balaj-Halimaj, Kosovo-Albanian politician and NISMA member
- Albulena Haxhiu (born 1987), Kosovar Albanian politician of the party Vetëvendosje!, from Pristina
- Albulena Kryeziu (born 1986), Albanian actress
- Albulena Ukaj, Albanian singer
- Albulena Hulaj, Kosovar Albanian fashion designer, from Prizren
