= Siege of Svetigrad =

1448 Ottoman capture of Svetigrad

Siege of Svetigrad Rrethimi i Sfetigradit
- Part of the Albanian–Ottoman Wars (1432–1479)
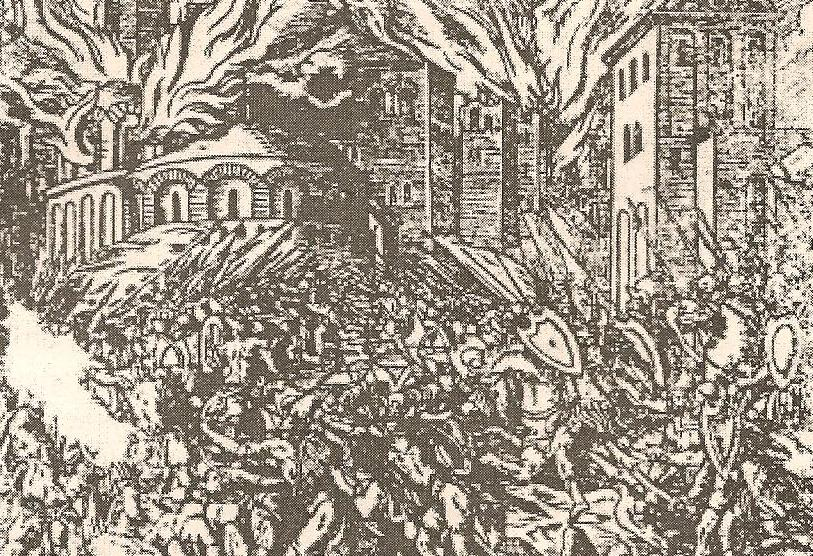
- Engraving of an engagement during the siege of Svetigrad
| Date | 14 May – 31 July 1448 |
| Location | Svetigrad (modern-day Kodžadžik, North Macedonia) 41°27′N 20°36′E |
| Result | Ottoman victory |

Belligerents
| League of Lezhë | Ottoman Empire |

Commanders and leaders
| Skanderbeg; Pjetër Perlati | (Ottoman Empire) Murad II (Ottoman Empire) Mehmed II |

Strength
| 12,000 | 15,000 (modern estimates) |

Casualties and losses
| 900 dead 1,000 wounded | 900 |
- Location within North Macedonia

The siege of Svetigrad or Sfetigrad (Albanian: Rrethimi i Sfetigradit) began on 14 May 1448 when an Ottoman army, led by Sultan Murad II, besieged the fortress of Svetigrad (now Kodžadžik, North Macedonia). After the many failed Ottoman expeditions into Albania against the League of Lezhë, a confederation of Albanian Principalities created in 1444 and headed by Skanderbeg, Murad II decided to march an army into Skanderbeg's dominions in order to capture the key Albanian fortress of Svetigrad. The fortress lay on an important route between present-day North Macedonia and Albania, and thus its occupation would give the Ottomans easy access into Albania.

At the same time, Skanderbeg had been at war with Venice. Realizing the magnitude of his challenge, Skanderbeg attempted to relieve the garrison by engaging in skirmishes with the Ottoman army. His forces succeeded in inflicting heavy casualties on the Turkish forces through guerrilla-style attacks. Efforts were made by Skanderbeg to use intelligence forces, operating as far as Constantinople, to gather information on Murad's plans of action. Meanwhile, near Scutari, he had been able to defeat a Venetian force and managed to considerably weaken the Venetian presence in Albania. Despite these efforts, on 31 July the garrison of Svetigrad surrendered due to a disruption in the water supply. The garrison was spared and a force of Ottoman Janissaries was stationed inside the fortress instead. Two years later, Murad would march against Krujë, only to suffer a heavy defeat.

== Prelude ==
In 1444 the major princes of the Albanian Principalities, which up to that point had been vassals of the Ottoman Empire, united and formed the League of Lezhë, an anti-Ottoman confederacy under Skanderbeg's lead. As a result, the Ottoman Empire sought to crush the League and re-establish control over Albania. As of 1448, all Ottoman expeditions into Albania had failed and Murad II chose to lead a force in person into Albanian territory and fragment the League. The sultan decided to capture the fortress of Svetigrad. This fortress served the strategic purpose of protecting the Albanian eastern frontier, while also allowing the Albanians to launch their own assaults on Ottoman territory. In late 1447, war began between Venice and the League, but had not yet escalated into full-scale conflict. Skanderbeg had declared war on Venice as a result of a diplomatic impasse. This left him open to invasion from the East.

Nevertheless, Murad marched his army into Monastir. Skanderbeg urgently called for material aid from Venice. The answer, however, was negative. Instead, the only aid received came from the Neapolitans and the Ragusans. Nonetheless, Murad soon marched into Ohrid and Black Drin valley, traveling near Svetigrad. In response, Skanderbeg strengthened the garrisons of Krujë, Stellushi, Svetigrad, and Berat by ordering the populations around these fortress to take up arms.

Shortly before the Ottoman siege began, Skanderbeg positioned himself, and 4,000 cavalry, 7 miles (11 km) from the Turkish camp. The force also included 8,000 other soldiers. Skanderbeg ordered that no campfires should be lit in order to keep his position secret. Moisi Arianit Golemi and Muzaka of Angelina were ordered, with thirty horsemen, to dress as peasants and enter the fortress. The plot was discovered, however, and the company was attacked, but the attackers were driven off. Upon returning to the main Ottoman camp, one of the commanding pashas saw that this was one of Skanderbeg's plots and sent 4,000 horsemen to find out where Skanderbeg was camping by following Moisi's band. Moisi led the Ottoman force into a valley, and Skanderbeg, who was ready for such an enterprise, surrounded the valley with his forces. When the Ottoman force was within distance, the Albanians sprung the ambush and the Ottoman force was annihilated. This happened on 14 May 1448, after which Murad ordered the siege to begin.

== Siege ==
=== Ottoman arrival ===
Murad's force contained approximately 80,000 men and two cannons, which could fire 200 pounds (91 kg) balls. His army contained a fresh corps of Janissaries, and 3,000 debtors and bankrupts fighting to regain their freedom. The Count of Gurrica persuaded Skanderbeg to incorporate a scorched earth strategy, by destroying all supplies that might be used by the Ottoman army. The Ottoman force paraded around the fortress and offered 300,000 aspras (Turkish currency) to those who would open the gate and let the Ottoman army in the fortress without a fight. The heralds proposing these offers went into the fortress at night time and the garrison commanders gave them a splendid dinner, so that they would get the impression that the enemy was well prepared for a lengthy siege. After the dinner their offers were rejected and they were sent back to the Sultan. The size of the Ottoman army troubled Skanderbeg because of the effects it could have on the morale of his soldiers and on the local population which supported the princes. Skanderbeg thus moved from village to village, disguised as a common soldier, and invoked the fighting spirit of the population. As a result of this activity, the local chieftains agreed to fight the Ottomans and persuaded Skanderbeg to draw up his plans in concert with theirs.

=== Albanian guerrilla attacks ===
To relieve the garrison of Svetigrad, Skanderbeg continually harassed the Ottoman army. Many of these attacks had been surprise ambushes of isolated Ottoman forces. Hoping to evade Ottoman patrols, Skanderbeg moved towards the Ottoman camp. On 22 June Skanderbeg led a night attack on the Ottoman camp which disillusioned the Ottoman soldiers who had been expecting a quiet campaign. Soon after, when the besiegers were taking their afternoon naps, Skanderbeg sent Moses with some men, again dressed as peasants, inside the Ottoman camp to reconnoiter for a future assault. Skanderbeg spoke to his troops, encouraging them not to take booty from the camp as this might give the Ottoman forces time to react and launch a counterattack. That night, the Albanians launched their attack, but the noise of the armor and the neighing of the horses inhibited a complete surprise. The periphery of the camp was thrown into confusion, but the bulk of the Turkish troops gathered and organized themselves, pushing the Albanians out of the camp but not before suffering heavy casualties. To prevent further attacks of this sort, Murad detached a contingent of troops under Firuz Pasha to watch the Albanians but it was prone to desertion and thoroughly destroyed with its baggage train being captured. A breach in the walls of Svetigrad was made, but the following infantry assault was repulsed. The Albanians began to hope that the sultan would now be returning to Edirne.

=== Stalemate ===
The fighting had reached a stalemate and Murad contemplated his next move. He was advised to pillage the countryside, but the surrounding fields had already been burned by Skanderbeg. The sultan decided to stop chasing bodies of men into the forests to prevent further casualties. Mehmed, Murad's son, proposed leaving Svetigrad to strike at Krujë. Murad sternly rejected this, reasoning that the supplies to take Svetigrad would have been wasted and that Krujë would be more strongly defended than Svetigrad. The sultan thus decided to remain at Svetigrad in an attempt to starve the garrison into submission. Meanwhile, the garrison under the leadership of Peter Perlati made several successful sorties against the Ottomans, in order to ease the encirclement and strengthen his soldiers' morale.

=== Surrender of the fortress ===
While campaigning against Venetian forces, Skanderbeg managed to inflict a serious defeat on 23 July 1448, seriously weakening Venetian power in Albania. The siege of Svetigrad continued, however, and Marin Barleti writes that the Ottomans bribed a soldier to throw a dead dog into the well of the fortress, forcing the garrison to refuse to drink out of it. It is more likely, however, that the Ottomans had cut off the water supply and induced the garrison to surrender. Given the circumstance, Perlati promised a surrender if the garrison were allowed a safe passage through the Ottoman lines. Prince Mehmed suggested that the garrison should be promised safe passage and then massacred, but Murad rejected his son's proposal, in fear that the rebellion would only be intensified through such an act; he decided to instead return the garrisoning force to Skanderbeg. On 31 July 1448 the garrison of Svetigrad surrendered.

== Aftermath ==
Perlati and his soldiers came to Skanderbeg, begging for mercy. Skanderbeg pardoned his soldiers for the surrender and even thanked them for holding out for as long as they did. Skanderbeg continued to shadow the Ottoman army as it headed back home in the hopes of dealing some serious damage, but his forces were not strong enough to risk provoking them. In October of the same year, Murad managed to inflict a serious a defeat on John Hunyadi's forces in Kosovo. Skanderbeg had planned to join Hunyadi's offensive with 20,000 men, but he was not able to get there in time due to Đurađ Branković blocking the roads to Kosovo.

The loss of Svetigrad allowed the Ottomans easy access into Albania from the northeast. They could now launch three coordinated invasions from south, southeast, and northeast into Albania. A few weeks after the siege, Mustafa Pasha led 15,000 men into Albania, as requested by Skanderbeg's Venetian rivals, only to be heavily defeated with Mustafa being captured. Skanderbeg tried to regain Svetigrad the next year, but he did not have the proper artillery to do so. He surrounded the fortress, but he realized that his position was hopeless and lifted the siege. In early 1450, the Turks would take Berat through a night-time stratagem and later that same year, Murad would besiege Krujë

== Sources ==
- Franco, Demetrio (1539), Comentario de le cose de' Turchi, et del S. Georgio Scanderbeg, principe d' Epyr, Altobello Salkato, ISBN 99943-1-042-9
- Frashëri, Kristo (2002), Gjergj Kastrioti Skënderbeu: jeta dhe vepra, 1405–1468 (in Albanian), Botimet Toena, ISBN 99927-1-627-4
- Noli, Fan Stilian (1947), George Castroiti Scanderbeg (1405–1468), International Universities Press, OCLC 732882
- Schmitt, Oliver Jens (2009), Skënderbeu, K&B Tiranë, ISBN 978-99956-667-5-0
