= Siege of Krujë (1450) =

First siege of Krujë

First siege of Krujë Rrethimi i parë i Krujës
- Part of the Albanian–Ottoman Wars (1432–1479)
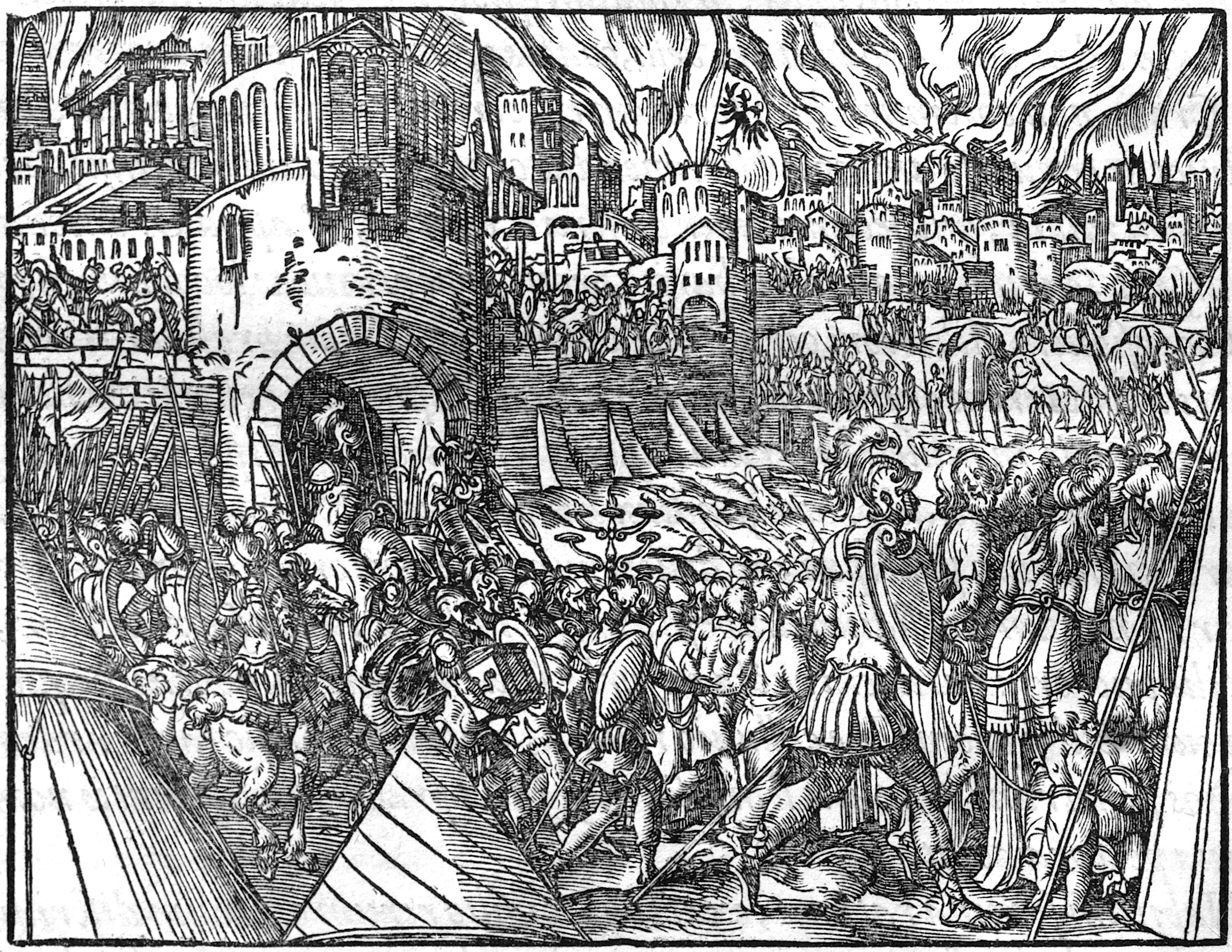
- The first siege of Krujë by Jost Amman (1578)
Date	14 May 1450
Location	Krujë, Albania 41°30′27″N 19°47′42″E
Result	Albanian victory

Belligerents
League of Lezhë	Ottoman Empire

Commanders and leaders
Skanderbeg; Vrana Konti	(Ottoman Empire) Murad II (Ottoman Empire) Mehmed II

Strength
15,000	Tens of thousands

Casualties and losses
Unknown	Unknown

The first siege of Krujë (Albanian: Rrethimi i parë i Krujës) occurred in 1450 when an Ottoman army led by Sultan Murad II and his crown prince Mehmed II tried to besiege the Albanian town of Krujë. The League of Lezhë, led by Skanderbeg, experienced low morale after losing Svetigrad and Berat between 1448 and 1450. Nevertheless, Skanderbeg's exhortations and the support of the clergy, who claimed to have had visions of angels and victory, motivated the Albanians to defend the capital of the League, Krujë, at all costs. After leaving a protective garrison of 4,000 men under his trusted lieutenant Vrana Konti (also known as Kont Urani), Skanderbeg harassed the Ottoman camps around Krujë and attacked the supply caravans of Sultan Murad II's army. By September, the Ottoman camp was in disarray as morale sank and disease ran rampant. The Ottoman army acknowledged that the castle of Krujë would not fall by strength of arms, lifted the siege, and made its way to Edirne. Soon thereafter, in the winter of 1450–51, Murad died in Edirne and was succeeded by his son, Mehmed II.

== Campaigns of 1448 and early 1450 ==
After several failed invasions of Albania by Ottoman captains, Murad II laid siege to the fortress of Svetigrad (which is thought to be today's Demir Hisar) on May 14, 1448, with a force of 80,000 men. Svetigrad was an important strategic point since it controlled the routes from Macedonia into Albania. The small garrison, composed of Albanians, Bulgarians, and other Europeans held the fortress while Scanderbeg attacked the Ottoman camp from outside. After the Ottomans poisoned the wells, a group of defenders decided to open the gates and let the Turks in, thus giving control of the fortress to the Ottomans. The Sultan retired from Albania, and Skanderbeg laid siege to Svetigrad on September 23, 1448. After several failed assaults, Skanderbeg lifted the siege and retreated. In early 1450, Berat was captured by the pasha of Gjirokastër through a night attack, causing Gjergj Arianit to desert Skandebeg's cause.

== Prelude ==
=== Albanian morale before the siege ===
The morale of the Albanians sank after the losses in the previous years. When the Turks began marching towards Krujë on April 5, 1450, the people claimed to have seen cherubims and angels flying over Albania. Skanderbeg himself claimed that he had received a vision of St. George handing him a flaming sword to "destroy the enemies of true religion (Christianity)." This speech, along with many other visions of the clergy, raised Albanians' morale, motivating them to fight.

=== Albanian dispositions and preparations ===
Before the siege began, Skanderbeg exited Krujë with 8,000 men—among whom were many Slavs, Italians, Frenchmen, and Germans. 2,000 of these were infantry and 6,000 were cavalry. Skanderbeg found Mount Tumenishta (now known as Mount Skënderbeu) to be a suitable position from which to attack the Ottomans. Krujë was left with a garrison of 4,000 men under the command of Vrana Konti. Vrana had under his command several Germans, Italians, and Frenchmen, to whom he emphasized the importance of the siege and also ordered them to their positions. The total number of men led by Skanderbeg is estimated to be 15,000. Krujë had enough supplies for a sixteen-month siege. The women and children of Krujë were sent for protection to Venetian possessed cities, whereas the others were ordered to burn their crops and move into the mountains and fortresses.

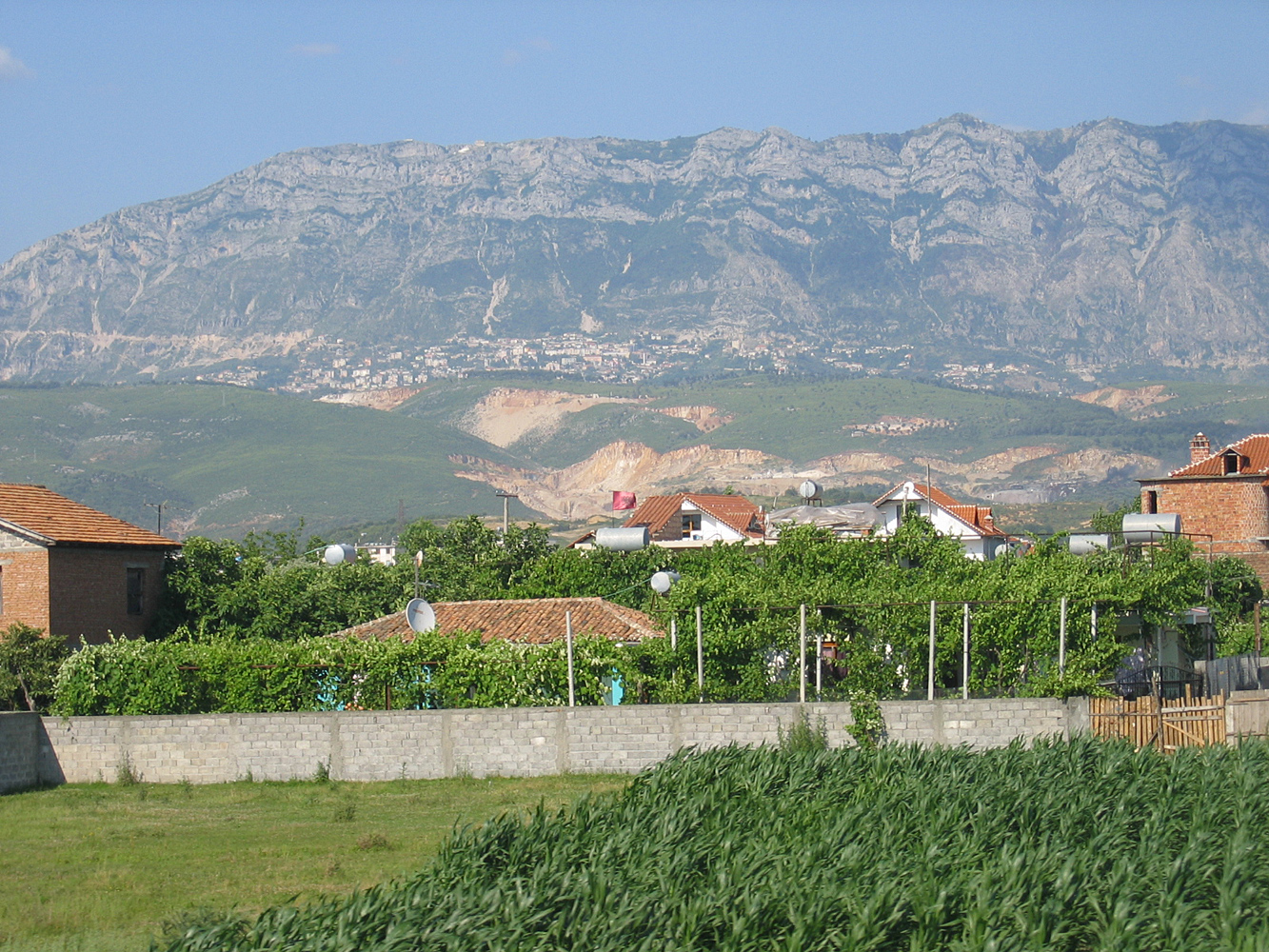
Mount Tumenishta (Skënderbeu) as seen from Fushë-Krujë

=== Ottoman dispositions and preparations ===
According Edward Gibbon, Murad reached Krujë on May 14 with approximately 100,000 of his best soldiers (60,000 of which was cavalry). Though, modern estimates have concluded the total number of Ottomans led by Murad was in the tens of thousands. Murad proposed to Vrana that he should hand over the fortress, but Vrana refused. After receiving the refusal, Murad set his army to cast ten cannons, one of which could fire rocks weighing 400 pounds and another 200 pounds. Despite the firepower, the Turkish firing positions were at a disadvantage, since Krujë "was almost part of the mountain which it had been built." The cannons could fire two or three times a day and were not accurate. Two large and four smaller guns were placed on the Tirana side, and the remainder were aimed at the main gateway.

== Siege ==
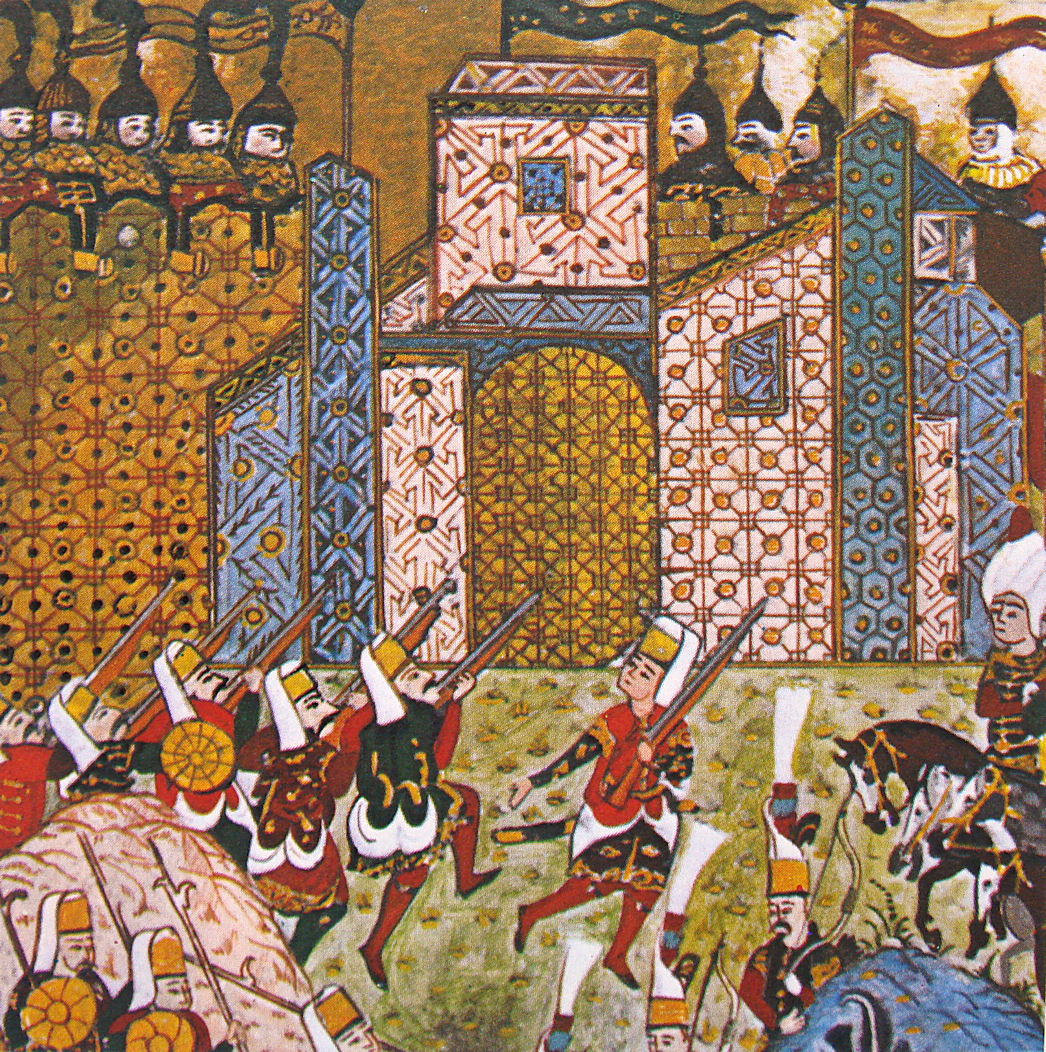
Ottoman Janissaries during a siege

=== First phase ===
Murad fired on Krujë for four days until a breach was finally made. The Sultan believed that he had the advantage and ordered his troops through the walls. The garrison managed to push the assault back, thus gaining time to repair the walls. Murad, fearing a counterattack from Skanderbeg, sent a scouting patrol towards the surrounding mountains to watch for an attack. Skanderbeg still managed to lead, at dusk, a raid on the Turkish encampment, killing several hundred men, capturing and destroying Turkish supplies, and almost losing his own life. When Skanderbeg returned to his men, his "shield was so battered that its shape was scarce to be discerned." The raid cost Skanderbeg ten dead and even more wounded. The assault continued, however, with the guns sounding from time to time. The defenders were not facing great difficulty, however. Sixty of them sallied forth to do whatever damage they could, and those at the walls repelled all attempts to enter. The main weight of the attack had come from the Tirana side, where the Turkish losses had been heavy.

=== Second phase ===
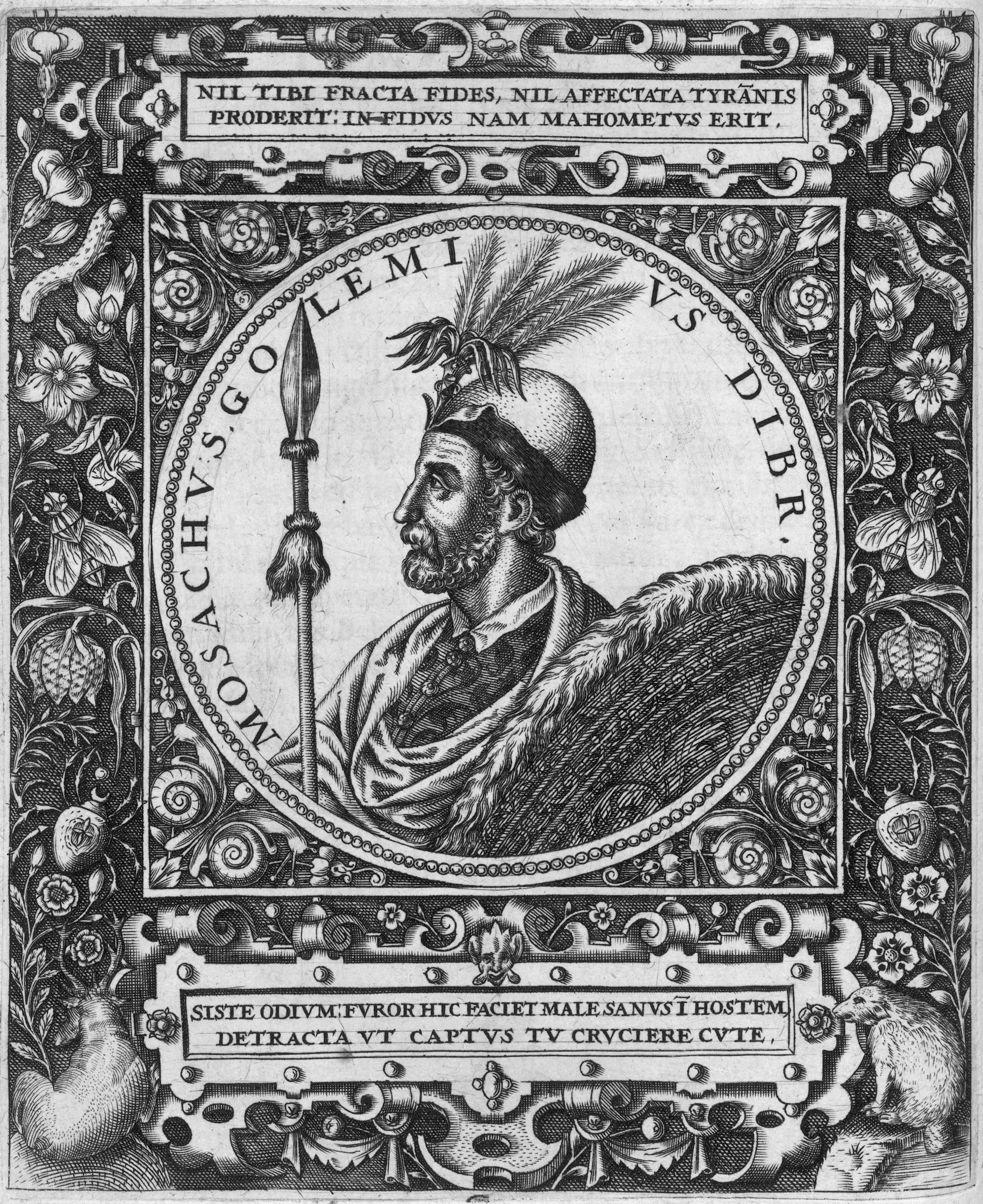
Moisi Arianit Golemi

When the second assault began, the Turks tried to break through the gate with their lances. After heavy casualties, the attackers retreated, and Murad held for the next two days a council of all his generals. An immediate precaution was to guard the camp against another surprise attack, which was responded to by placing a force of men under the command of Prince Mehmed, where the first attack had taken place. Moisi Arianit Golemi feigned an attack with about 500 horsemen: the alarm was given, and the Turks prepared for his attack. Meanwhile, Skanderbeg and his forces moved around the camp and broke in where least expected. Before an organized counterattack could be made, Skanderbeg retreated from the camp. The attacks made by Skanderbeg caused the Turks to aim some of their cannons towards the expected guerrilla forces instead of the fortress. A large force of Turkish cavalry was sent out, which Skanderbeg followed up to the mouth of the Ishëm River, until they turned back to Krujë.

While Skanderbeg had been away, a large Ottoman assault was made on Krujë from the Tirana side, but inadvertent friendly fire from the Turks forced them to call off the assault. The Ottomans then attempted to mine the fortress but could not succeed since the fortress had been built on rock. Since the food supplies were beginning to run out, the Turks received provisions from Venice, as did the Albanians. The Turkish attacks had made no headway, and the Ottoman army had lost many dead or wounded, whereas Skanderbeg's force had lost 1,000 men thus far. Moisi Golemi and Tanush Thopia raised a couple thousand more, and the force was split between the three, making attacks on the Turkish camp easier. Skanderbeg began to move towards the camp as the Turks had assembled 8,000 men, which began to move towards him. Skanderbeg slowly retired while Moisi and Tanush broke into the camp. The Turkish force sent against Skanderbeg was lured towards the foothills, and the next morning (July 25), they were surrounded and completely destroyed. The next day, Skanderbeg was seen above the rocks of Krujë, in conference with Vrana Konti, surprising Murad.

=== Final phase ===
After Vrana had returned to the castle, a pasha was chosen to have a conference with Vrana, bringing him many rich presents. The pasha tried to convince the count that Murad would be a more suitable master than Skanderbeg was and that the siege was almost over, but Vrana refused to surrender. As a result, a fresh Ottoman assault began. Meanwhile, Murad sent an envoy trying to convince Skanderbeg to capitulate by offering 10,000 crowns annually. Skanderbeg also refused replying: "Nay if Murad did divide with me and make me co-partner with all his empire, I would never suffer the name of Albania to be stained and blemished with this blot of disgrace and infamy." The assault continued, and the Albanian positions seemed desperate. On October 14, Skanderbeg offered Krujë to the Venetians, threatening to capitulate the fortress to the Turks if they did not accept it. After Murad lifted the siege on October 26, because of the arriving winter, the Venetians replied to Skanderbeg's offer rejecting it and offered to help Skanderbeg to harmonize his relationship with Ottomans.

== Aftermath ==
Skanderbeg's helmet on display in Vienna

The siege cost 20,000 Ottoman casualties and over 1,000 Albanian casualties. Marin Barleti claims that Murad died of disease under the fortress of Krujë, but Murad, in fact, died in Edirne in 1451. Murad began to retire from Albania out of fear of losing even more men from the Albanian winter, However, the retreat itself caused the loss of thousands of Ottoman troops due to attacks from local Albanian militias. Skanderbeg was at the end of his resources. He traveled to Ragusa, urging for assistance, and the Ragusans informed Pope Nicholas V. Through financial assistance, Skanderbeg managed to hold Krujë and regain much of his territory. Skanderbeg's success brought praise from all over Europe and ambassadors were sent to him from Rome, Naples, Hungary, and Burgundy. Skanderbeg then became a vassal of Alfonso V, on March 26, 1451, by the Treaty of Gaeta, gaining much needed men and supplies from the crown of Aragon.

According to legend, one night during the siege, Skanderbeg sent out a herd of goats with a candle on each of the goats' horns. The encamped Turks believed it to be an Albanian attack and made a movement against the herd. When the Turks advanced far enough, Skanderbeg launched an attack against the force, destroying it. After the siege was lifted, Skanderbeg commemorated his victory by designing a helmet with the head of a goat on it, as a reference to his "ingenious tactics" used that night.

== Legacy ==
Naim Frashëri, a prominent Albanian poet, wrote of how the siege of Krujë had saved Europe from Ottoman invasion. Today, Albanians take pride in the actions performed during the siege. The Skanderbeg Museum, in Krujë, has many commemorations to the siege and the 1953 film The Great Warrior Skanderbeg stages the siege. It is the setting of the novel The Siege by Albanian writer Ismail Kadare.

== Sources ==
- Setton, Kenneth Meyer (1978). The Papacy and the Levant, 1204-1571. Vol. II. Philadelphia: American Philosophical Society. ISBN 978-0-87169-127-9.
- Calic, Marie-Janine (2019). The Great Cauldron: A History of Southeastern Europe. Cambridge: Harvard University Press. ISBN 978-0-674-98392-2.
- Babinger, Franz (1978). Hickman, William C. (ed.). Mehmed the Conqueror and His Time. Translated by Manheim, Ralph. Princeton, New Jersey: Princeton University Press. ISBN 978-0-691-01078-6.
- Gibbon, Edward (1957). History of the Decline and Fall of the Roman Empire. Vol. VI. New York: P. F. Collier & Son.
- Housley, Norman (1992). The Later Crusades, 1274-1580: From Lyons to Alcazar. Vol. VI. Oxford: Oxford University Press. ISBN 978-0-19-822136-4.
- Kadare, Ismail (2010). The Siege. Translated by Bellos, David. New York: Canongate. ISBN 978-0-8021-4475-1.
