= Moisi Golemi =

Albanian nobleman and commander of the League of Lezhë

Moisi Arianiti
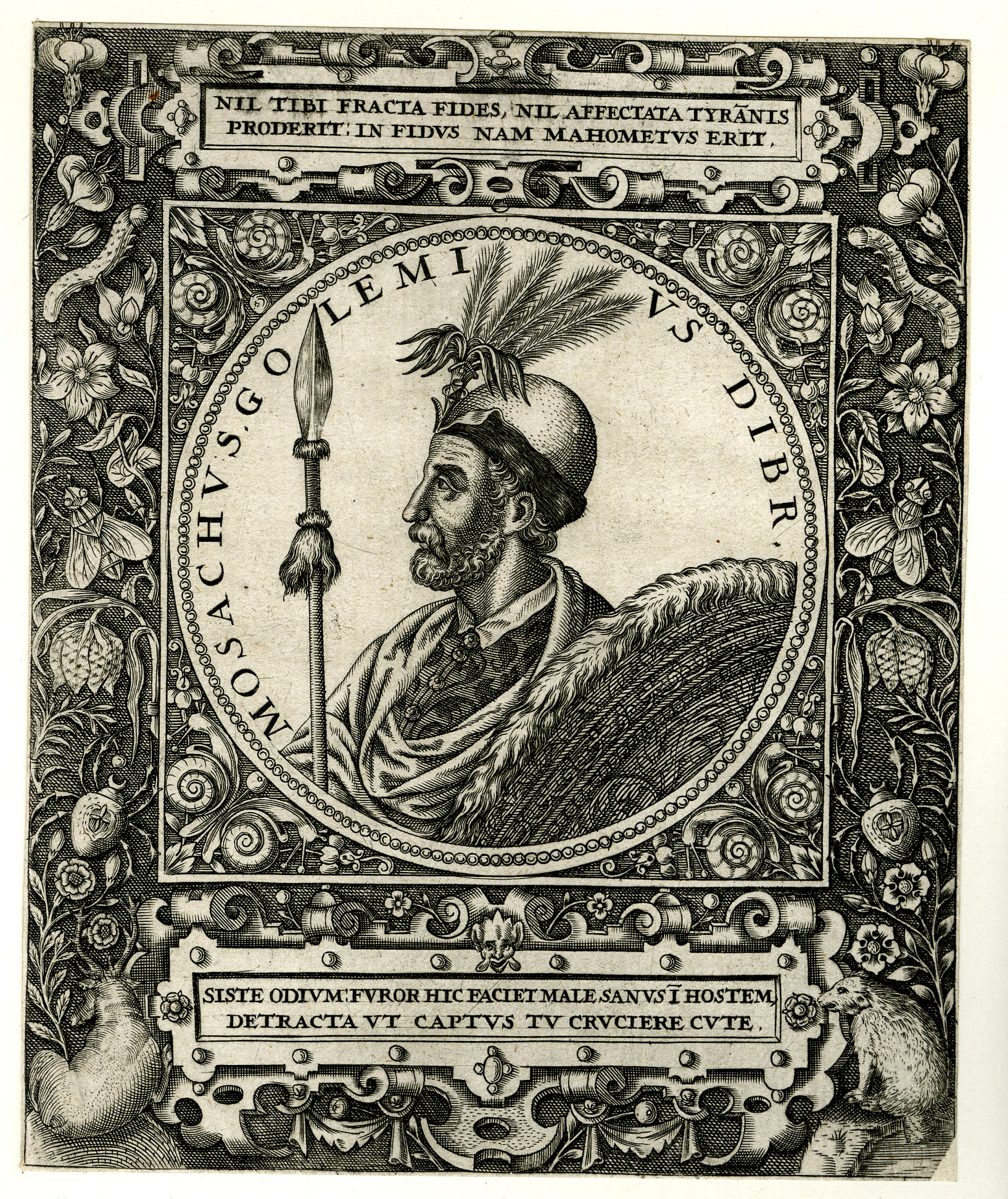
- 1596 engraving by Johann Theodor de Bry of Moisi Golemi
- Died: 1465; Constantinople, Ottoman Empire
- Noble family: Arianiti family
- Spouse: Zanfina Muzaka
- Issue: Çezar Arianiti; Despina Arianiti
- Father: Muzakë Arianiti
- Mother: Goisava

Moisi Arianiti, also known as Moisi Golemi and Moisi of Dibra (Albanian: Moisiu i Dibrës), was an Albanian nobleman and a commander of the League of Lezhë. From late 1443 until early 1444 he captured all Ottoman holdings in the Dibër region. For a brief period in the 1450s he joined the Ottomans, but soon abandoned them and returned to the League. In 1465, he was publicly executed in Constantinople after being captured by the Ottoman army at the Battle of Vajkal.

== Family ==
Born in the vicinity of modern Elbasan, he was the son of Muzakë Arianiti, son of Komnen Arianiti and brother of Gjergj Arianiti. His mother was a noblewoman named Goisava, after whom Gjergj Arianiti's second-born daughter was named. In 1445 he married Zanfina Muzaka after her divorce from Karl Muzakë Thopia, who went on to marry Skanderbeg's sister Mamica Kastrioti. The couple had two children. His son Çezar Arianiti (Cesare Comnino Arianiti) had one daughter named Giovanna Comminata, who lived in Naples and was married to patrician Paulo Brancaccio. His daughter Despina was married to Stanisha Konti, son of Vrana Konti, and had two daughters. The eldest named Andronika, became a lady-in-waiting to Christina of Denmark in Milan, and married a nobleman from the Corte family in Pavia. Their cousin-in law Francesca of Montferrat, wife of Constantine Arianiti, was Christina's chief lady-in waiting and later royal governess to her daughters. Despina's other daughter married Carlo Minutolo, with whom she had Lord Tommaso Minutolo, a nobleman in Capuana.

== League of Lezhë ==
When Skanderbeg came in Albania, Moisi quickly allied with him and became commander of the border guard. Golemi was first distinguished in the battle of Torvioll in 1444. Later he oversaw the capture of the crucial castle of Svetigrad in modern-day North Macedonia.

After the debacle of the Siege of Berat, and growing envious of the fame Skanderbeg had accumulated over the years, he betrayed his commander in chief and went over to the Ottomans. However, Albanian border troops did not follow him. Instead the command of border troops was passed to Nikollë and Dhimitër Berisha. Another view is that Skanderbeg usurped Moisi's lands in Debar leading to Moisi's betrayal.

One year later he returned at the head of a fifteen thousand men-strong army, but was promptly defeated by Skanderbeg. Skanderbeg devised a strategy against Moisi, deploying his army, which was commanded by the brothers Muzhaq Komnen Araniti and Djuric Vladan Araniti, who were the sons of Moisi's uncle, pitting the Aranites against each other, which avoided the fratricidal duel, as well as ensured the victory of his army. He retreated first to Macedonia and then to Constantinople, where he was left ignored by the Ottoman authorities. Soon thereafter, he went back to Skanderbeg, who pardoned and reinstated him. He got back the position of a commander of the Albanian border troops. According to Gjon Muzaka, it was Skanderbeg who wanted for Moisi to return and called him back, while Moisi seeing that he was not safe with the Sultan, and in order not to increase the bloodshed of the Christians returned.

Moisi devoted the rest of his life to the Albanian struggle, but in April 1465 he fell prisoner to Ballaban Badera, an Albanian-born Ottoman sanjakbey of the Sanjak of Ohrid, during the Battle of Vajkal. Dispatched hastily to Constantinople along with other Albanian princes and captains, he was then skinned alive publicly.

== Domain ==
Muzakë Arianiti's domains extended in areas of Mokër and Çermenikë. Gjon Muzaka mentions Librazhd, Qukës, Dorëz, and Gur among others as parts of his personal demesne. Apart from the areas inherited by his father Golemi was acknowledged as lord of Dibra by Skanderbeg as he led the expedition against the Ottomans in that region. Golemi's son Aranit is mentioned in contemporary sources as the lord of a barony in Çermenikë.

== Legacy ==
In Albanian folk tradition, Golemi became a popular hero mostly through the Song of Moisi Golemi (Kënga e Moisi Golemit), an epic of the Arbëreshë in southern Italy. He was described as the best general of League of Lezhë, second only to Skanderbeg.

== See also ==
Ancestors of Moisi Golemi

4. Komnen Arianiti
2. Muzakë Arianiti
10. Nikola Sakat
5. Unnamed
1. Moisi
3. Unknown

== Annotations ==
- His given name is equivalent to Moses. Janus-Jacobus Boissard called him Moises Dibriota (1596).
