= Siege of Berat (1455) =

Battle of the Ottoman wars

Siege of Berat Rrethimi i Beratit
- Part of the Albanian–Ottoman Wars (1432–1479)
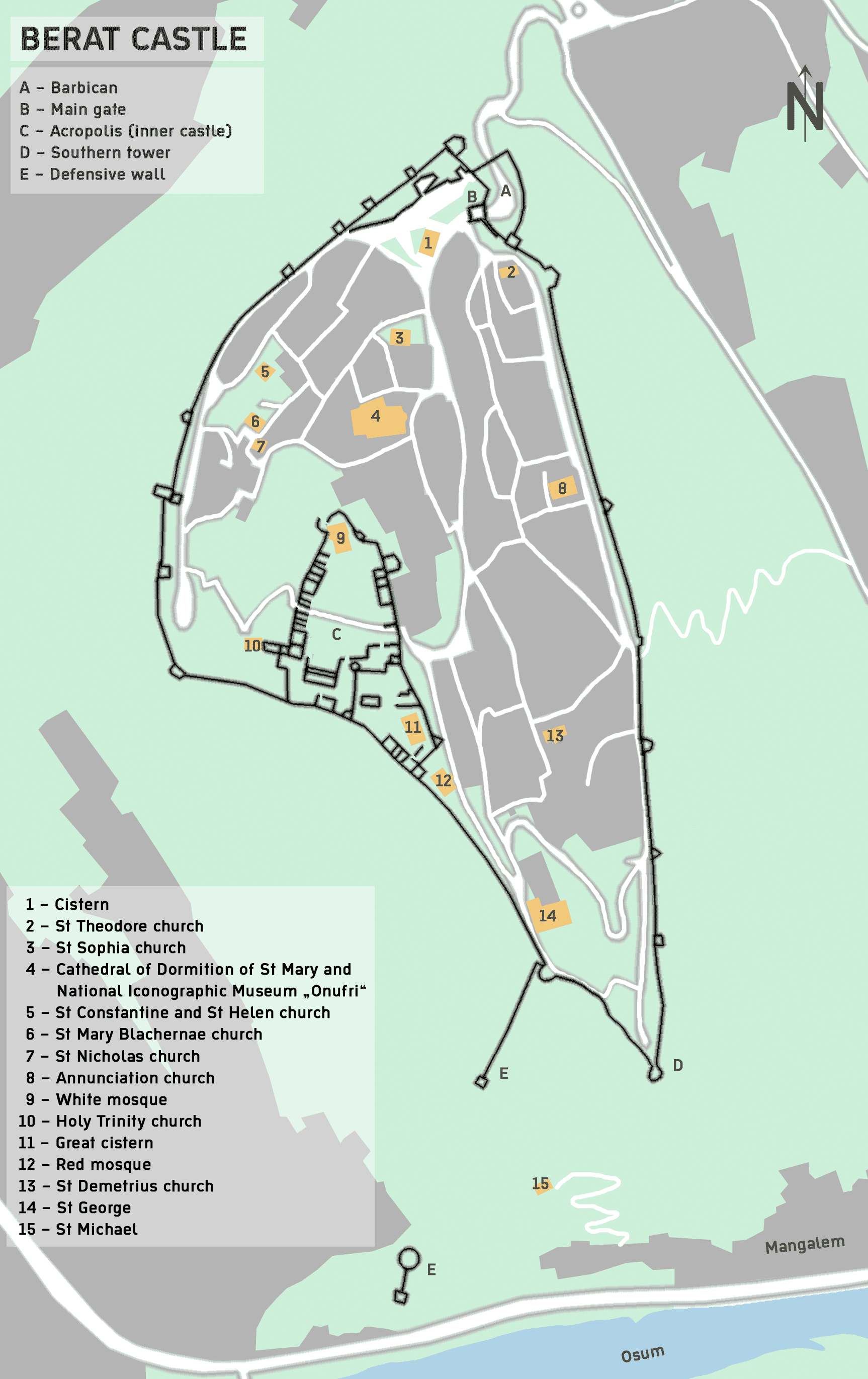
- Map of Berat Castle
Date	July 1455
Location	Berat, Ottoman Empire (present-day Albania)
Result	Ottoman victory; Moisi Arianit Golemi deserted to the Ottomans

Belligerents
League of Lezhë; Crown of Aragon	Ottoman Empire

Commanders and leaders
Skanderbeg; Gjergj Arianiti; Karl Muzakë Thopia †; Vrana Konti	Ishak Bey Hranić

Strength
14,000 men	20,000 men in the relief force

Casualties and losses
Roughly 6,000 killed, 80 prisoners	Unknown

The siege of Berat (Albanian: Rrethimi i Beratit) took place in July 1455 when the Albanian army of Skanderbeg attempted to capture the fortress in the Albanian city of Berat, which was held by Ottoman forces. The attempt resulted in a failure when an Ottoman relief army arrived and routed the besieging forces.

== Background ==
When Skanderbeg began his rebellion, Berat belonged to the Albanian prince Theodore Muzaka. When in 1449 Theodore Muzaka was dying, he sent for Skanderbeg to take over the castle in the name of the League of Lezhë. Skanderbeg sent an Albanian detachment led by Pal Kuka, to claim the castle. In the meantime a force of Ottoman soldiers came from their garrison in Gjirokastër, quietly scaled the poorly guarded walls of Berat at night, slaughtered the Albanian garrison of about 500 soldiers, hanged the dying Theodore Muzaka, and claimed the castle, while the captain Pal Kuka was later ransomed. Berat was located on an important strategic position as it controlled much of southern Albania as well as the vital supply routes leading to southern Macedonia and Greece.

== Siege ==
Skanderbeg and his forces besieged the Ottoman-occupied castle and began pounding it with the help of the Aragonese-Neapolitan artillery. The commander of the Ottoman garrison then proposed to hand over the city if no reinforcements would come for a month. Believing the situation was well in hand and that the castle would fall, Skanderbeg left with a sizable contingent of his army in the direction of Vlorë. Although he tutored his commanders, Skanderbeg could never bring them up to his level of knowledge in military affairs. His formal training and experience in Anatolia and his service with the Ottoman army proved to be valuable for the Albanian resistance against the Ottomans.

At the head of the remaining force he left Karl Muzakë Thopia, his brother-in-law, since Berat was formerly a possession of Muzaka's family. After a successful bombardment, the Ottoman commander of the garrison agreed to turn over the keys to the castle if the sultan had not sent reinforcements within a certain amount of time. This was a ploy to fool the Albanian forces into a false sense of security and delay any actions, giving reinforcements time to arrive.

=== Battle ===
The sultan sent an army of 20,000 troops led by Ishak Bey Hranić. The reinforcements surprised the Albanian army in mid-July, 1455. Only one Albanian commander, Vrana Konti (Kont Urani), managed to resist the initial Ottoman onslaught and pushed back several attacking waves. His efforts were not able to change the course of the battle, however, and the Albanian army degenerated into a total rout.

Around 6,000 of Skanderbeg's men died, including 800 men of a 1,000-man-strong contingent of Neapolitans from Alphonso V as experts in demolition, artillery, and siege warfare. The commander of the siege, Muzakë Thopia, also died during the conflict.

== Aftermath ==
Skanderbeg himself was not at the battle, having moved southwest to inspect the routes to Vlorë and hinder a potential surprise attack from the garrison there. Upon hearing the news, he rushed back, but by the time of his arrival the battle was already over. Italian chronicles of the time describe Skanderbeg as performing feats of bravery “with sword and mace” and that many owed their life to his opportune intervention. The results at Berat were disastrous and badly crippled the Albanian resistance for a time. Berat remained in the hands of the Ottomans and was never again to be taken by the League.
