= John Van Antwerp Fine Jr. =

American historian (1939–2026)

John Van Antwerp Fine Jr. Professor Emeritus
- Born: September 9, 1939; Princeton, New Jersey, U.S.
- Died: July 6, 2026 (aged 86); Ann Arbor, Michigan, U.S.
- Occupation: Professor of history
- Awards: Guggenheim Fellowship for Humanities, US & Canada

Academic background
- Education: Harvard University

Academic work
- Discipline: Balkan and Byzantine history
- Sub-discipline: Medieval Bosnia, Bosnian Church
- Institutions: University of Michigan
- Notable students: Anthony Kaldellis

John Van Antwerp Fine Jr. (September 9, 1939 – July 6, 2026) was an American historian and author. He was professor emeritus of Balkan and Byzantine history at the University of Michigan and wrote extensively on the subject.

== Early life and education ==
John Van Antwerp Fine Jr. was born in Princeton, New Jersey on September 9, 1939, to a family of educators. His father, John V. A. Fine (1903–1987), was Professor of Greek History in the Classics Department of Princeton University, and his grandfather, John Burchard Fine, founded Princeton Preparatory Schools, while his granduncle, Henry Burchard Fine, was a dean and professor of mathematics at Princeton. His mother, Elizabeth Bunting Fine, was also a classicist and taught Latin and Greek at Miss Fine's School, founded by his grandaunt.

Fine Jr.'s undergraduate and graduate training was at Harvard University, where he studied Byzantium, the Balkans, and medieval Russia. He earned his Ph.D. from Harvard in 1968 and began teaching at the University of Michigan in 1969.

== Career and academic interests ==
Medievalist Paul Stephenson, lead professor at the School of History and Heritage, University of Lincoln, and a Fellow of the Royal Historical Society, compared Fine's work to the likes of Paul M. Barford, Simon Franklin, Jonathan Shepard.

His academic interests ranged from theology and the history of Christianity to Byzantium and the medieval and modern Balkans. His publications have become standard in the field, notably his surveys of the Medieval Balkans (1983 and 1987). In 1998, John V. A. Fine Jr. retired from Michigan, becoming a professor emeritus.

=== Bosnian history and Bosnian Church ===
Fine revolutionized the way scholars understand the Bosnian Church (first published in 1975; republished in England in 2006), showing that it was not heretical.

He also contributed to the understanding of Bosnian history, working to correct popular misconceptions, especially during the Balkan wars of the 1990s. He co-authored Bosnia and Hercegovina: A Tradition Betrayed with former student Robert J. Donia (1994), a work published in England, the US, and in Bosnian translation in war-time Sarajevo (1995). He traveled to and lectured in the besieged cities of Sarajevo and Mostar during the war.

=== Pre-modern identity of Croatians ===
In 2006, Fine published a study of notions of ethnicity in Croatia from the medieval period to the nineteenth century titled When Ethnicity Did Not Matter in the Balkans. In 2008, Emily Greble Balić, a professor of history at Vanderbilt University, whose specialization is East European History, Minorities in Europe and Yugoslavia, gave a positive review stating that "(o)ne of the book's great strengths is Fine's analysis of premodern "ethnic" identity, which he convincingly demonstrates to have existed, though in different forms". In 2009, John K. Cox of North Dakota State University reviewed it largely positively, noting some points of criticism. James P. Krokar of DePaul University, 2009 review of the book was also positive, stating that the book is "extremely important" addition to "South Slavic history, and to the debate on the modernity of the nation." The same year, Neven Budak of the University of Zagreb gave a mixed review, noting both some positive and negative aspects. On the negative side, Budak complained alleging "ideological prejudices" and "preconceived conclusions". He claimed that "the author did not prepare methodologically, nor did he become acquainted with the relevant works of non-Croatian authors", that Fine's approach to the topic "contrary to stated intentions - is traditionalist in its method, superficial and unreliable", alleging inappropriate "attitude towards Croats".

== Death ==
Fine died on July 6, 2026, at the age of 86.

== Works ==
- Fine, John Van Antwerp Jr. (2005). When Ethnicity did not Matter in the Balkans: A Study of Identity in Pre-Nationalist Croatia, Dalmatia, and Slavonia in the Medieval and Early-Modern Periods. Ann Arbor, Michigan: University of Michigan Press. ISBN 0472025600.
- Fine, John Van Antwerp Jr. (2000). "The Slavic Saint Jerome: An Entertainment". Cultures and Nations of Central and Eastern Europe: Essays in Honor of Roman Szporluk. Cambridge, Massachusetts: Ukrainian Research Institute. pp. 101–112. ISBN 9780916458935.
- Fine, John Van Antwerp Jr. (2002). "The Various Faiths in the History of Bosnia: Middle Ages to the Present". Islam and Bosnia: Conflict Resolution and Foreign Policy in Multi-Ethnic States. Montreal & Kingston: McGill-Queen's University Press. pp. 3–23. ISBN 9780773524132.
- Donia, Robert J.; Fine, John Van Antwerp Jr. (1994). Bosnia and Hercegovina: A Tradition Betrayed. New York: Columbia University Press. ISBN 9781850652120.
- Fine, John Van Antwerp Jr. (1994) [1987]. The Late Medieval Balkans: A Critical Survey from the Late Twelfth Century to the Ottoman Conquest. Ann Arbor, Michigan: University of Michigan Press. ISBN 0472082604.
  - Fine, John Van Antwerp Jr. (1987). The Late Medieval Balkans: A Critical Survey from the Late Twelfth Century to the Ottoman Conquest. Ann Arbor, Michigan: University of Michigan Press.
- Fine, John Van Antwerp Jr. (1991) [1983]. The Early Medieval Balkans: A Critical Survey from the Sixth to the Late Twelfth Century. Ann Arbor, Michigan: University of Michigan Press.
  - Fine, John Van Antwerp Jr. (1983). The Early Medieval Balkans: A Critical Survey from the Sixth to the Late Twelfth Century. Ann Arbor, Michigan: University of Michigan Press. ISBN 9780472100255.
- Fine, John Van Antwerp Jr. (2007) [1975]. The Bosnian Church: Its Place in State and Society from the Thirteenth to the Fifteenth Century. London: Saqi Books. ISBN 9780863565038.
  - Fine, John Van Antwerp Jr. (1975). The Bosnian Church: A New Interpretation: A Study of the Bosnian Church and Its Place in State and Society from the 13th to the 15th Centuries. Boulder: East European Quarterly. ISBN 9780914710035.

== See also ==
- History of Bosnia and Herzegovina
- Dubravko Lovrenović
- Florin Curta
- Tibor Živković
