= Ukrainian Research Institute of Archival Affairs and Records Keeping =

- Interactive map of Ukrainian Research Institute of Archival Affairs and Records Keeping
- 50.46457406480896°N 30.495259095974042°E
- Alternative name: Український науково-дослідний інститут архівної справи та документознавства
- Location: Kyiv, Ukraine
- Established: 1 November 1994
- Website: https://undiasd.archives.gov.ua/en/index.php

The Ukrainian Research Institute of Archival Affairs and Records Keeping (URIAARK) (Ukrainian: Український науково-дослідний інститут архівної справи та документознавства, УНДІАСД) is an archival institution in Kyiv. The Ukrainian Research Institute of Archival Affairs and Records Keeping is a state research budget institution in the system of state archives of Ukraine, and is subordinated to the State Archival Service of Ukraine. The main objective of the institute is setting and solving scientific, theoretical, normative and methodological problems connected with the development of archival affairs and record keeping.

== History of URIAARK ==
The Institute began to function under orders from Chief of Archival Administration under the Cabinet of Ministers of Ukraine, 1 November 1994, number 45 on the basis of the Verkhovna Rada of Ukraine of 24 December 1993 No. 3815-XII “On the Order of bringing into force the Law of Ukraine “On National Archival Fond and Archival Institutions” and Resolution of Cabinet of Ministers of Ukraine on 16 May 1994 No. 311 “On founding in Kyiv the Ukrainian State Research Institute of Archival Affairs and Record Keeping”. Components of the institute were: department of archives studies with archival history and theory of archives sectors, conservation of documents, National archive fund formation, research and reference system and accounting documents; records department; research and information department.

In 1998 to improve management institute and rational frame the structure was reorganized as follows: department of history and theory of archives, department of physical and chemical research, department of theory and technology of national archive fund, department of scientific and help staff and accounting documents, the department documentation, scientific information department with scientific and technical information sector. In January 2002 the current structure of the institute was established. In 2001, because of the reorganisation of the name of the Institute, the term "State" was removed.

In April 2003, according to the order of Certifying Board of the Ministry of Education and Science of Ukraine from 02.28.2003, the (protocol number 112) in the institute is open department of postgraduate distance learning, speciality 07.00.06 - historiography, and special historical disciplines, and in November 2004 at the graduate speciality was opened 07.00.01 - History of Ukraine (Ministry of Education and Science of Ukraine from 01.11.2004, No. 834). For both specialities graduated seven students and continues to study five graduate students.

In May 2003 under the Ministry of Education and Science of Ukraine of May 22, 2003 No. 265, according to the resolution of the Presidium of the Supreme Attestation Commission of Ukraine on May 21, 2003 No. 3-11/5 the Institute established a specialized academic council K 26.864 .01 with the right of consideration and protection of theses for the degree of candidate of historical sciences specialities: 07.00.06 - historiography, and special historical disciplines, 27.00.02 - Documents and Archives. During this period, Specialized Academic Council defended 44 thesis for the degree of candidate of historical sciences.

The Institute researchers conducted more than 170 scientific and teaching materials including the manuals, guides, industry and government standards, rules, orders, regulations, industry standards, guidelines, analytical reviews and so forth. Together with the State Committee on Archives of Ukraine, archival institutions, academic institutions and other organizations 26 scientific conferences, readings, seminars, round tables were conducted. Among them, the international scientific conference "Ukrainian Archives: Current Status and Perspectives," Archival and library science in Ukraine struggle for liberation era (1917-1921 biennium), "Archives - part of information resources", "Archives and Area Studies: Ways of integration", "Current state and prospects of Documentation", "Archives Studies as science" and scientific and practical seminar on "Archival ucrainica: search, registration and acquisition of archives". Institute launched Issue 5 periodicals and publications, 2 of which (the annual "Studies of Archives and Records" and archaeographical annual "Interests") are included to scientific professional publications in Ukraine, which can publish results of dissertations for the degree doctoral degrees. Among the Institute staff - 3 doctors and 16 candidates. 2 employees with academic rank of professor, 5 - Senior Scientist, 3 - Associate Professor.

The staff of the institute is noted by the Cabinet Council of Ukraine and the Ukrainian Union of Ethnographers Gratitude (2004). Employees of the institute were awarded with certificates of honor and gratitude of the State Committee on Archives of Ukraine, Ministry of Education and Science of Ukraine, the Ministry of Culture and Tourism of Ukraine, Kyiv city and Solomensky district administrations.

== Structure of URIAARK ==
The structure is as follows:

- Administration
- Department of Archival Studies
  - Sector of reference and accounting documents
- Department of physical, chemical and biological researches
- Records management department
- Research and information department
  - Sector of scientific and technical information

== Principal activities of URIAARK ==
- development of theoretical and applied problems of Archival Studies;
- regulatory, organizational, methodological and information-analytical support of state archival institutions of the State Committee on Archives of Ukraine;
- coordination of scientific activities of the state archival institutions in Ukraine;
- international cooperation with relevant institutions and organizations;
- training of scientific personnel for the archival field;
- preparation of materials for production of periodic and aperiodic publications of archive science and other special historical science;
- conferences, symposia, seminars, including international;
- participation in the formation and content of training and expertise of training professionals in the field of archives, records and record keeping.

== URIAARK Postgraduate program ==
Since February 28, 2003 in the Ukrainian Research Institute Archives and Records opened postgraduate specialty 07.00.06 - historiography, and special historical disciplines, and from November 1, 2004, opened a specialty 07.00.01 - History of Ukraine. Opening of the graduate program provides a complete system of multilevel training of scientific personnel for the archival field, qualitative growth of archival education in universities of different levels of accreditation, supporting the state archival institutions with highly qualified scientific personnel. Activities are regulated by Regulations of the postgraduate training of scientific and pedagogical staff (Cabinet Resolution on 01.03.1999 No. 309) The institute has two departments - Archival Studies and Documentation, Research is closely linked to sectors of the Postgraduate program.

== Print media of URIAARK ==
- Scientific annual of "Studio from the archived business and documentation" (original name – «Студії з архівної справи та документознавства»)
- Archaeography annual "Sights" (original name – «Пам’ятки»)
- Interdepartmental scientific collection "Archives. Archaeography. Sources" (original name – «Архівознавство. Археографія. Джерелознавство»)
- Serial edition "Archived and bibliographic sources of the Ukrainian historical idea" (original name – "Архівні та бібліографічні джерела української історичної думки")
- Serial edition "History of the archived business : remembrances, researches, sources" (original name – "Історія архівної справи: спогади, дослідження, джерела")
- Bulletin of Branch service of scientific and technical information from the archived business and documents (original name – Бюлетень Галузевої служби науково-технічної інформації з архівної справи та документознавства)

== URIAARK communications with mass media ==
- The announcement of admission to URIAARK graduate school was published in the newspaper "Osvita Ukrainy" No. 45-46 of 20.06.2011.
- During the V International conference of young scientists "History science at the beginning of 21st century: problems, past, present and perspectives" (Kherson, June 2–3, 2011) director of the Institute O. Garanin, taking part in the conference, gave an interview with local television station "Skifia", which was issued on "Tavria news," June 9, 2011.
- Up to the Day of Science, May 21, 2011, the interview of O. Haranin, URIAARK director, entitled "Reflection of the State" was published in the newspaper "Osvita Ukrainy" No. 37-38 of 23.05.2011.
- The notice about the signing of trilateral agreement on cooperation between the Belarusian Research Institute of Records Keeping and Archival Affairs, the All-Russian Research Institute of Records Keeping and Archival Affairs and the Ukrainian Research Institute of Archival Affairs and Record Keeping within the framework of the XVII International Scientific Conference "Documentation in an Information Society : International Experience in Documents Managing". Posted on the site "Archivist Bulletin" 5.5.2011.
- The announcement of the presentation of methodical manual "Examination of the value of administrative documents: history, theory, methodology" was issued on the pages of "Іstorychna Pravda", 04.27.2011.
- April 21, 2011 O. Haranin, URIAARM director, took part in a program "The Evening Meetings" on "Culture" radio channel.

== List of directors ==
- 1994–2001: Volodymyr Lyakhotskyy (PhD candidate of historical sciences)
- 2001–2009: Iryna Matyash (professor, doctor of historical sciences)
- 2009–2010: Iryna Maha
- 2010–2023: Oleksandr Haranin (PhD candidate of historical sciences)
- 2023–2024: Vitaliy Skalsky
- 2025: Hrihoriy Kovalsky
- 2025– : Hennadiy Vasylchuk

== Sources ==
- Boryak, Hennadiy Volodymyrovych; Matyash, Iryna Borysivna; Papakin, Heorhiy Volodymyrovych, eds. (2005). Архівні установи України: Довідник. Т.1. Державні архіви. Arkhivni ustanovy Ukraïny. Tom 1: Derz︠h︡avni arkhivy [Archival institutions in Ukraine: A Handbook. Volume 1: State Archives] (PDF) (in Ukrainian). Kyiv: State Archive Committee of Ukraine. p. 673. ISBN 978-966-625-029-5.
