= Bhat =

Bhat (also spelled Bhatt or Butt, IAST: Bhāṭ) is a Brahmin title and a surname used in the Indian subcontinent. Bhat and Bhatt are shortened renditions of the Sanskrit word Bhatta.

== Etymology ==
The word "Bhat" (Sanskrit: भट्ट, IAST: Bhaṭṭa) means "scholar" in Sanskrit. While the original shortened rendition of "Bhatta" was "Bhat" or "Bhatt," many of the Kashmiri Brahmin migrants to the Punjab region started spelling their surname as "Butt", which is the transliteration of the name when written using the Urdu/Persian alphabet (as opposed to Bhat when using the Devanagari alphabet).

== Geographic distribution ==
=== Goa ===
The surname is in use among some Konkani Goud Saraswat Brahmins as well as Konkani Christians (who trace their ancestry to the Gaud Saraswat Brahmins of Goa).

=== Kashmir ===
Batt or Butt (a local Kashmiri language form of Sanskrit language Brahmin title Bhatt) is a generic term used for all Brahmins or Kashmiri Pandit of Kashmir valley irrespective of their individual surnames, as well as the Kashmiri Brahmins who migrated to Punjab, a region now divided between India and the neighbouring Pakistan.

The Bhats who migrated to Punjab in the late 19th century and the early 20th century due to the 1878 drought, were Brahmin migrants from Kashmir, escaping discrimination by local rulers and seeking trade opportunities.

The surname is now shared by both Kashmiri Hindus and Kashmiri Muslims who mostly retained their Hindu last names.

=== Punjab ===
Some Bhats/Butts found in the Punjab region are descendants of those Kashmiri Brahmins who migrated to different cities of (undivided) Punjab from the princely state of Jammu and Kashmir during the 1878 famine in British India.

In Ludhiana, Kashmiris became known for their contribution to the handicraft arena.

=== Karnataka, Tamil Nadu, Telangana and Andhra Pradesh ===
The word Bhaṭṭa (Kannada: ಭಟ್ಟ) or Bhaṭṭar (Tamil: பட்டர்) or Bhaṭṭu (Telugu: భట్టు) is traditionally used, especially in the states of Tamil Nadu, Karnataka, Telangana, and Andhra Pradesh usually to denote a "learned man" or a "scholar" (Brahmins), but also in other southern states.

It was originally used as an honorific like śāstri or paṇḍita, but has become a surname in parts of the country in modern times used as a family name rather than an honorific. In Southern Karnataka naming convention followed is such that, generally, one's father's name is kept as the surname irrespective of caste and many of these honorifics continue to be used as honorifics.

In earlier times a caste name or village name was used by the Tamils as their last name, but due to the influence of the Dravidian movement, Tamils of all castes have mostly given up caste surnames. However, women frequently adopt their father's or husband's name and take it for successive generations. But, honorific like Bhaṭṭar are still in use in spoken language rather than as a surname.

== Notable individuals ==
=== Academics ===
- Aryabhata (476–550 CE), first of the major mathematician-astronomers from the classical age of Indian mathematics and astronomy
- B. V. Rajarama Bhat (born 1966), Indian mathematician
- Bāṇabhaṭṭa, Sanskrit, prose writer and poet
- Bhargav Bhatt (mathematician) (born 1983), Indian-American mathematician
- Eric Bhat (1956–2025), French journalist
- Kiran Bhat (born 1990), Indian-American novelist
- Mayurbhatta, poet of Harsha's court
- Miriam Butt, Professor of Linguistics and Chair of the Department of Linguistics (Facereich Sprachwissenschaft) at the University of Konstanz
- Motiram Bhatta (1866–1896), Nepali Sanskrit and Khas language poet
- Muhammad Asim Butt, Pakistani Urdu novelist and short story writer
- P. Gururaja Bhat (1924–1978), Indian archaeologist
- Pamposh Bhat (born 1958), Kashmiri Indian environmentalist
- Rasheed Butt (born 1944), renowned Pakistani artist and recipient of "The Pride of Performance" 1989
- Suresh Bhat (1932–2003), Marathi Indian ghazal writer
- U. Narayan Bhat (1934–2021), Indian mathematician
- U. R. Bhat, economist
- Vasanti N. Bhat-Nayak, Indian mathematician
- Vinay Bhat (born 1984), American chess player

=== Actors, models, technicians and musicians ===
- Ahmed Butt (born 1975), male Pakistani model and actor
- Ali Azmat Butt (born 20 April 1970), Pakistani rock artist and former lead singer of rock band Junoon
- Alia Bhatt (born 1993), Bollywood actress
- Ambreen Butt, Pakistani model
- Anuradha Bhat (born 1969), Indian playback singer
- Asha Bhat (born 1992), Indian model
- Asim Butt (born 1978), Pakistani painter and sculptor and a member of the Stuckist Art Movement
- Biraj Bhatta, Nepalese actor
- DJ Butt (born 1987), Pakistani disc jockey for PTI
- Farhan Saeed Butt (born 1984), Pakistani singer and member of rock band Jal
- Imran Imtiaz Butt, Pakistani singer
- Ganapati Bhat, Hindustani classical vocalist
- Hrishitaa Bhatt, Indian model
- Keerthi Bhat (born 1999), Indian actress
- Mahesh Bhatt (born 1948), Indian film producer and director
- Muhammad Younis Butt (born 1962), Pakistani screenwriter
- Neil Bhatt, Indian television actor, dancer and choreographer
- Osman Khalid Butt (born 1986), Pakistani actor
- Pooja Bhatt (born 1972), Indian actress
- Praneet Bhat, Kashmiri Indian actor
- Rabia Butt, Pakistani model
- Rahul Bhat, Kashmiri Indian actor
- Ramesh Bhat, Indian actor
- Samina Peerzada Butt, Pakistani actress
- Tanmay Bhat, Indian actor and comedian
- Yogaraj Bhat (born 1972), Indian film writer and director

=== Businesspeople ===
- Baiju Bhatt (born 1984/1985), American billionaire, co-founder of Robinhood

=== Military ===
- Malik Tazi Bhat, 15th-century warlord, from Jammu, who fought the Lodhi Dynasty
- Muhammad Zaki Butt (1929–1993), former Air Commodore in the Pakistan Air Force and bodyguard of Quaid-e-Azam, Muhammad Ali Jinnah
- Tahir Rafique Butt (born 1955), 20th Chief of Air Staff of the Pakistan Air Force
- Ziauddin Butt, former Chief of the Inter-Services Intelligence

=== Politics ===
- Balaji Vishwanath Bhat (1662–1720), Peshwa of the Maratha Empire
- Ghulam Mustafa Bhat, former mayor of Srinagar
- Hassan Butt (born 1980), the former spokesman for the disbanded British Islamist group Al-Muhajiroun
- Hina Pervaiz Butt (born 1982), Pakistani politician
- Kalsoom Nawaz Sharif, First Lady of Pakistan, wife of Prime Minister Nawaz Sharif, of Kashmiri origin
- Khemraj Bhatta "Mayalu", Nepali Congress politician
- Lekh Raj Bhatta, Nepali CPN Maoist politician
- Masarat Alam Bhat (born 1971), Kashmiri separatist
- Maqbool Bhat (1938–1984), executed Kashmiri separatist
- Sanjiv Bhatt former Indian Police Service officer
- Shakeel Bhat (born c. 1978), outspoken Kashmiri separatist activist, labelled as an "Islamic Rage Boy" by Western media
- S. L. Bhat, Kashmiri Indian serving as chairman of the Jammu & Kashmir Public Service Commission
- Shailen Bhatt administrator of the Federal Highway Administration
- Sohail Shaukat Butt (born 1983), Pakistani politician
- Trilochan Bhatta (born 1969), Nepalese politician and current Chief Minister of Sudurpashchim Province, Nepal
- Umer Tanveer Butt (born 1982), politician and Member of the Punjab Provincial Assembly, businessman, and philanthropist

=== Scientists ===
- Atul Butte, researcher in biomedical informatics and biotechnology entrepreneur in Silicon Valley
- Noor Muhammad Butt (born 1936), Pakistani nuclear physicist, research scientist, and chairman of the Pakistan Science Foundation
- Parvez Butt (born 1942), Pakistani nuclear engineer and former chairman of the Pakistan Atomic Energy Commission

=== Sports ===
- Abhishek Bhat (born 1989), Indian cricket player
- Amad Butt (born 1995), Pakistani cricket player for Islamabad United, of Kashmiri origin
- Arif Butt (1944–2007), Pakistani cricket player
- Arvind Bhat (born 1979), Indian badminton player
- Bhargav Bhatt (cricketer) (born 1990), Indian cricketer
- Danish Farooq Bhat (born 1996), Indian professional footballer
- Ghulam Mohammad Baksh Butt (1878–1960), popularly known by his ring name the Great Gama, pehlwani wrestler of Kashmiri Muslim origin
- Hussain Butt (born 1976), Pakistani cricketer
- Ijaz Butt (1938–2023), former chairman of Pakistan Cricket Board and cricket player, of Kashmiri origin
- Ikram Butt (born 1968), rugby player for England, of Pakistani/Kashmiri origin
- Muhammad Sharif Butt (1926–2015), Pakistani sprinter
- Pramila Bhatt (born 1969), Indian cricketer
- Raghuram Bhat (born 1958), Indian cricketer
- Rehan Butt (born 1980), Pakistani field hockey player
- Sadia Butt (born 1975), Pakistani cricketer
- Salman Butt (born 1984), Pakistani cricketer
- Samad Bhat (born 1995), Indian cricket player
- Shujauddin Butt (1930–2006), Pakistani cricketer
- Yasir Butt (born 1986), Pakistani squash player
- Yousuf Butt (born 1989), Pakistani footballer

== Fictional ==
- Babu Bhatt, Pakistani restaurateur in the US sitcom Seinfeld

== See also ==
- Barot (caste)
- Bhati
- Bhattacharyya
- Bhatra Sikhs
