= Ghulam Mustafa =

Ghulam Mustafa (Persian: غلام مصطفى) is a male Muslim given name. It may refer to:

== People ==
- Qazi Ghulam Mustafa (died c. 1711), nobleman during the Mughal empire
- Golam Mostofa (poet) (1897–1964), Bengali writer and poet
- Ghulam Mustafa Tabassum (1899–1978), Indian/Pakistani poet who wrote in Urdu, Punjabi, and Persian
- Ghulam Mustafa Guard (also Ghulam Guard; 1925–1978), Indian cricketer
- Khondakar Ghulam Mustafa (1928–2010), Bangladeshi journalist and diplomat
- Ghulam Mustafa Jatoi (1931–2009), Pakistani politician
- Ghulam Mustafa Khan (disambiguation)
  - Ghulam Mustafa Khan (literature scholar) (1912–2005), Pakistani linguist, writer, educationist and Sufi religious leader
  - Ghulam Mustafa Khan (singer) (1931–2021), Indian classical musician in the Hindustani tradition
  - Ghulam Mustafa Khan (statistician) (1932–2016), Pakistani cricket administrator
- A. B. Mohammad Ghulam Mostafa Barashalghari, Bangladeshi businessman and politician
- Golam Mustafa (1935–2003), Bangladeshi film actor
- Ghulam Mustafa Khar (born 1937), Pakistani politician from Punjab Province
- Golam Mostafa Khan (1940–2022), Bangladeshi dance artist
- Golam Mustafa (photographer) (1941–2021), Bangladeshi photographer
- ANM Golam Mostafa (1942–1971), Bengali martyred intellectual and journalist
- Khandaker Golam Mostafa (1943–2020), Bangladeshi politician
- Sheikh Md. Golam Mostofa Dohari (1949–2019), Bangladeshi freedom fighter
- Golam Mostafa Ahmed (1951–2017), Bangladeshi politician
- Golam Mostofa Nilphamari (born 1955), Bangladeshi politician
- Ghulam Mustafa Bhat (1961–2011), Indian mayor of Srinagar
- Gazi Golam Mostafa (died 1981), Bangladeshi politician
- Md. Golam Mostofa Biswas (born 1967), Bangladeshi politician
- A B Mohammad Golam Mustafa Faridpuri, Bangladeshi politician
- Golam Mostafa Aqqelpuri, Bangladeshi politician
- Md. Golam Mustafa Ratidangi (died 2014), Bangladeshi politician
- Ghulam Mustafa (Pakistan Army officer), General of the Pakistan Army

== Entertainment ==
- Ghulam-E-Mustafa, a 1997 Indian film by Partho Ghosh

== See also ==
- Ghulam (disambiguation)
  - Ghulam, Arabic male given name
- Mustafa (disambiguation)
  - Mustafa, Arabic male given name
