= Mustafa =

- Pronunciation: Arabic: [ˈmusˤtˤafaː, musˤˈtˤafaː] Egyptian Arabic: [mosˈtˤɑfɑ] English: /mʊˈstɑːfə/ Turkish: [mustaˈfa]
- Gender: Male

Origin
- Origin: Arabic
- Meaning: "The Chosen One" "المختار"
- Region of origin: Arabia

Other names
- Alternative spelling: Mostafa, Mostapha, Moustafa, Moustapha, Mustapha, Mustafi

Mustafa (Arabic: مصطفى, romanized: Muṣṭafā) is one of the names of the Islamic prophet Muhammad. It is Arabic for "chosen, selected, appointed, preferred". It is a common male given name and derived surname in Muslim-majority countries.

== Given name ==
=== Moustafa ===
- Moustafa Ali (1965–2025), Egyptian–Canadian Canadian football player
- Moustafa Amar (born 1966), Egyptian musician and actor
- Moustafa Bayoumi (born 1966), American writer, journalist, and professor
- Moustafa Farroukh (1901–1957), Lebanese painter
- Moustafa Al-Qazwini (born 1961), Iraqi-American imam, religious leader, and scholar
- Moustafa Reyadh (1941–2026), Egyptian footballer
- Moustafa Shakosh (born 1986), Syrian footballer
- Moustafa Ahmed Shebto (born 1986), Qatari long-distance runner

=== Moustapha ===
- Moustapha Agnidé (born 1981), Beninese footballer
- Moustapha Akkad (1930–2005), Syrian-American film producer and director
- Moustapha Alassane (1942–2015), Nigerien filmmaker
- Moustapha Bokoum (born 1999), Belgian footballer
- Moustapha Lamrabat (born 1983), Moroccan-Belgian photographer
- Moustapha Niasse (born 1939), Senegalese politician and diplomat
- Abdul Moustapha Ouédraogo (born 1988), Ivorian footballer
- Moustapha Salifou (born 1983), Togolese footballer
- Moustapha Sall (1967–2025), Mauritanian football manager and player
- Moustapha Bayal Sall (born 1985), Senegalese footballer

=== Mostafa ===
- Mostafa Kamal (Bir Sreshtho) (1947–1971), Bangladeshi freedom fighter and recipient of the Bir Sreshtho
- Mostafa Madbouly (born 1966), 54th and current Prime Minister of Egypt
- Mostafa Matar (born 1995), Lebanese footballer
- Mostafa Mohsin Montu (1945–2025), Bangladeshi politician

=== Mustafa ===
- Mustafa I, Mustafa II, Mustafa III, and Mustafa IV, sultans of the Ottoman Empire
- Mustafa Abdul-Hamid (born 1988), American basketball player
- Mustafa Abdul Jalil (born 1952), Libyan politician
- Mustafa Abubakar (born 1949), Indonesian politician
- Mustafa Abi (born 1979), Turkish basketball player
- Mustafa Ahmed (born 1996), Sudanese-Canadian spoken-word poet, singer, songwriter, and filmmaker
- Mustafa Akaydın (born 1952), Turkish politician
- Mustafa Ali (born 1986), American wrestler
- Mustafa al-Mousa (born 1977), Syrian politician and pharmacist, and First Deputy Speaker of the People's Assembly of Syria
- Mustafa Al-Kadhimi (born 1967), 79th Prime Minister of Iraq
- Mustafa Amini (born 1993), Australian association footballer of Afghan and Nicaraguan descent
- Mustafa Armağan (born 1961), Turkish Islamist journalist and conspiracy theorist
- Mustafa Arruf (1948–2025), Spanish sculptor
- Mustafa Arslanović (born 1960), Bosnian footballer
- Mustafa Altıoklar (born 1958), Turkish film director, producer, and screenwriter
- Mustafa Aydın (born 1967), Turkish academic, writer, columnist, TV commentator, and public intellectual
- Mustafa Badreddine (1961–2016), Lebanese freedom fighter and member of Hezbollah
- Mustafa Barzani (1903–1979), Iraqi Kurdish nationalist leader
- Mustafa Bey Alibeyov (1872–1945), Azerbaijani publicist, writer, playwright, and lawyer
- Mustafa bey Vakilov (1896–1965), Azerbaijani public figure, politician, and diplomat
- Mustafa Bülent Ecevit (1925–2006), 16th Prime Minister of Turkey
- Mustafa Cengiz (1949–2021), Turkish businessman and former president of Galatasaray S.K.
- Mustafa Cevahir (born 1986), Turkish footballer
- Mustafa Çağrıcı (born 1950), Turkish civil servant
- Mustafa Çakır (born 1986), Turkish yacht racer
- Mustafa Demir (1961–2025), Turkish politician
- Mustafa Denizli (born 1949), Turkish football coach and player
- Mustafa Erdik (born 1948), Turkish earthquake engineer
- Mustafa Fahmi Pasha (1840–1914), seventh Prime Minister of Egypt
- Mustafa Fevzi Çakmak (1876–1950), Turkish field marshal
- Mustafa Groener (born 1999), German politician
- Mustafa Güzelgöz (1921–2005), Turkish librarian
- Mustafa Hadid (born 1988), Afghan footballer
- Mustafa Hamid (1945–2025), also known by his nom de guerre Abu Walid al-Masri, Egyptian journalist and jihadist
- Mustafa Hassan (born 1990), Iraqi footballer
- Mustafa al-Hawsawi (born 1968), Saudi alleged financier of the New York Raid
- Mustafa Hukić (1951–1999), Bosnian footballer
- Mustafa İsmet İnönü (1884–1973), Turkish Army general, first Prime Minister, and second President of Turkey
- Mustafa Kamal (judge) (1933–2015), Chief Justice of Bangladesh
- Mustafa Kamal (mayor) (born 1971), Pakistani politician
- Mustafa Kamal (politician) (born 1947), Bangladeshi politician, businessman, and cricket official
- Mustafa Kemal Atatürk (1881–1938), Turkish field marshal and the founder of the Republic of Turkey
- Mustafa Khalil Abdi (born 1967), also known as Mazloum Abdi, Syrian politician and former rebel commander who was commander-in-chief of the Syrian Democratic Forces (SDF) until its dissolution in 2026
- Mustafa Karim (born 1987), Iraqi footballer
- Mustafa Kocabey (born 1974), Turkish footballer
- Mustafa Korkmaz (born 1988), Dutch wheelchair basketball player of Turkish descent
- Mustafa Kučuković (born 1986), German footballer
- Ghulam Mustafa Khan (literature scholar) (1912–2005), Pakistani scholar, researcher, literary critic, linguist, author, educationist, and religious leader
- Ghulam Mustafa Jatoi (1931–2009), Pakistani statesman
- Mustafa Mahmoud (1921–2009), Egyptian scientist, doctor, philosopher, journalist, and author
- Mustafa Malayekah (born 1986), Saudi Arabian footballer
- Mustafa Pasha (1557–1614), Georgian noble
- Mustafa Merlika-Kruja (1887–1958), 16th Prime Minister of Albania
- Mustafa Nadarević (1943–2020), Bosnian actor
- Mustafa Nayyem (born 1981), Afghan-Ukrainian journalist
- Mustafa Özkan (born 1975), Turkish footballer
- Mustafa Pektemek (born 1988), Turkish footballer
- Mustafa Qureshi (born 1938), Pakistani actor
- Mustafa Sandal (born 1970), Turkish singer, composer, and actor
- Mustafa Sarp (born 1980), Turkish footballer
- Mustafa Shahabi (1893–1968), Syrian agronomist, politician, and writer
- Mustafa Shaikh (born 1979/80), Indian cricketer
- Mustafa Shokay (1890–1941), Kazakh political activist and Turkestan nationalist
- Mustafa Şentop (born 1968), Turkish politician and 29th Speaker of the Grand National Assembly of Turkey (2019–2023)
- Mustafa Subhi (1883–1921), Turkish communist leader
- Mustafa Topchubashov (1895–1981), Azerbaijani surgeon
- Mustafa Tuna (born 1957), Turkish environmental engineer, politician, and Mayor of Ankara
- Mustafa Wahba, Saudi politician
- Mustafa Yılmaz (born 1992), Turkish chess grandmaster
- Mustafa Yumlu (born 1987), Turkish footballer
- Mustafa Zahid (born 1984), Pakistani music composer and singer
- Mustafa Zaidi (1930–1970), Pakistani poet and civil servant
- Mustafa Pasha (disambiguation), various people
- Nur Mustafa Gülen (born 1960), Turkish footballer and coach

=== Mustafah ===
- Mustafah Muhammad (born 1973), American gridiron footballer

=== Mustapa ===
- Mustapa Mohamed (born 1950), Malaysian politician

=== Mustapha ===
- Mustapha Aga, Ottoman Empire ambassador to the Swedish Court
- Mustapha Cassiem (born 2002), South African field hockey player
- Mustapha Chadili (born 1973), Moroccan football goalkeeper
- Mustapha Dahleb (born 1952), Algerian footballer
- Mustapha Djazaïri (1814–1863), Algerian resistant
- Mustapha Hadji (born 1971), Moroccan footballer
- Mustapha Harun (1918–1995), Sabahan 1st governor and 3rd chief minister
- Mustapha Ishak Boushaki (born 1967), Algerian cosmologist
- Mustapha Karkouti (1943–2020), Syrian journalist
- Mustapha Kartali (born 1946), Islamist guerrilla leader
- Mustapha Khalfi (born 1980), Moroccan basketball player
- Mustapha Labsi, Algerian arrested on terrorism charges
- Mustapha Larfaoui (born 1932), Algerian athlete
- Mustapha Matura (1939–2019), Trinidadian playwright
- Mustapha Sama (born 1979), Sierra Leonean soccer player
- Mustapha Zaari (1945–2024), Moroccan actor
- Jimmy Durham (1883–1910), originally named Mustapha, first African soldier in the British Army

== Surname ==
=== Mostafa ===
- Ahmed Mostafa (footballer, born 1940) (1940–2022), Egyptian footballer
- Ahmed Mostafa (footballer, born 1987) (born 1987), Egyptian footballer
- Amr Mostafa (born 1979), Egyptian singer and composer
- Hassan Mostafa (born 1979), Egyptian footballer
- Tarek Mostafa (born 1971), Egyptian footballer
- Walid Mostafa (1972–2025), Egyptian media executive

=== Moustafa ===
- Hisham Talaat Moustafa (born 1959), Egyptian businessman
- Ibrahim Moustafa (1904–1968), Egyptian wrestler
- Mouaz Moustafa (born 1986), Syrian-American activist
- Tamer Moustafa (born 1982), Egyptian basketball player

=== Moustapha ===
- Baba Moustapha (1952–1982), Chadian playwright
- Hamadou Moustapha (born 1945), Cameroonian politician

=== Mustafa ===
- Nawshirwan Mustafa (1944–2017), Kurdish politician
- Abu Mustafa (1925–1966), Pakistani cricketer
- Abu Ali Mustafa (1938–2001), Palestinian politician
- Allan Mustafa (born 1985), British actor and comedian
- Domenico Mustafà (1829–1912), Italian singer and composer
- Erkan Mustafa (born 1970), British actor
- Fazil Mustafa (born 1965), Azerbaijani politician
- Herro Mustafa (born 1973), American diplomat
- Isaiah Mustafa (born 1974), American actor
- Ismail Isa Mustafa (born 1989), Bulgarian footballer
- Kara Mustafa (1634/35–1683), Ottoman Albanian military leader and Vizier in the 17th century, led the 1683 siege of Vienna
- Melton Mustafa (1947–2017), American jazz musician and educator
- Mohamed Mustafa (born 1996), Sudanese footballer
- Mustafa Mustafa (born 1955), Greek politician
- Rahma El Siddig Mustafa, Sudanese disability rights activist
- Şehzade Mustafa (1515–1553), Turkish şehzade (prince)
- Shukri Mustafa (1942–1978), Egyptian Islamist
- Shkodran Mustafi (born 1992), German footballer
- Zubeida Mustafa (1941–2025), Pakistani journalist

=== Mustapha ===
- Boss Mustapha (born 1956), Nigerian lawyer and politician
- J. F. O. Mustapha (died 1997), Ghanaian physician and academic
- Joseph Mustapha, Sierra Leonean politician and lawyer
- Malik Mustapha (born 2002), American football player
- Riga Mustapha (born 1981), Ghanaian-born Dutch footballer
- Shettima Mustapha (1939–2022), Nigerian academic and politician

== See also ==
- Mustapha (song)
- Mustafayev
- Mustafa (disambiguation)
- Mustafa Prize
- Arabic name
- Azerbaijani name
- Turkish name
- Pakistani name
