= Ilgar =

Ilgar or ILGAR may refer to:

== People ==
- Ilgar Gurbanov (born 1986), Azerbaijani footballer
- Ilgar Mamedov (born 1965), Russian fencer
- Ilgar Mammadov (born 1970), Azerbaijani politician

== Other uses ==
- Ion Layer Gas Reaction, a non-vacuum technique for thin film deposition
- The Ilgar language
