= Erdik =

Erdik may refer to:

- Erdik medal, state decoration of Kyrgyzstan
- Mustafa Erdik (born 1948), Turkish professor emeritus, expert in earthquake engineering
- Erdik (village), village in Kyrgyzstan

== See also ==
- Erdek (disambiguation)
