= Erkin Gadirli =

Azerbaijani lawyer and politician

- Erkin Toğrul oğlu Qədirli
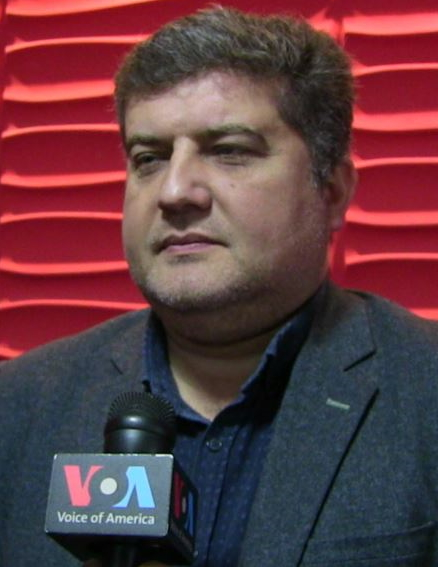
- Gadirli in 2020

Member of the Azerbaijani National Assembly's VI convocation
- Incumbent
- Assumed office 10 March 2020
- President: Ilham Aliyev
- Preceded by: Aytan Mustafayeva
- Constituency: Second Yasamal

Co-chair of REAL Movement
- In office 2008 – May 2014 Serving with Ilgar Mammadov

Member of the Political Committee of the REAL Party
- Incumbent
- Assumed office 2020
- President: Ilgar Mammadov

Personal details
- Born: Erkin Toğrul oğlu Qədirli; May 13, 1972 (age 54) Baku, Azerbaijani SSR, Soviet Union
- Party: Republican Alternative Party
- Parent: Toghrul Gadirli (father)
- Education: Baku State University
- Occupation: lawyer, politician

Erkin Toghrul oglu Gadirli (Azerbaijani: Erkin Toğrul oğlu Qədirli; born 13 May 1972), is an Azerbaijani lawyer, politician, deputy of the Azerbaijani National Assembly. He's one of the leading figures of the opposition Republican Alternative Party.

== Early life ==
Erkin Gadirli was born on 13 May 1972, in Baku, the capital of the Azerbaijani SSR, which was then part of the Soviet Union. His name, which was very rare in the Soviet era, was given by his grandfather. His parents divorced in 1976, and Gadirli had not contacted his father again. He received his education in Russian. In 1990, he graduated from the law faculty of Baku State University.

== Career ==
=== Law ===
Gadirli worked as a lecturer at the Faculty of Law and International Relations of Baku State University from 1994 to 2006. At various times, he was as an expert for the International Committee of the Red Cross, the United Nations, the OSCE, the Council of Europe, as well as in different national and international projects and working groups. In 1998, he was a member of the Azerbaijani delegation to the UN Diplomatic Conference on the Establishment of the International Criminal Court in Rome, Italy. Gadirli was nominated to the Board of the Azerbaijan Lawyers Forum in 2011.

=== Political ===
Gadirli co-founded the Republican Alternative (REAL) on 25 December 2008, as a social movement, and later as a political party. He served as the chairman of the Republican Alternative Movement until May 2014. He was relieved from his post for "contradicting the movement's basic principles and program documents." According to another board member, Natig Jafarli, he was fired for voicing several views on harsh authoritarianism. Gadirli's right to vote on the board and give interviews to the media about the party's activities was also restricted for three months. Gadirli himself stated that the decision was not "unexpected" for him, but expressed "deep concerns" over the decision.

İn October 2017, Erkin Gadirli stated that he would leave politics and return to law. Despite this, he participated in the snap Azerbaijani parliamentary elections in 2020 as an independent candidate, as the REAL Party was not registered with the Ministry of Justice. He also submitted the information on his unemployment to the Central Election Committee before the elections. He was elected a deputy from Yasamal second constituency No. 16 with a majority of 34.4% of the votes. Gadirli was criticised by the Azerbaijani opposition for accepting the mandate and getting in the parliament. He was elected as a member of the Parliamentary Committee on Legal Policy and State Building and the Parliamentary Committee on Defense, Security and Combating Corruption. He was also elected as head of the Azerbaijan–Ireland inter-parliamentary working group, and as member of the Azerbaijani delegation to PACE. Since 4 August 2020, he is a member of the political committee of the Republican Alternative Party.

== Political positions ==
Erkin Gadirli is in opposition to the government of the New Azerbaijan Party, which is ruling in Azerbaijan since 1993. Gadirli stated that he was not a democrat, but a supporter of right-wing authoritarianism. According to him, when the government changes in Azerbaijan, democracy will not be possible in the early years, and the reforms will need to be carried out in a right-wing authoritarian method, implementing "strict measures to regulate the political arena", and support "tough economic reforms in the market relations." He was therefore widely criticised within the party. Erkin Gadirli also spoke of the assassination of the Armenian political figures who committed the Khojaly massacre in 1992, where at least 200 and possibly as high as 613 ethnic Azerbaijani civilians were massacred by Armenian Armed Forces and the 366th CIS regiment, as an act of revenge, for which he was verbally warned by the leadership of the REAL Party. He also called Armenia an "organisation created by Russia," noting that Russia had "expelled the Azerbaijanis from their historical lands, and forcibly changed their names and language."

Gadirli identifies himself as a civic nationalist. He himself stated that he was not one of those people who "carried ethnic concepts into politics." According to him, the ethnic nationalism is "very dangerous in a multi-rooted society," calling it chauvinism and backwardness. Gadirli stated that the Russian nationalism had the detrimental effects on Azerbaijan. According to Gadirli, the potential rise of chauvinism in Azerbaijan in a reaction to the Russian, Armenian, Iranian and potentially Georgian ones, was not surprising, but unacceptable, saying that Azerbaijan should not be chauvinistic like its neighbours.

Gadirli supports the naming of the Azerbaijani language as Turkic and ethnic Azerbaijanis as Turks. Erkin Gadirli opposes the Turkification of the historical states that existed on the territory of modern-day Azerbaijan. He stated that "some people are afraid that we have emphasized that we came here later by calling ourselves Turks, thus giving the Armenians an argumentative advantage." Erkin Gadirli said that the Azerbaijanis were always Turks, but they had not always been here, and for him, the Turkic migration to the region was not a problem at all, it had neither weaknesses, shortcomings or other unpleasant aspects. According to him, the Russian sector in Azerbaijan had very serious problems with the formation of a national prejudice in the education system.

== Works ==
- Commentary on the Rome Statute of the International Criminal Court (1999; co-author).
