= Mustafayev =

Mustafayev (Russian: Мустафаев, Ukrainian: Мустафаєв) is an Azerbaijani masculine surname slavicized from the Arabic masculine given name Mustafa and the Russian ending "-(y)ev"; its feminine counterpart is Mustafayeva. Notable people with this surname include:

- Aghahuseyn Mustafayev (born 1989), Azerbaijani wrestler
- Ali Mustafayev (1952–1991), Azerbaijani journalist
- Asan Mustafayev (born 1965), Ukrainian football coach and former player
- Aynur Mustafayeva (born 1998), Azerbaijani gymnast
- Aytən Mustafayeva (born 1968), Azerbaijani politician
- Bakir Mustafayev (1898–1978), Azerbaijani soldier
- Bayram Mustafayev (born 1987), Azerbaijani Paralympic judoka
- Behbud Mustafayev (born 1982), Azerbaijani Catholic priest
- Bunyamudin Mustafayev (born 1992), Russian footballer
- Chingiz Mustafayev (singer) (born 1991), Azerbaijani singer
- Chingiz Mustafayev (journalist) (1960–1992), Azerbaijani journalist
- Elchin Mustafayev (born 2000), Azerbaijani footballer
- Emil Mustafayev (born 2001), Ukrainian football player
- Eskender Mustafaiev (born 1981), Ukrainian swimmer
- Firuz Mustafayev (1933–2018), Azerbaijani politician
- Gullu Mustafayeva (1919–1994), Azerbaijani Soviet painter
- Imam Mustafayev (1910–1997), Azerbaijani politician
- Karam Mustafayev (born 1962), Azerbaijani general
- Khydyr Mustafayev (1905–1975), Azerbaijani military officer
- Kseniya Moustafaeva (born 1995), French rhythmic gymnast
- Magomed Mustafaev (born 1988), Russian mixed martial artist
- Nataliya Mustafayeva (born 1985), Azerbaijani rower
- Ramil Mustafaev (born 2003), Russian footballer
- Ramiz Mustafayev (1926–2008), Azerbaijani musician
- Refat Mustafaev (1911–1984), Crimean Tatar communist politician
- Roshen Mustafayev (1960–2009), Azerbaijani political scientist
- Rustam Mustafayev (1910–1940), Azerbaijani scenic designer
- Samira Mustafaeva (born 1993), Russian gymnast
- Server Mustafayev (born 1986), Crimean Tatar human rights activist
- Shahin Mustafayev (born 1965), Azerbaijani politician
- Sona Mustafayeva (1916–1999), Azerbaijani vocalist and actress
- Vagif Mustafayev (born 1953), Azerbaijani film director, producer and screenwriter
- Vahid Mustafayev (born 1968), Azerbaijani journalist, businessman and filmmaker
- Vugar Mustafayev (born 1986), Azerbaijani politician
- Vugar Mustafayev (born 1994), Azerbaijani football midfielder
