= Maria Rentetzi =

Greek historian of science

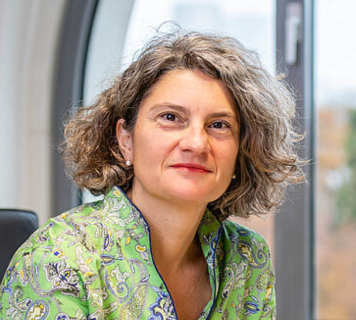
Prof. Dr. Maria Rentetzi

Maria Rentetzi is a Professor of History of Science and Technology and holds the Chair for Science, Technology and Gender Studies at Friedrich-Alexander-Universität Erlangen-Nürnberg, Germany.

== Early life and education ==
Born in Kavala, Greece, Rentetzi was trained as a physicist at the Aristotle University of Thessaloniki, received her MA in History of Science and Technology from the National Technical University of Athens (NTUA), and a PhD in Science and Technology Studies from Virginia Tech.

== Career ==
Rentetzi was previously a tenured professor at NTUA, a Lise Meitner Fellow of the Austrian Science Fund, a Silverman Professor at Tel Aviv University's Cohn Institute for the History and Philosophy of Science and Ideas, a guest professor at TU Berlin, and is currently a visiting scholar at the Max Planck Institute for the History of Science. She is also a past president of the International Union of the History and Philosophy of Science's Commission of Women and Gender, and a member of the editorial board of the journals History and Technology and Centaurus, among others.

The European Research Council (ERC) awarded Rentetzi one of its prestigious "Consolidator Grants" for her work on nuclear diplomacy - the ERC project is called "Living with Radiation: The Role of the International Atomic Energy Agency in the History of Radiation Protection". She is a work package leader within the Horizon 2020 project "InsSciDE - Inventing a Shared Science Diplomacy for Europe", a member of AcademiaNet for excellent female researchers, and was named the 2021 Gordon Cain Conference Fellow by the Science History Institute.

Rentetzi has published widely on the history of radioactivity and the nuclear sciences and on Greece’s history of tobacco culture and technology.

=== Selected publications ===
- Seduced By Radium: How Industry Commodified Science in the American Marketplace (University of Pittsburgh Press, 2022)
- “Nuclear Diplomacies,” special issue of History and Technology, 37(1) (2021) (ed. with Kenji Ito)
- “The Material Culture and Politics of Artifacts in Nuclear Diplomacy,” special issue of Centaurus, 63 (2) (2021) (ed. with Kenji Ito)
- Boxes: A Field Guide (Mattering Press, 2020) (ed. with Susanne Bauer and Martina Schlünder)
- Tobacco / 101 notes on oriental tobacco (Benaki Museum, 2014) (with Spiros Flevaris)
- “Beyond the Academy: Histories of Knowledge and Gender,” special issue of Centaurus, 55, 2013 (ed. with Christine von Oertzen and Elizabeth S. Watkins)
- Trafficking Materials and Gendered Experimental Practices: Radium Research in Early Twentieth Century Vienna (Columbia University Press, 2007)
- “Gender, Politics, and Radioactivity Research in Interwar Vienna: The Case of the Institute for Radium Research” Isis 95(3) (2004)
