= Nesuh =

Nesuh, meaning "clean" in Turkish, may refer to:

- Nesuh Pasha
- Nesuh Bey (Nesuh-beg)
- Nesuh Voivoda
- Nesuh Aga (Nesuh-aga)
