= Ishak Bey Hranić =

Ottoman governor and soldier

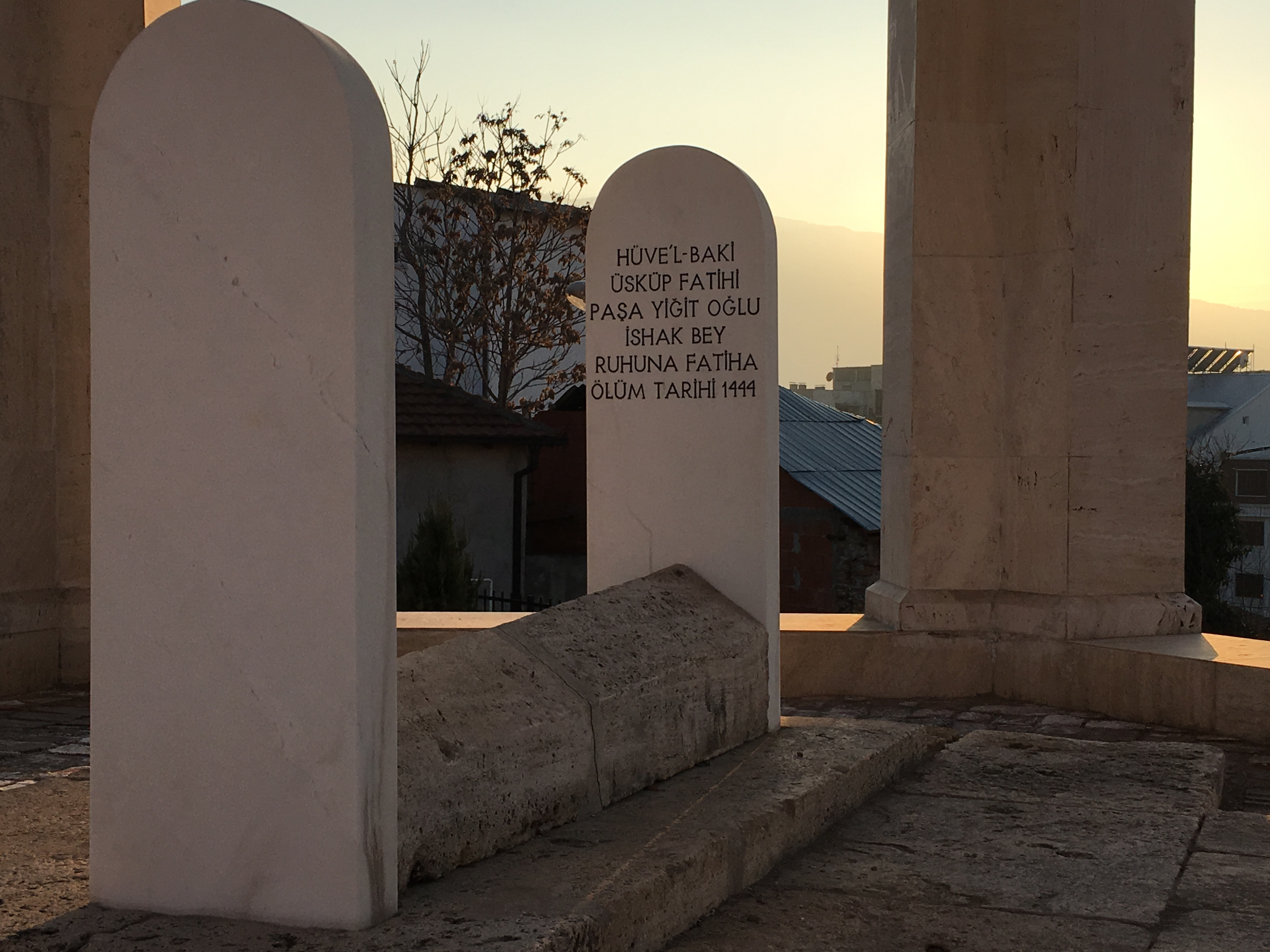
- The grave of Ishak Bey in Skopje
- Died: 1457
- Burial place: Üsküp (today Skopje, modern-day North Macedonia)
- Military career
- Allegiance: Ottoman Empire
- Service years: 15th century
- Rank: Sanjak-bey
- Conflicts: Siege of Thessalonica (1422–30); Albanian Revolt of 1432–1436; Battle of Smederevo (1441); Siege of Novo Brdo (1440-1441); Battle of Niš; Battle of Ostrvica; Siege of Berat (1455); Siege of Novo Brdo (1455); Battle of Albulena

Ishak Bey or Ishak-Beg, also known as Ishak-Beg Hranić, was an Ottoman governor and soldier of Bosnian origin who served as the sanjakbey of Üsküp from 1415 to 1439.

== Biography ==
According to some sources he was a member of the Bosnian Kosača noble family, released slave and adopted son of Pasha Yiğit Bey. It is very possible that in the spirit of the customs of the time, his brother Sandalj Hranić sent him to the sultan's court as a political and diplomatic move as a sign of loyalty to the emperor. His biological father was Hrana Vuković, his full name is Ishak Bey Hranić and according to whom Ishak's most famous son Isa Bey, along with his father's and grandfather's patronymic, will be - Isa Bey Ishaković Hranušić. Ishak Bey is the founder of the Ottoman branch of the aristocratic Bosnian Kosača - Isabegović family.

Ishak was appointed ruler by Porte at the time of the conquest of Foča, Čajniče, Pljevlja and Nevesinje in today's Bosnia and Herzegovina.

In 1420 Ishak Bey organized a successful private campaign in Bosnia to support his brother's struggle against his enemies. He executed Sandalj's opponent Petar Pavlovic and then Ishak Bey divided conquered territory with Sandalj.

In attempt to relieve Ottoman pressure during the Siege of Thessalonica Venice inspired Gjon Kastrioti to rebel against Ottomans in 1428. After Ottomans captured Thessalonica in April 1430 their forces led by Ishak bey captured most of Gjon's land. He positioned Ottoman garrison in two Gjon's castles and destroyed rest of them. In December 1434 during an Albanian revolt he marched in south-central Albania but was defeated by Gjergj Arianiti. Contemporary sources from the senate of Ragusa mention that many Ottoman soldiers were captured, while Ishak Bey escaped with a small group.

In 1439, when he was returning from his trip to Mecca, he was ordered by the sultan to join forces of Şihabeddin Pasha and besiege Novo Brdo, important fortified mining town of Serbian Despotate. On 6 August 1439 the Ottoman forces under Ishak-Beg defeated forces of Serbian Despotate in a battle fought near Novo Brdo. In November 1443 he commanded one of Ottoman armies during the Battle of Niš which ended with Ottoman defeat.

Sultan appointed Himmetizade Nesuh Bey to be the new ruler of Bosansko Krajište in period between 1439 and 1454 when Isa-Beg Ishaković, Ishak Bey's son and ruler of Skopsko Krajište took over control over Bosansko Krajište also for period 1454—1463. His grandson Gazi Mehmed Bey Isabegović aka Čelebi was sanjak-bey of Bosnian Sanjak in period 1484–1485 and sanjak-bey of Sanjak of Herzegovina in period 1507-1510 and 1513-1515.

He built the Ishak Bey Mosque in Skopje, where his tomb is also located.

== Family tree ==
Per Franz Babinger in the Encyclopedia of Islam:

Pasha Yiğit Bey
Ishak Bey	Turahan Bey
Isa Bey Ishaković	Ahmed Bey	Ömer Bey
Hasan Bey	Idris Bey

== Notes ==
1. Adopted by Pasha Jigit Bey, Ishak Beg Hranić was of Bosnian origin and member of Kosača family.

Preceded by Pasha Yiğit Bey	Ottoman governor of the Üsküb frontier 1415–1439	Succeeded by Himmetizade Nesuh Bey
