= Sanjak of Üsküp =

Administrative unit of the Ottoman Empire from 1463 to 1913

Sanjak of Skopje Üsküp Sancağı Скопски Санџак/Skopski Sandžak Sanxhaku i Shkupit Üsküp Sancağı
- Sanjak of the Ottoman Empire
- 1463–1913
- Flag Coat of arms

- Capital: Skopje
- History
  - Established: 1463
  - Treaty of London (1913): 30 May 1913
Preceded by	Succeeded by
District of Branković	Kingdom of Serbia
- Today part of: North Macedonia

The Sanjak of Üsküp was one of the sanjaks in the Ottoman Empire, with Üsküb (modern-day Skopje) as its administrative centre.

== Origins ==
Starting from the end of the 10th century Skopje experienced a period of wars and political troubles. It served as Bulgarian capital from 972 to 992, and Samuel of Bulgaria ruled it from 976 until 1004 when its governor Roman surrendered it to Byzantine Emperor Basil the Bulgar Slayer in 1004 in exchange for the titles of patrician and strategos. It became a centre of a new Byzantine province called Bulgaria. Skopje (Üsküb) had previously been the capital also of the short lived Serbian Empire between 1346 and 1371.

Üsküb became part of Ottoman Empire after it was captured from the District of Branković on January 6, 1392. The first Ottoman governor of Skopje was Pasha Yiğit Bey, who conquered Skopje for the Ottoman Empire. The next one was Isak-Beg who was sent to lead military actions in Serbia in spring of 1439, and was replaced by his son Isa-Beg Isaković in the position of sanjakbeg of the Sanjak of Skopje.

The sanjak was initially formed as the so-called krajište (Skopsko Krajište; lit. borderland of Skopje) that was transformed into a full sanjak in the mid-16th century.

== History ==
The Sanjak of Üsküp had often been given to beylerbeys as arpalik. Up to the 19th century, the sanjak was part of the Eyalet of Rumelia.

Uprisings against the Ottoman government occurred in the sanjak in 1572, 1584, 1585 and 1595. During the Great Turkish War, Austrian general Silvio Piccolomini burnt down Skopje in 1689.

In 1868 the Sanjak of Skopje together with the Sanjak of Prizren, Sanjak of Dibra and Sanjak of Niš became part of the newly established Prizren Vilayet. When Kosovo Vilayet was established in 1877, the Prizren Vilayet (without several nahiyas annexed by the Serbia) and its Sanjak of Skopje became part of Kosovo Vilayet, with Skopje as its seat.

According to the Ottoman General Census of 1881/82-1893, the kaza (sub-district) of Usküp had a total population of 70.170, consisting of 40.256 Muslims, 22.497 Bulgarians, 6.655 Greeks, 724 Jews and 38 Latins.

During the First Balkan War in 1912 and the beginning of 1913, the Sandzak of Skopje was liberated by the Kingdom of Serbia. On the basis of the Treaty of London signed during the London Conference in 1913, its territory became a part of Serbia.

== Demographics ==
Ethnoconfessional Groups in the Sanjak of Üsküp as per the 1881-1882 Census
1. Bulgarians (54.3%)
2. Muslims (42.5%)
3. Greeks and Serbs (2.70%)
4. Jews (0.50%)

According to the 1881–1882 and the 1905–1906 census of the Ottoman Empire, the population of the Sanjak of Üsküp is distributed, as follows:

Ethnoconfessional group
Ethnoconfessional group	Census of 1881-1882	%	Census of 1905-1906	%
Orthodox Bulgarians (Exarchists)	147,847	54.3	144,545	53.9
Muslims	115,858	42.5	113,603	42.3
Orthodox Greeks (Patriarchists)	7,248	2.7	8,606	3.2
Jews	1,234	0.5	1,198	0.4
Roman Catholics	46	0.0	605	0.2
Protestants	97	0.0	173	0.0
Armenians	1	0.0	1	0.0
Total	272,331	100.0	268,729	100.0

Ethnoconfessional Groups in the Sanjak of Üsküp as per the 1905-1906 Census
1. Bulgarians (53.9%)
2. Muslims (42.3%)
3. Greeks & Serbs (3.20%)
4. Jews (0.40%)
5. Miscellaneous (0.20%)

Furthermore, according to the Ottoman salname for 1903, the population is distributed, as follows:

- Bulgarians - 126,701
- Muslims - 94,006
- Greeks - 5,123
- Serbs - 4,843
- Others - N/A

== List of governors ==
The earliest governors, of the so-called Skopje krajište:

- Pasha Yiğit Bey: (1392–1414)
- Ishak Bey: (1414–1439)
- Nesuh Bey: (1439–1454)
- Isa-Beg Ishaković: (1454–1463)

Sanjakbeys:

- Mustafa Pasha Kara Mehmed-zade: (July 1755–?)
- Osman Pasha: (September 1844 – August 1845)
- Mehmed Selim Pasha Eneste Haseki: (August 1845 – March 1848)
- Hafiz Mehmed Pasha the Cherkessian: (March 1848 – May 1850)
- Ismail Pasha Paisli: (May 1850 – April 1851)
- Mustafa Tosun Pasha: (April 1851 – October 1853)
- Ali Riza Mehmed Pasha: (November 1853 – February 1854)
- Akif Pasha: (1857–?)
- Mahzar Osman Pasha Arnavut: (September 1858 – August 1859)
- Rustem Pasha Ebubekir: August 1859 – March 1860
- Alyanak Mustafa Pasha: (March 1860—July 1863)
- Mahmud Faiz Pasha: (July 1863 – January 1864)
- ?
- İsmail Hakkı Paşa Şehsüvarzade Leskovikli: (November 1865 – July 1869)
- ?
- Hafuz Pasha: (fl. 1876–1900)

== Literature ==
- Ağanoğlu, Yıldırım (2000). Salnâme-i Vilâyet-i Kosova: Yedinci defa olarak vilâyet matbaasında tab olunmuştur: 1896 (hicri 1314) Kosova vilâyet-i salnâmesi (Üsküp, Priştine, Prizren, İpek, Yenipazar, Taşlıca). İstanbul: Rumeli Türkleri Kültür ve Dayanışma Derneği.
