= Republican Alternative =

Republican Alternative may refer to:

- Republican Alternative Party (Azerbaijan) (Azerbaijani: Respublikaçı Alternativ Partiyası), Azerbaijani political party.
- Republican Alternative (Spain) (Spanish: Alternativa Republicana), Spanish political party.
