= Mustafa (disambiguation) =

Mustafa is a common Arabic male given name.

Mustafa may also refer to:

== Locations ==
- Mustafa Centre, a shopping mall in Singapore
- Si-Mustapha, a town in Algeria

=== Fictional locations ===
- Mustafar, a fictional exoplanet in the Star Wars universe

== People ==
- Musthafa (actor), Indian film actor
- Kama Mustafa or Charles Wright (born 1961), a former professional wrestler
- Mustafa Saed (born 1966), American professional wrestler
- Mustafa (born 1996), formerly known as Mustafa the Poet, Sudanese-Canadian poet, singer, songwriter, and filmmaker

=== Fictional characters ===
- Mustafa (Austin Powers), a character in Austin Powers
- Mustafa, a character in Ratatouille
- Mustafa, an Olympic medalist marksman from Syria in American Sniper

== Film ==
- Mustafa (film), a 2008 documentary by Can Dündar
- Musthaffaa, 1996 Indian film
- Ghulam-E-Mustafa, 1997 Indian film by Partho Ghosh

== Music ==
- "Mustapha" (Queen song), a song by Queen from their album Jazz
- An Egyptian multilingual song (also known as "Ya Mustafa") existing in many versions and languages

== Science ==
- Mustafa Prize a grand science and technology award established in 2015

== See also ==
- Mustafa Pasha (disambiguation)
- Ghulam Mustafa (disambiguation)
