= Ghulam Mustafa Khan =

Ghulam Mustafa Khan may refer to:

- Ghulam Mustafa Khan (literature scholar) (1912–2005), Pakistani writer and academic
- Ghulam Mustafa Khan (singer) (1931–2021), Indian Hindustani classical vocalist
- Ghulam Mustafa Khan (statistician) (1932–2016), Pakistani cricket administrator and statistician

== See also ==
- Ghulam Mustafa Khar, Pakistani politician and feudal lord
- Ghulam Mustafa (disambiguation)
- Ghulam Khan (disambiguation)
