= Miriam Butt =

Linguist

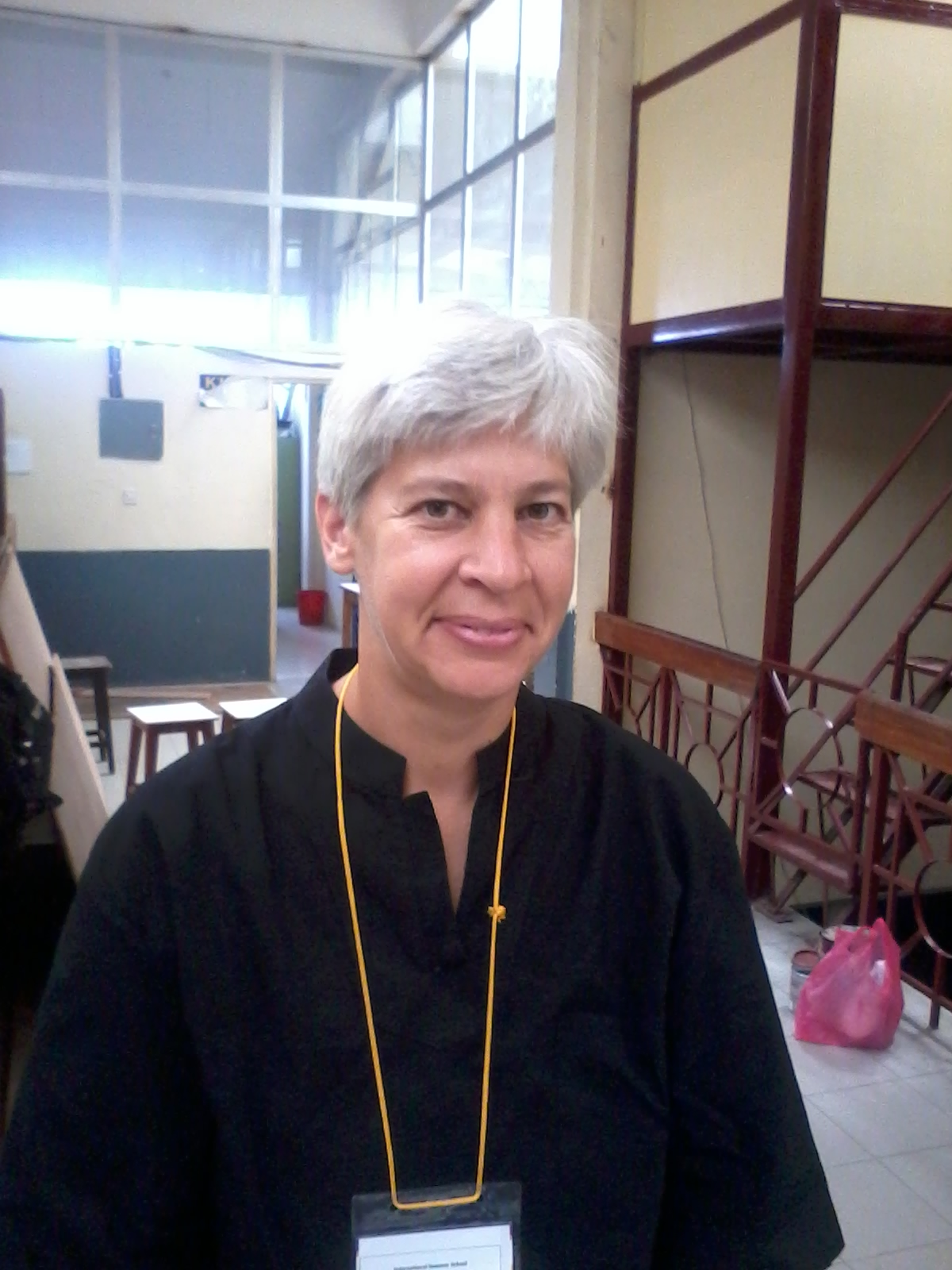
- Miriam Butt, University of Konstanz
- Occupation: Professor of Linguistics

Miriam Butt (b. 1966) is Professor of Linguistics at the Department of Linguistics (Fachbereich Sprachwissenschaft) at the University of Konstanz, where she leads the computational linguistics lab.

== Education and research ==
Butt earned her doctorate in linguistics in 1993 at Stanford University. She subsequently held research and teaching positions at the Institut für Maschinelle Sprachverarbeitung at the University of Stuttgart, University of Manchester Institute of Science and Technology and the University of Tübingen before taking up her current position at the University of Konstanz.

She is the author or editor of 11 books, including The Structure of Complex Predicates in Urdu, the published version of her Stanford dissertation, and the Theories of Case, a volume in the Cambridge Textbooks in Linguistics series. She is best known for her theoretical linguistic work on complex predicates and on grammatical case, and for her computational linguistic work in large-scale grammar development within the ParGram project. Her Pargram work in large-scale grammar development focuses on grammars for English, German, and Urdu (Butt et al. 1999).

Butt is also one of the authors of 6000 Kilometer Sehnsucht, which describes her childhood in Saudi Arabia and Pakistan.

== Honors ==
Butt was elected to the Academia Europaea in 2019. She was elected to AcademiaNet in 2012.

In 2026, Butt was the recipient of a joint festschrift (with Tracy Holloway King) with the title Parallelism, Interconnection, and Complementary Distribution.

== Selected publications ==
- Butt, Miriam & Aditi Lahiri. 2013. Diachronic pertinacity of light verbs. Lingua. doi:10.1016/j.lingua.2012.11.006
- Butt, Miriam & Tafseer Ahmed. 2011. The redevelopment of Indo-Aryan case systems from a lexical semantic perspective. Morphology 21(3): 545-572. https://doi.org/10.1007/s11525-010-9175-0
- Butt, Miriam. 2006. Theories of Case. Cambridge: Cambridge University Press. https://doi.org/10.1017/CBO9781139164696
- Butt, Miriam, Tracy Holloway King, Maria-Eugenia Niño & Frederique Segond. 1999. A Grammar Writer's Cookbook. Stanford, CA: CSLI Publications. ISBN 9781575861715
- Butt, Miriam. 1995. The Structure of Complex Predicates in Urdu. Stanford, CA: CSLI Publications. ISBN 9781575869902.
