= Siege of Novo Brdo (1455) =

Ottoman/Serbian military conflict

- Part of the 1455 Ottoman invasion of Serbia
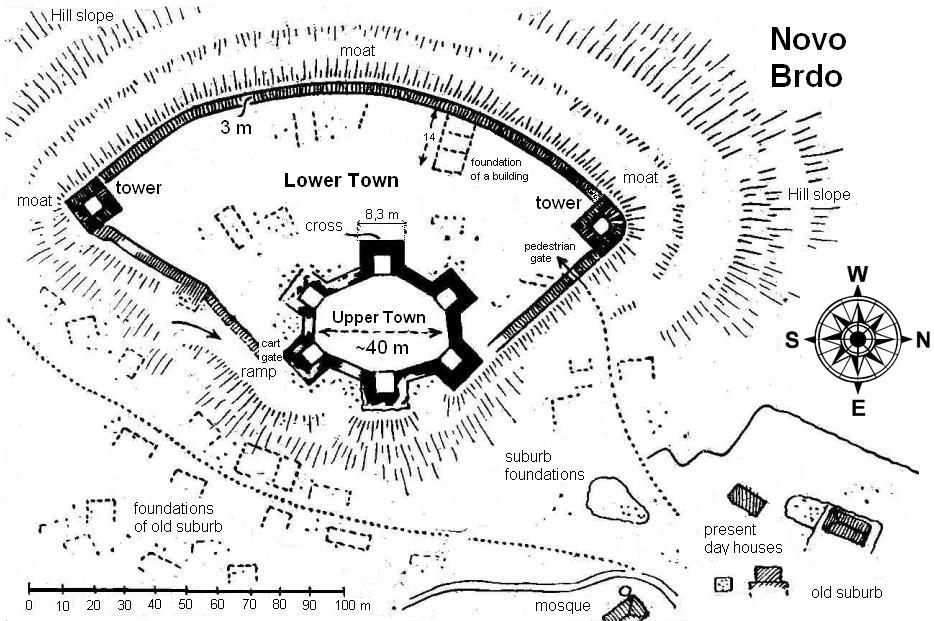
- Novo Brdo Fortress Layout
Date	May – June 1455
Location	Serbian Despotate, Novo Brdo 42°36′N 21°26′E
Result	Ottoman victory

Belligerents
Ottoman Empire	Serbian Despotate

Commanders and leaders
Mehmed the Conqueror; Ishak Bey	Demetrios Jakšic; Konstantin Mihailović

Strength
50,000	Unknown

Casualties and losses
Unknown	Heavy troop losses: All the people of the castle were taken prisoner; 320 people were recruited to the Janissaries; 700 Serbian women were conscripted into the army

The siege of Novo Brdo was a successful siege led by Mehmed the Conqueror and Ishak Bey on Novo Brdo, defended by Demetrios Jakšic, during the Second Serbian campaign in 1455.

== Siege ==
The Sultan set out from Edirne and arrived in front of the castle via Sofia. Konstantin Mihailović, who would later become a Serbian janissary, explains that he started resistance against the Ottomans.

Initially, the Sultan sent an offer to the castle's defenders to surrender, which was delivered by Isak Bey to the castle in person. After the castle's commander refused the city was besieged.

The Sultan blockaded the city and began to besiege it by setting up his cannons. When the Serbian ruler Branković heard of the siege, he did not know what to do and fortified all the other fortresses.

The siege lasted for 40 days throughout May and June, and continued despite threats by the Hungarians.

== Aftermath ==
The surrender agreement stated that the inhabitants of the city would be permitted to remain within its walls, but this right was only granted to the miners, whose work was essential. The notables of the city were executed; 320 young men were recruited into the Janissaries and 700 Serbian women were enlisted into the army. The roof of St. Nicholas Church, popularly known as the Saxon church, was removed along with its bells. In 1467, the rest of the people were taken to Istanbul. The Ottoman colony established in the conquered city could not prevent its cultural and economic decline. Novo Brdo, which became noteworthy as the eventual site of an Ottoman mint, maintained its importance until the reign of Murad IV.
