= Siege of Novo Brdo (1440–1441) =

Military blockade of Novo Brdo

- Part of the Serbian–Ottoman wars
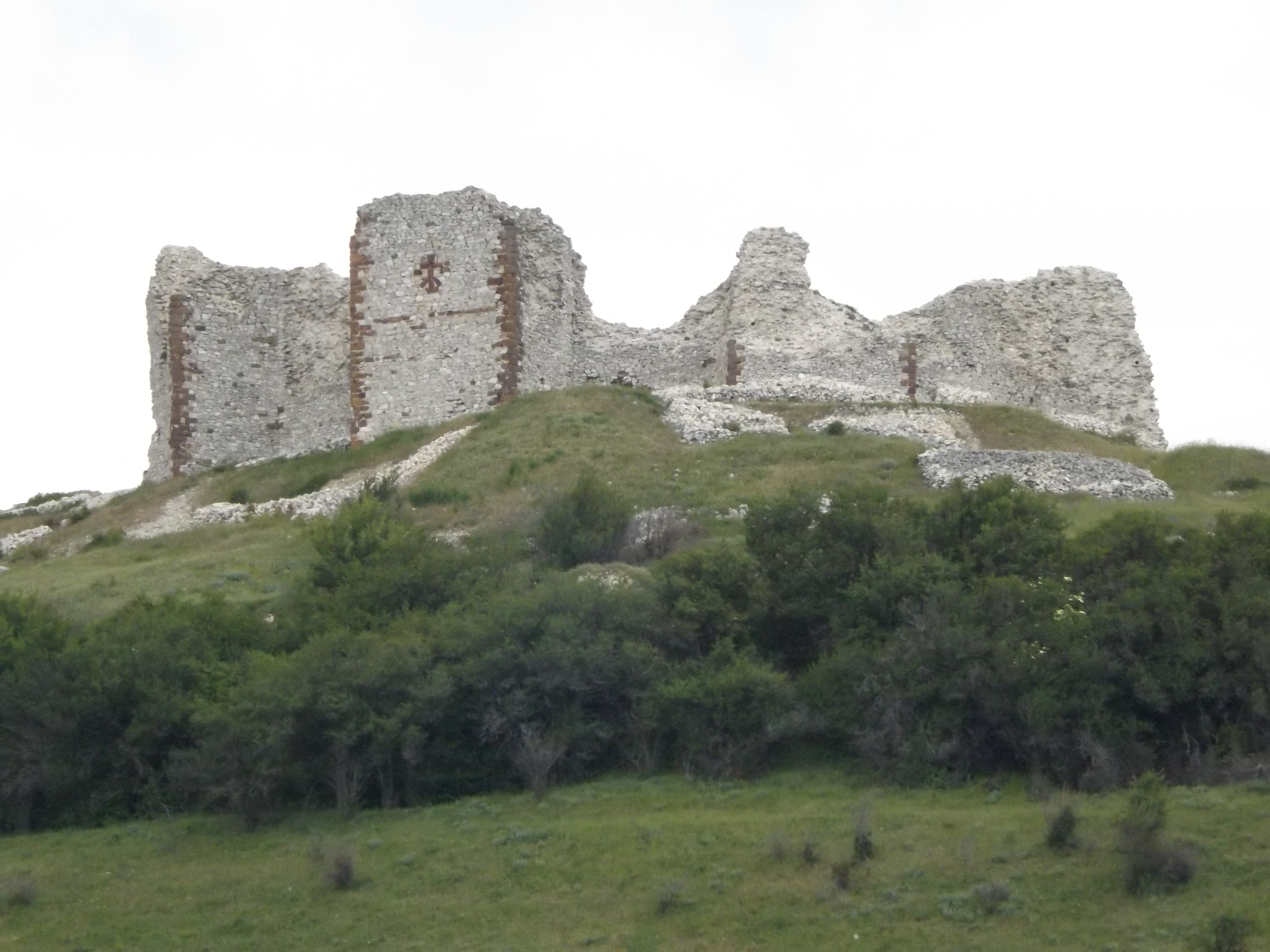
- Remnants of the Novo Brdo Fortress
Date	October 1440 – 27 June 1441
Location	Novo Brdo, Serbian Despotate 42°36′54″N 21°25′02″E
Result	Ottoman victory

Belligerents
Ottoman Empire	Serbian Despotate supported by: Republic of Ragusa

Commanders and leaders
(Ottoman Empire) Murad II (Ottoman Empire) Şehabeddin Pasha	Prijezda

Casualties and losses
Unknown	Heavy casualties of the population of Novo Brdo

The siege of Novo Brdo was a military blockade of Novo Brdo, an important fortified mining town in the Serbian Despotate, by the forces of the Ottoman Empire. The siege began in 1440 and lasted until the capture of the fortress on 27 June 1441. During the siege, the Serbian garrison was supported by the local community of citizens of the Republic of Ragusa.

== Background ==
Novo Brdo was one of the largest cities in the Balkans, and because of its rich gold and silver mines it was the most important non-coastal city in the Balkans in the 14th and 15th centuries. The Ottomans besieged it without success in 1412 and in 1427 using cannons they'd constructed for the 1422 siege of Constantinople.

In 1439, Ottoman forces led by Sultan Murad II attacked the Serbian Despotate. Serbian Despot Đurađ Branković fled to Hungary to seek support for the defense of his realm, organized by his son Grgur. During the siege of Smederevo (the Despotate's capital city) in 1439, Murad II ordered the marcher-lord Ishak-Beg, who was returning from the hajj pilgrimage to Mecca, to join forces with Hadım Şehabeddin and besiege Novo Brdo.

On 6 August 1439, the Ottoman forces under Ishak-Beg defeated Serbian forces near Novo Brdo. The Ottomans captured Smederevo on 18 August 1439, reducing the territory of the Serbian Despotate to Zeta and a region around Novo Brdo. The forces under Murad II joined Ishak-Beg to attack Novo Brdo, but its garrison successfully repelled their attacks. The Ottomans realized that it would be difficult to capture the well-defended Novo Brdo, so Murad II ordered for retreat and a stay in Skopje during the winter. Before they did so, they robbed caravans of Ragusan merchants, while Murad II went to Adrianople.

The Ottomans allowed Grgur Branković to govern his father's former estates in southern Serbia, as an Ottoman vassal.

== Siege ==
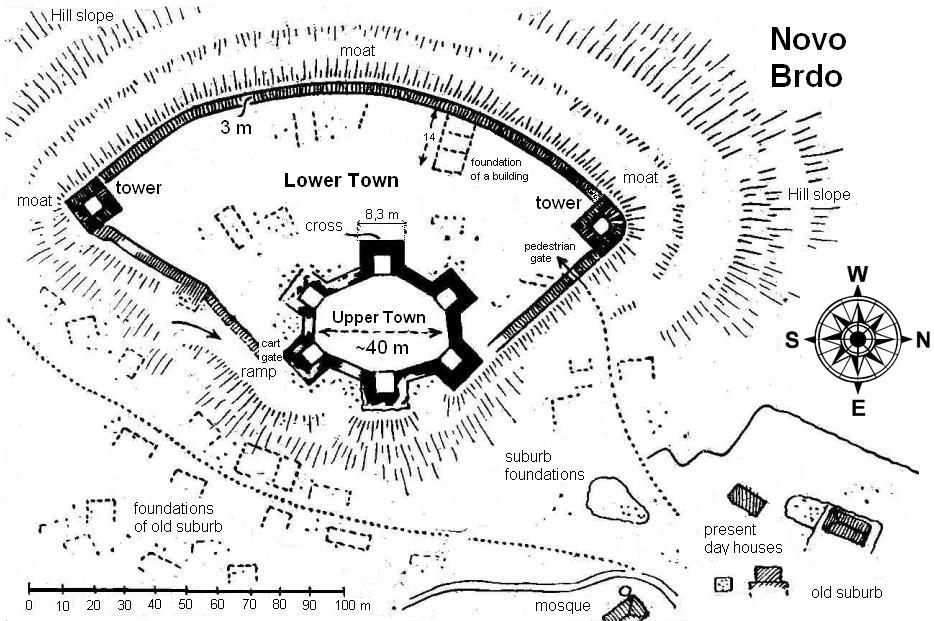
The layout of the Novo Brdo Fortress

In 1440, after the failure at Belgrade, the Ottoman forces commanded by the beylerbey (the Lord of Lords) of Rumelia Eyalet, Hadım Şehabeddin, again besieged Novo Brdo.

The garrisoned Serbian forces were also supported by citizens of the Republic of Ragusa, Ragusa having instructed their subjects in Novo Brdo to help defend the town. Ragusans, who were predominantly merchants, were practically forced to resist the Ottomans because otherwise their property in Novo Brdo would be confiscated, like it was in the case of Ragusan merchants who happened to be outside of the town when the siege began and refused to return to it.

Despot Đurađ Branković and his wife traveled from Hungary to Zeta, accompanied with several hundred cavalry and Albanian vojvoda Petar Spani. They first went to Zagreb, to Đurađ's sister Katarina who was the wife of Ulrich II, Count of Celje. Then Branković arrived at Ragusa (Dubrovnik) at the end of July 1440 and after several days he continued his journey toward his coastal towns of Budva and Bar which became the new capital of the remaining part of his despotate. In the period between 1 July 1440 and his arrival at Bar, the Ottoman forces defeated some military units from Novo Brdo in a battle near Makreš (a village near modern-day Gnjilane).

In August 1440, Branković arrived at Bar where he stayed until the end of the winter 1440–41. There he tried to mobilize forces to recapture the territory of the Serbian Despotate he lost to the Ottomans. At the same time, Branković maintained communication with the garrison in Novo Brdo and his son Grgur, who at the time was an Ottoman governor. That was one of the main reasons why the Ottomans, probably justifiably, accused Grgur of treason and dismissed him from his governorship in April 1441. On 8 May 1441, both Grgur and his brother Stefan were blinded, based on the order of Sultan Murad II. Branković faced another disappointment in Zeta where he found out that the Crnojevići rebelled against vojvoda Komnen, the governor of Zeta. Branković left Zeta in April 1441 and resided in Ragusa for a while. This angered the Ottomans who requested, through their envoy Agub, that Ragusa should hand over Branković. Ragusans refused this request and explained in a letter to Ishak-Beg and Hadım Şehabeddin that Ragusa has not accepted Branković because he was an enemy of the sultan but because it was a free city that accepts anybody who seeks shelter in it. They also emphasized that Branković being in Ragusa is the best guarantee that he would not undertake any action against the Ottomans. Ragusans wanted to send their diplomats to Hadım Şehabeddin and requested his written guarantee for their safe conduct. On 13 June 1441 Hadım Şehabeddin, who was in Vučitrn at the time, issued the requested guarantee to the Ragusans.

During the siege of Novo Brdo its population suffered heavy casualties. On 27 June 1441 Novo Brdo surrendered to the Ottoman forces, who then robbed and burned the captured town.

== Aftermath ==
Đurađ Branković received the news about the fall of Novo Brdo when he was in Zeta. Stephen Vukčić, who was an Ottoman vassal at that time, used the weak position of the Serbian Despot and tried to capture Zeta. After he successfully penetrated into Zeta highlands, the Venetian Republic captured Zeta's coastal cities and regions based on agreement with Despot Branković that they will protect his possessions from falling under Ottoman control. Branković realized that he lost all of his territory and power base which supplied him with troops necessary to secure his suzerainty, so he moved to his estates in Hungary. Eventually, Zeta fell under control of the local tribes, with the Crnojevići noble family trying to assert their dominance. The Ottomans made significant efforts to again raise Novo Brdo and gave substantial privileges to people who settled in it and worked in its mines while its Serb citizens were awarded with trading privileges. Within the next three years the Ottomans re-established the mint in Novo Brdo which began to strike akçe for the first time.

In 1444, during the Crusader Long Campaign, Novo Brdo was recaptured from the Ottomans and again became a part of the reestablished Serbian Despotate until it finally fell to Ottoman control on 1 June 1455. Among the survivors of the siege was Dimitrije Kantakouzenos. In 1455, the Ottomans forced the besieged to surrender because they used heavy artillery. All men of any distinguished rank or importance were decapitated under orders of sultan Mehmed II. An estimated 320 boys were taken to become janissaries (devşirme). Approximately 700 girls and young women were given to Ottoman soldiers and their commanders. The siege and its aftermath were described in Memoirs of a janissary, written in 1490—1501 by Novo Brdo resident Konstantin Mihailović, who was one of the boys taken. In 1455 the last voivode of Serbian despot in Novo Brdo was Lješ Spanović.

== Notes ==
1. Some Ottoman chronicles gives 1439 as year of Ottoman capture of Novo Brdo, while scholarly consensus accept the other primary sources and Serbian chronicles which set 1441 as a date of the fall of Novo Brdo.

== Sources ==
- Babinger, Franz (1992). Mehmed the Conqueror and His Time. Princeton University Press. ISBN 0-691-01078-1.
- Božić, Ivan (1952). Дубровник и Турска у XIV и XV веку. Научна књига.
- Ćirković, Sima (2004). The Serbs. Malden: Blackwell Publishing. ISBN 9781405142915.
- Fine, John V. A. (1994) [1987]. The Late Medieval Balkans: A Critical Survey from the Late Twelfth Century to the Ottoman Conquest. Ann Arbor, Michigan: University of Michigan Press. ISBN 978-0-472-10079-8.
- Jefferson, John (2012). The Holy Wars of King Wladislas and Sultan Murad: The Ottoman-Christian Conflict from 1438-1444. BRILL. ISBN 978-90-04-21904-5.
- SANU (1980). Glas.
- Setton, Kenneth M. (1978). The Papacy and the Levant (1204–1571), Volume II: The Fifteenth Century. Vol. 2. Philadelphia: The American Philosophical Society. ISBN 0-87169-127-2.
