= Ghulam Khan (disambiguation) =

Ghulam Khan is a town in North Waziristan, Pakistan.

Ghulam Khan may also refer to:

- Ghulam Abid Khan (born 1972), Pakistani politician
- Ghulam Ali Khan (1817–1852), Indian painter
- Bade Ghulam Ali Khan (1902–1968), Indian classical singer
- Ghulam Dastgir Khan, Pakistani politician
- Ghulam Faruque Khan (1899–1992), Pakistani politician and industrialist
- Ghulam Ghaus Khan (died 2005), Indian freedom fighter
- Ghulam Ishaq Khan (1915–2006), seventh President of Pakistan
- Ghulam Jilani Khan (1925–1999), former Governor of Punjab Province and Defence Secretary of Pakistan
- Ghulam Mohammad Khan (born 1923), Indian politician, social worker and industrialist
- Ghulam Mohammed Khan, Indian equestrian
- Ghulam Mohiuddin Khan (died 1969), sixth prince of Arcot, India
- Ghulam Muhammad Khan (1763–1828), Nawab of Rampur
- Ghulam Murtaza Khan (1760–1840), Indian painter
- Ghulam Mustafa Khan (disambiguation)
  - Ghulam Mustafa Khan (literature scholar) (1912–2005), Pakistani linguist, author, scholar, educationist and spiritual leader
  - Ghulam Mustafa Khan (singer) (born 1931), Indian Hindustani classical musician
- Ghulam Sadiq Khan (1939–2016), Indian classical music singer
- Ghulam Sarwar Khan (born 1955), Pakistani politician
- Guz Khan (born Ghulam Khan, 1986) or Guzzy Bear, English comedian and actor
