= Hina Pervaiz Butt =

Pakistani politician (born 1982)

Hina Parvez Butt
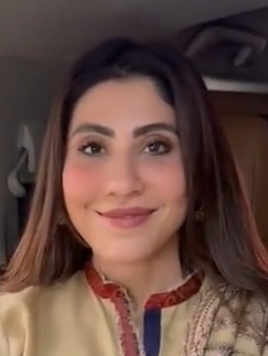
- Butt in 2025

Chairperson of the Punjab Women Protection Authority
- Incumbent
- Assumed office 11 July 2024
- Preceded by: Rafia Kamal

Member of the Provincial Assembly
- Incumbent
- Assumed office 27 February 2024
- Constituency: Reserved seat for women
- In office 15 August 2018 – 14 January 2023
- Constituency: Reserved seat for women
- In office 29 May 2013 – 31 May 2018
- Constituency: Reserved seat for women

Personal details
- Born: 19 January 1982 (age 44) Lahore, Punjab, Pakistan
- Party: PML-N (2013-present)

Hina Parvez Butt (Urdu: حنا پرویز بٹ; born 19 January 1982) is a Pakistani politician affiliated with the Pakistan Muslim League–Nawaz (PML-N). She has served as the Chairperson of the Punjab Women Protection Authority and as a Member of Provincial Assembly of Punjab since May 2013, representing a reserved seat for women.

== Early life and education ==
Butt was born on 19 January 1982 in Lahore, Punjab, Pakistan.

She received her initial education from Convent of Jesus and Mary, Lahore. She earned the degrees of Bachelor of Science (Hons) in 2004 and received the degree of Master of Business Administration in 2010 from the Lahore University of Management Sciences (LUMS). In 2016, she earned a Master of Arts in International Relations from Middlesex University campus in Dubai.

== Political career ==
She was elected to the Provincial Assembly of the Punjab as a candidate of Pakistan Muslim League (N) (PML-N) on a reserved seat for women in the 2013 Pakistani general election.

She was re-elected to the Provincial Assembly of the Punjab as a candidate of PML-N on a reserved seat for women in the 2018 Pakistani general election.

Ahead of the 2024 Pakistani general election, which was marred by allegations of electoral rigging in favour of PML-N, Butt was included on the party's list of female legislators designated for reserved seats in the Provincial Assembly of the Punjab, submitted to the Election Commission of Pakistan (ECP). Following this, she had to encounter opposition from female PML-N leaders during a parliamentary board meeting. They criticized the allocation of reserved seat tickets solely to relatives and expressed discontent with the party being represented by individuals solely donning "branded suits and makeup."

Following the election, she took oath as a member of the Provincial Assembly of the Punjab through a reserved quota for women.

In July 2024, she was appointed chairperson of the Punjab Women Protection Authority by Maryam Nawaz, the Chief Minister of Punjab, for a three-year term.
