= Pamposh Bhat =

Indian environmentalist

- Born: 19 September 1958 (age 68); Bhopal, Madhya Pradesh, India
- Occupations: Managing trustee, jwala trust for sustainable development
- Spouse: S. L. Bhat
- Children: Two
- Parent(s): Dulari and J.N Sarup

Pamposh Bhat (born 19 September 1958) is a New Delhi–based environmentalist and award-winning writer.

== Education and career ==
Bhat studied at St. Joseph's Convent at Bhopal and attended the University of Bhopal (now Barkatullah University) where she studied Science as an undergraduate student and was awarded an MSc in Chemistry by the University.

She began her career at the University of Kashmir as a research scholar engaged by the University Grants Commission on a Phytochemistry research Project. She developed a strong interest in environmental policy during her tenure as a researcher and joined the United Nations Asia and Pacific Centre for Transfer of Technology (UN-APCTT) of the United Nations Economic and Social Commission for Asia and the Pacific. At UN-APCTT she worked to promote the use of renewable energy and environmentally sound technologies in the country. During her time at UN-APCTT she also edited VATIS Update a journal of technological developments and events in the field of Non-conventional Energy. She is married to a prominent IAS officer of J&K S.L Bhat who is currently the chief of JK Public Service Commission.

Bhat joined GTZ-India, a German bilateral development agency in 2003. Her mandate at GTZ-India was to promote the Clean Development Mechanism (CDM) in the country and help build a sustainable carbon market in India.

An expert on climate change and renewable energy policy, she also held position of the country manager of the BMU CMD/JI Initiative in India. As an expert on the CDM, she has been retained as a climate policy advisor by the Indian states of Madhya Pradesh, Rajasthan and West Bengal.She is currently working as an advisor, climate change adaptation program, International Finance Corporation, world bank group and is a member of International advisory board of Abengoa, a company in the energy and environment sectors, generating energy from the sun, producing biofuels, desalinating sea water and recycling industrial waste.

Bhat headed DFID Indo-British Climate Change Innovation Program and supported states of Maharashtra, Kerala, Odisha, Bihar, Assam and Chhattisgarh in developing state action plans for climate change and introduce concept of climate financing and prepare projects for national and International climate financing. She is at present heading India-EU clean energy and climate change partnership project which aims to cooperate on clean energy, sustainable development and climate related initiatives and support India in the implementation of the NDC's under Paris Agreement.

Active in public life, she serves as the chairperson of the board of trustees for Jwala, a civil society group that seeks to promote renewable energy and energy efficiency in India. She is a former member of the governing council of the Solar Energy Society of India. At present she is a member of the Central Electricity Regulatory Commission advisory committee.

== Creative writing ==
Bhat has penned two collections of poems, Trishna (1995) and Kshitij Ki Khoj Mein (1993). Kshitij Ki Khoj Mein was adjudged the winner of the Rajbhasha Award as the best entry by a vernacular author writing in Hindi.

In 2000, her short story Bub was made into an eponymous feature film Bub, only the third feature film in the language and the first in 38 years. The Film was awarded the Nargis Dutt Award for Best Feature Film on National Integration in the 2002 National Film Awards by the President of India.

== Awards ==
- Bhat has been awarded the prestigious Rajbhasha Award for Poetry in 1995 for her work "Kshitij Ki Khoj Mein" (In search of the Horizon).

== Publications ==
=== Academic writing ===
- Pamposh Bhat "Carbon Markets: The Post Copenhagen Scenario" PricewaterhouseCoopers Pvt Ltd and Multi Commodity Exchange of India Ltd's Commodity Insights Yearbook 2010
- Pamposh Bhat and Moksha Bhat, "Climate change: The way forward" in Reality Check on Environmental Change: A Multidimensional Study on its Impacts, Times Foundation/[Times of India Group], India. May 2010
- Mikael Henzler, Peter Siegenthaler and Pamposh Bhat, Bamboo as a Resource for Sustainable Development in Asia: Concept Paper on behalf of UNDP, UNDP, New Delhi, 1999
- Mikael Henzler and Pamposh Bhat, Impacts of Vegetable Dyes on Indian Textile Industries: Market Assessment on behalf of UNDP, UNDP, New Delhi, 1999
- Pamposh Bhat and Dr. M. L. Raina, Annual Report of the Research Project 1989 titled 'Chemical investigation of Aquatic Plants in Kashmir', University Grants Commission, New Delhi, 1989
- Pamposh Bhat and Dr. M. L. Raina, Chemical investigation of Aquatic Plants in Kashmir, Indian Chemical Society Journal, August 1989;
- Pamposh Bhat and Dr. M. L. Raina, Further Chemical Studies of Polygonum Linn, Planta Medica, July 1989

=== Poetry ===
- Trishna, Limited Circulation, Self Published, New Delhi, 1995
- Kshitij Ki Khoj Mein (In Search of the Horizon), Limited Circulation, Self Published, New Delhi, 1993
