= Aytan Mustafayeva =

Azerbaijani politician (born 1968)

Member of the National Assembly for Yasamal İki̇nci̇
- In office 1 November 2015 – 2020
- Succeeded by: Erkin Gadirli

Personal details
- Born: Aytən İnqlab qızı 23 June 1968 (age 58) Baku, Azerbaijan Soviet Socialist Republic
- Party: Independent
- Spouse: Roshen Mustafayev (d. 2009)
- Education: Baku State University

Aytən Inglab gizi Mustafayeva (born 23 May 1968) is an Azerbaijani Independent politician who was a member of the National Assembly. She was elected at the 2015 Azerbaijani parliamentary election.

== Early life ==
Mustafayeva graduated in 1990 with honours from the Faculty of Oriental Studies at Baku State University.

== Political career ==
Mustafayeva was elected to the Parliament of Azerbaijan in 2015.

== Personal life ==
She was married to political scientist Roshen Mustafayev until his death in 2009. She remarried in 2016.

She is fluent in Russian, Turkish, English and Persian.
