= U. R. Bhat =

Indian economist

Ullal Ravindra "U. R." Bhat is a noted economic columnist of India. He had his education in IIT Kanpur. He joined Indian Bank and quit to start a career in financial investments. He worked in Jardine Fleming India as head of the country operations. He is a regular at NDTV Profit Television channel. He works for Dalton Capital Advisors (India) Pvt. Ltd. He is also a director of Karnataka Bank. He belongs to tulu speaking Shivalli Madhva Brahmin community.
