= Ghulam Mustafa (general) =

- Military career
- Allegiance: Pakistan
- Branch: Pakistan Army
- Service years: 1968–2005
- Rank: Lieutenant General
- Unit: Artillery Regiment
- Commands: ASFC; I Strike Corps, Mangla; 11th Infantry Division, Lahore
- Conflicts: Indo-Pakistani War of 1971
- Awards: Hilal-e-Imtiaz (Military); Sitara-e-Eisaar; Tamgha-e-Basalat

Ghulam Mustafa is a retired three-star general of the Pakistan Army. He is credited with raising the Army Strategic Forces Command. He was born in an Arain Family.
