= Rahma El Siddig Mustafa =

Sudanese disability rights activist

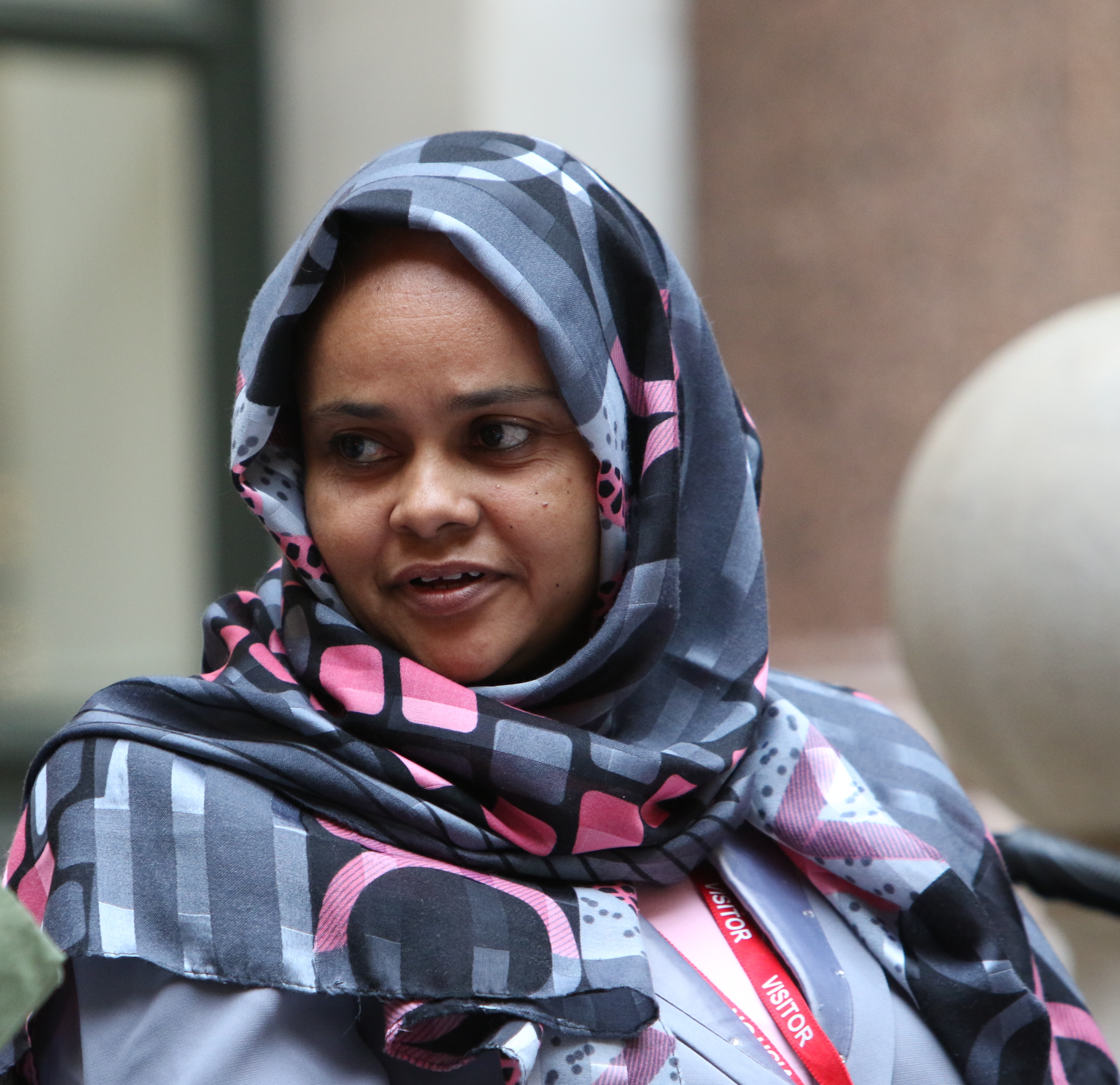
- Mustafa, at the Week of Women panel discussion and networking event hosted by DFID in London, 17 November 2016
- Known for: Disability rights advocacy

Rahma El Siddig Gasm Elbari Mustafa, more commonly known as Rahma El Siddig Mustafa or Rahma Mustafa, is a Sudanese disability rights activist.

She is best known for objecting to being charged an extra boarding fee by Cambodian airline Bassaka Air because she is a wheelchair user.

== Early life and background ==
Rahma El Siddig Gasm Elbari Mustafa (born circa 1980s) is a Sudanese disability rights activist and advocate. She is best known for challenging discrimination in air travel and for her leadership in the global movement for accessibility and inclusion. Mustafa hails from Sudan and uses a wheelchair, which has shaped both her personal experiences and her activism in disability rights advocacy.

== Personal life ==
In September 2015, Mustafa made the news after she was charged US$240 extra to board a Bassaka Air flight from Siem Reap to Phnom Penh because she uses a wheelchair and needed assistant board the aircraft. The initial news reporting led to accusations of blame being traded between the airline and the Cambodia Airport Management Service Company.

The charge led to an investigation by the Cambodian Disability Action Council to assess if there was a breach of Cambodian legislation.

== Career ==
In 2016, Mustafa was a program manager for ADD International (formally: Action on Disability and Development). She was a panelist at the UK Department for International Development's panel discussion and networking event on the 17 November 2016.

In 2018, she was awarded a fellowship from the International Disability Alliance Switzerland to study disability rights at the Centre for Disability Law and Policy, part of the National University of Ireland.

In 2019, she represented the Sudan National Union of Persons with Physical Disability, at a conference on the Convention on the Rights of Persons with Disabilities and the Sustainable Development Goals.

In 2020, Mustafa was a panelist at the United Nations Economic and Social Council event Inclusive Humanitarian Action = Effective Humanitarian Action.

== Selected publications ==
- Mustafa, R & Ouertani, I, October 2021, Tigray Refugees with Disabilities in Eastern Sudan Camps, Islamic Relief
