= Moustapha Bokoum =

Belgian footballer

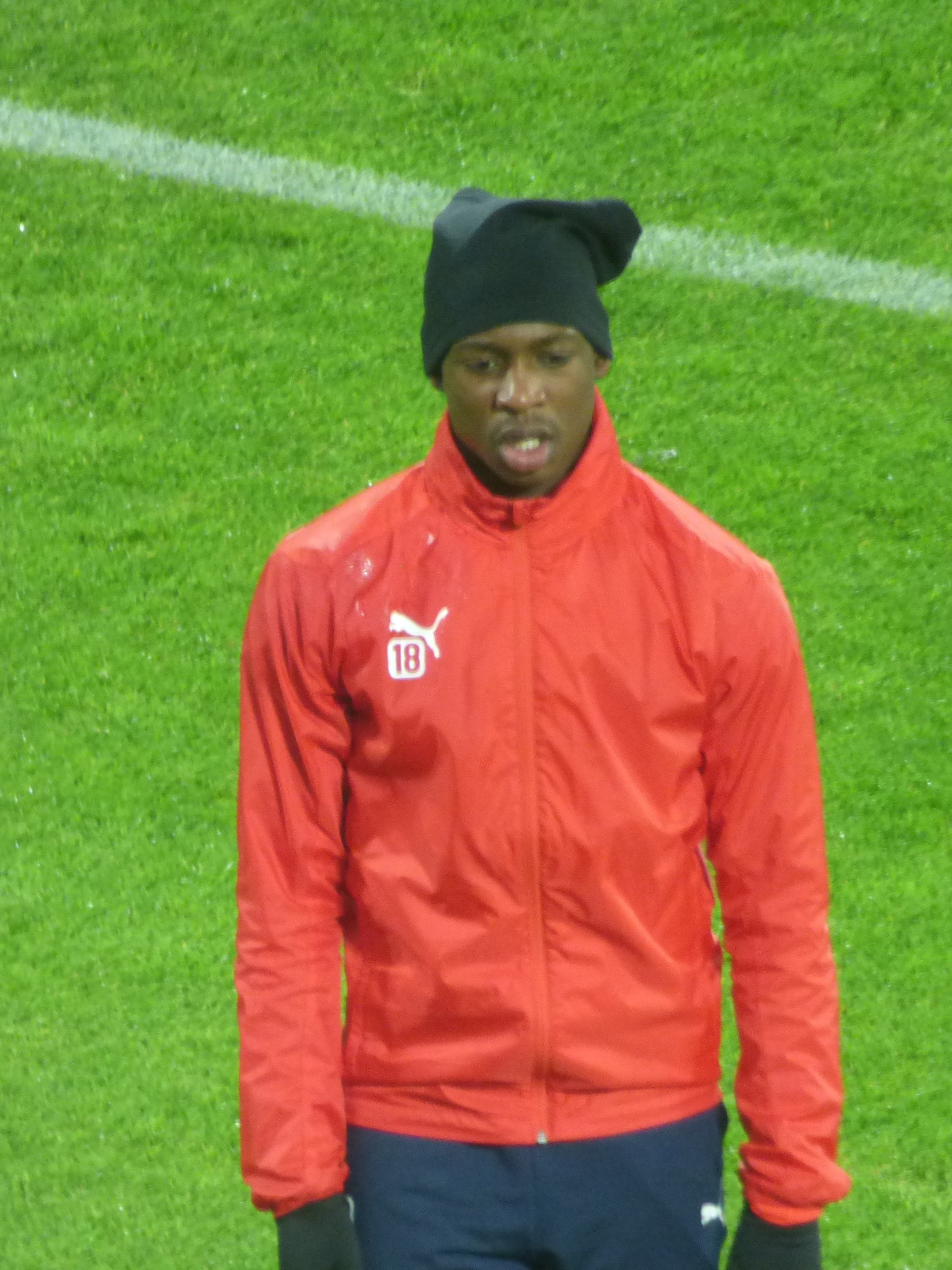
- Bokoum in 2019

Personal information
- Date of birth: 5 August 1999 (age 27)
- Place of birth: Brussels, Belgium
- Height: 1.78 m (5 ft 10 in)
- Position: Forward

Youth career
- 2013–2016: Club Brugge
- 2016–2018: Gent

Senior career*
Years	Team	Apps	(Gls)
2018–2019	Béziers	4	(0)
2020	Gent	0	(0)

International career
- Belgium U17
- * Club domestic league appearances and goals as of 23 January 2020

Moustapha Bokoum (born 5 August 1999) is a Belgian professional footballer who plays as a forward.

== Club career ==
After ascending the youth ranks at Gent, Bokoum began attracting the attention of several English and Italian teams. In June 2018, he signed a professional contract with newly promoted Ligue 2 side Béziers. The deal was for two years, with the option of a third. He made his professional debut on 3 August, replacing Rayane Aabid in the closing minutes of a 1–0 defeat to AC Ajaccio. He left the club by the end of the 2018–19 season.

Bokoum remained without club until 24 January 2020, where he returned to K.A.A. Gent. Bokoum played with Gent's reserve team until left the club at the end of his contract on 30 June 2020. He also suffered a serious knee injury in the same summer, which would keep him sidelined for about 6–8 months.

== International career ==
Bokoum is a youth international for Belgium, representing his country of birth several times at the under-17 level.

Born to a Guinean mother and a Congolese father, he is eligible to represent either nation at the senior level. He has retained a Guinean passport.
