= Erdek (disambiguation) =

Erdek is a municipality and district of Balıkesir Province, Turkey.

Erdek may also refer to:

- Erdek, Çorum, village in Turkey
- Erdek Gulf, a gulf of Marmara Sea, Turkey

Erdek Naval Base

== See also ==
- Erdik (disambiguation)
