= Ion layer gas reaction =

Ion layer gas reaction (ILGAR®) is a non-vacuum, thin-film deposition technique developed and patented by the group of Professor Dr. Christian-Herbert Fischer at the Helmholtz-Zentrum Berlin for materials and energy in Berlin, Germany. It is a sequential and cyclic process that enables the deposition of semiconductor thin films, mainly for (although not restricted to) photovoltaic applications, specially chalcopyrite absorber layers and buffer layers. The ILGAR technique was awarded as German High Tech Champion 2011 by the Fraunhofer Society.

ILGAR is a chemical process that allows for the deposition of layers in a homogeneous, adherent and mechanically stable form without using vacuum or high temperatures. It is a sequential and cyclic process which can be automated and scaled up. It consists basically of the following steps:

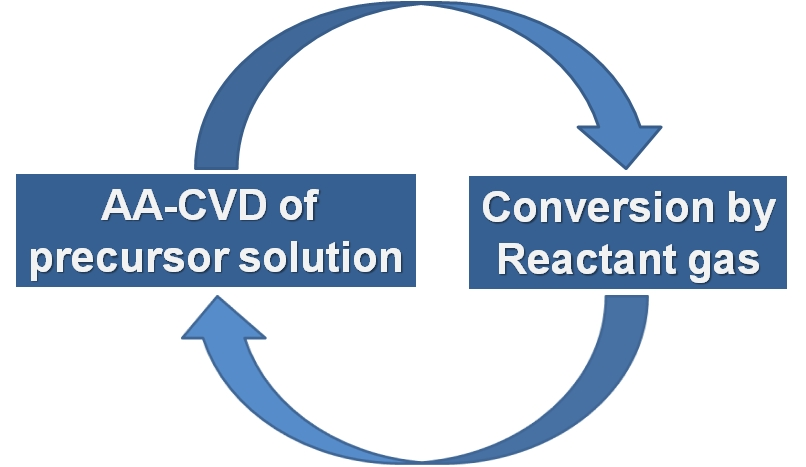
Schematic diagram showing the steps of the spray ILGAR process. Note the sequential and cyclic nature of the process.

- Application of a precursor solution on a substrate by dipping (Dip-ILGAR) or spraying (Spray ILGAR).
- Reaction of the dry solid precursor layer with a hydrogen chalcogenide gas.

These steps are repeated until the desired layer thickness is obtained.

In the case of spray-ILGAR, the spray deposition of the ionic layer is performed using similar equipment to atmospheric pressure aerosol assisted chemical vapour deposition or spray pyrolysis.

Spray pyrolysis can be regarded as a simplified version of the spray ILGAR process, where there is no reaction of the precursor layer with a reactant gas.

The cyclical nature of this process makes it similar to atomic layer deposition (ALD), which is also used for buffer layer deposition.

== Applications ==
The applications of the ILGAR and spray-pyrolysis techniques at the Helmholtz-Zentrum Berlin lie mainly in the field of chalcopyrite thin-film solar cells, although these techniques can be used for other applications involving substrate coating with thin films. The following list summarizes the applications of these techniques:

- Buffer layers for chalcopyrite-based thin-film devices: Replacement of the standard CdS by ecologically more favorable materials (In_{2}S_{3}, Zn(O,S) etc.) deposited using Spray-ILGAR on different absorber materials.
- Nano-dots passivation layers: nanodots can be deposited in a controlled way using the spray ILGAR technique. ZnS nanodots have been used as passivation layers-point contact buffer layers in chalcopyrite based thin-film solar cells. These dots (5–10 nm in diameter) act as a passivation layer at the absorber-buffer interface which results is some cases in an efficiency gain up to 2% absolute.
- Al_{2}O_{3} barrier layers: Thin-film solar modules on metallic substrates like steel foil need a barrier layer between substrate and Mo back-contact for electrical insulation and to prevent a detrimental iron diffusion into the absorber. Also uncontrolled sodium diffusion from the glass substrate can be stopped by a barrier before intentionally doping the absorber with the desired amount of sodium. Al_{2}O_{3} layers deposited by spray-pyrolysis result in fully functioning barrier layers for the cases stated above
- ZnO Window layers: high quality i-ZnO window layers have been grown by spray pyrolysis and constitute a feasible replacement of the standard sputtered i-ZnO layers.
- Chalcopyrite absorber layers: Spray-ILGAR is a low temperature technique that enables the growth of chalcopyrite absorber layers such as CuInS_{2} and Cu(In,Ga)S_{2}. Spray-ILGAR CuInS_{2} layers can be used as absorbers in thin-film solar cells.
- Surface Coating: The surface coating of ceramics, metal, glass and even plastics for catalytic purposes as well as anti-corrosion, antistatic or mechanical protection is feasible using the ILGAR technique.

=== ILGAR as a replacement for chemical bath deposition ===
The advantage of ILGAR compared to chemical bath deposition (CBD) lies in the fact that it is easier to deposit high quality precursor layers and convert them to the chalcogenide than to directly deposit chalcogenide thin films. It is also possible to grow films with graded properties or compositions by changing the precursors or the process parameters. Furthermore, ILGAR is an in-line process whereas chemical bath deposition is intrinsically a batch process.
