= Muhammad Zaki Butt =

Pakistani Airforce officer

- Born: Mohammad Zakaria Butt; 26 January 1929; Lahore, British India
- Died: 7 January 1993; Islamabad, Pakistan
- Military career
- Allegiance: Pakistan
- Branch: Pakistan Air Force
- Service years: 1948 - 1979
- Rank: Air Commodore
- Unit: No. 17 Squadron
- Commands: PAF Base Peshawar PAF Base Sakesar PAF Base Lahore PAF Base Mauripur PAF Base Badin

Air Commodore Muhammad Zakaria Butt was a Pakistan Air Force fighter pilot who served in the Indo-Pakistani War of 1965 and 1971. He was born to a respected family of Lahore in 1929. He was the commander of the Students' Guard for Quaid-e-Azam Muhammad Ali Jinnah from 1946 to 1948, worked closely with Jinnah, and after his death was commissioned as a pilot officer in the Pakistan Air Force in 1948.

Muhammad Zakaria Butt was one of the finest fighter pilots and administrators in the history of PAF. He had a distinguished career, founded the Squadron 17 in 1957, commanded all major bases in Pakistan and headed the first Pakistani mission in Saudi Arabia. He served as the Air Defence Commander in 1971 war. He was also the Deputy Chief of Air Staff and Inspector General of the PAF.
