= Punjab Women Protection Authority =

The Punjab Women Protection Authority is an authority established by the Government of Punjab, Pakistan to protect the women by establishing Violence against Women Centers across Punjab, Pakistan.

== See also ==
- Aman (Islam), Islamic term for offering safety, protection, safe conduct, or pardon to enemies
