= DJ Butt =

Pakistani DJ

- آصف نظر بٹ
- Born: Asif Nazar Butt; 28 February 1987 (age 39); Lahore, Punjab, Pakistan
- Occupation: Disc jockey
- Years active: 2000–present
- Political party: Pakistan Tehreek-e-Insaf

Asif Nazar Butt (born 28 February 1987), better known by his stage name DJ Butt, is a Pakistani DJ, political activist and entrepreneur from Lahore, best known for his work as a disc jockey during the political rallies of Pakistan Tehreek-e-Insaf. He is also the owner of a café named DJ Butt Café in Model Town, Lahore.

== Early life and career ==
Butt was born on 28 February 1987 in Lahore, Pakistan. He used to work as a helper at a coffee shop in 1996 where many people encouraged him to become a disc jockey (DJ): "I used to play music at the coffee shop, which a lot of my customers and shopkeepers around liked. They encouraged me to become a DJ. Then there was a wedding where I was asked to play. I just took my entire collection from the shop, rented a music system, and played there. In no time, I had DJed at around 20 weddings," said DJ Butt.

Butt then managed many events including 2007 Sprite 3g launch and Gloria Jean's launch. He was introduced to the PTI in 2011 by his friend Captain Hassan Bilal who was assistant of Imran Khan's brother-in-law. Butt started managing rallies of PTI in 2013. He has composed and created many anthems for PTI from which Go Nawaz Go was the most famous.

== Legal difficulties ==
Butt was arrested in September 2014 for violation of Section 144 of the Code of Criminal Procedure ("the Amplifier Act"), for a capital administration ban on the use of loudspeakers during a PTI sit-in, in connection with a case registered under Section 188 of the Pakistan Penal Code, entitled ‘Disobedience to Order, Duly Promulgated by Public Servant’. PTI spokesperson Chaudhry Rizwan said that he had been arrested by 10 people wearing police uniforms 7 am on 12 September 2014.

== Other issues ==
In April 2015 while working in his café in Lahore, Butt was attacked by eight men armed with weapons. Butt told that the attackers dragged him out of the café and were trying to bundle him into a vehicle when nearby traders came to his rescue.

On 6 June 2015, Butt sued PTI for not paying his dues amounting to Rs. 140 million, out of which he only received Rs. 52 million. Butt said in an interview that the party still owes him Rs. 80 million and he will go to court if his payment is withheld. He was also served a notice for the recovery of Rs. 17 million tax on the basis of his claim against PTI.
