= Rasheed Butt =

Pakistani calligrapher

Rasheed Butt (born 1944) is a Pakistani calligrapher. Active since 1961, he has worked in a number of calligraphic styles, including reproductions of texts from the Qur'an, the hadith, traditional invocations and prayers and poetry.

Butt belongs to a Kashmiri family.
