= Mustafa Pasha =

Mustafa Pasha may refer to:

== People ==
Chronologically (by birth year where known):

- Çoban Mustafa Pasha (died 1529), Ottoman vizier and governor of Egypt (1522–23)
- Koca Mustafa Pasha (fl. 1511–1512), Ottoman grand vizier (1511–12)
- Kara Şahin Mustafa Pasha (fl. 1524–1566), Ottoman governor of Egypt (1560–63) and founder of the Ridwan dynasty
- Mustafa Pasha, governor-general of Lahsa in 1559, see Lahsa Eyalet
- Lala Kara Mustafa Pasha (died 1580), Ottoman general and grand vizier (1580)
- Manuchar II Jaqeli (died 1614), known as Mustafa Pasha during his tenure under the Ottomans
- Mustafa Pasha, governor of Damascus in 1623, see Mount Lebanon Emirate
- Kara Mustafa Pasha (governor of Egypt) (died 1627), Ottoman governor of Egypt (1623, 1624–26)
- Kemankeş Mustafa Pasha (1592–1644), Ottoman grand vizier (1638–44)
- Lefkeli Mustafa Pasha (died 1648), Ottoman grand vizier (1622) and governor of Egypt (1618)
- Kara Mustafa Pasha (c. 1630–1683), Ottoman grand vizier (1676–83)
- Bozoklu Mustafa Pasha (died 1698), Ottoman grand vizier (1693–94)
- Mustafa Pasha (fl. 1748), Ottoman governor of Rhodes, see Manuel Pinto da Fonseca
- Mustafa Pasha Kara Mehmed-zade (fl. July 1755), Ottoman governor of Skopje
- Köse Bahir Mustafa Pasha (died 1765), Grand Vizier of the Ottoman Empire and governor of Egypt
- Hadži Mustafa Pasha (1733—1801)
- Mustafa Pasha (Egypt) (fl. 1800), Ottoman commander defeated by Napoleon Bonaparte in 1799
- Mustafa Naili Pasha (1798–1871), Ottoman grand vizier (1853–54, 1857)
- Mustafa Reşid Pasha (1800–1858), Ottoman statesman, diplomat, reformer, and grand vizier (1846–58) during Tanzimat
- Mustafa Pasha (naval officer) (1804–1877), British naval officer Adolphus Slade, known as Mustafa Pasha in Ottoman service
- Mustafa Celalettin Pasha (1826–1876), participant in Polish and Ottoman uprisings, strategist, and writer
- Mustafa Fazl Pasha (1830–1875), Egyptian prince, grandson of Muhammad Ali Pasha
- Mustafa Zihni Pasha (1838–1911), Ottoman official and founding member of the nationalist Kürt Teali Cemiyeti society
- Mustafa Fahmi Pasha (1840–1914), former Prime Minister of Egypt
- Mustafa Hilmi Pasha (1840–1922), general of the Ottoman Army
- Mustafa Yamulki (1866–1936), Ottoman general and Minister of Education of the Kingdom of Kurdistan (previously Nemrud Mustafa Pasha)
- Mustafa Kamil Pasha (1874–1908), Egyptian nationalist, lawyer, and journalist
- Mustafa Fevzi Çakmak (1876–1950), Turkish field marshal and politician
- Mustafa el-Nahhas Pasha (1879–1965), former Prime Minister of Egypt
- Mustafa Kemal Atatürk (1881–1938), founder of the Republic of Turkey

== Other ==
- Koca Mustafa Pasha Mosque, a former Byzantine church converted into a mosque by the Ottomans, located in Istanbul, Turkey
- Atik Mustafa Pasha Mosque, a former Byzantine church converted into a mosque by the Ottomans, located in Istanbul Turkey
- Mustafa Pasha Mosque, an Ottoman-era mosque located in the Old Bazaar of Skopje, Macedonia
- Mustafa Pasha Bridge, a bridge located in Svilengrad, Bulgaria

== See also ==
- Jisri Mustafa Pasha (Cisri Mustafa Paşa), former name of Svilengrad, Bulgaria
