= Mustafa Pasha Kara Mehmed-zade =

Ottoman governor of Skopje from 1755

Mustafa Pasha Kara Mehmed-zade (fl. 1740–1755) was the Ottoman vali (governor) of Üsküb (Skopje), beginning in July 1755. He was a vizier (provincial governor), and a former kapudan (navy admiral).

== Career ==
=== Sanjak of Smederevo ===
From July to November 1740, he served as the muhafiz ("guardian") of Belgrade (Sanjak of Smederevo), succeeding Ali Pasha Abdi-zade who was the first muhafiz after the Austrian-Ottoman peace (1739–40).

=== Sanjak of Üsküp ===
He was the vali (governor) of Üsküp (Skopje), beginning in July 1755.

== Annotations ==
- Name: (Serbian: Мустафа-паша Кара Мехмедзаде/Mustafa-paša Kara Mehmedzade [or] Елчи Мустафа-паша Кара Мехмедпашазаде/Elči Mustafa-paša Mehmedpašazade)
