= Eric Bhat =

French journalist (1956–2025)

- Born: 22 November 1956; Pau, France
- Died: 8 June 2025 (aged 68)
- Education: Institut de journalisme Bordeaux Aquitaine
- Occupation: Journalist

Eric Bhat (22 November 1956 – 8 June 2025) was a French journalist who specialised in automobile racing.

After his studies at the Institut de journalisme Bordeaux Aquitaine, he began his career with Auto Hebdo. He was also founder and editor-in-chief of the magazine Auto Plus. After a trip to India in the 1990s, he discovered ayurveda, promoting its use in France. In 2022, TF1 devoted a piece to his work on ayurveda on its 13:00 news program.

Bhat died on 8 June 2025, at the age of 68.

== Publications ==
- Rondeau, victoire au Mans (1980)
- Le Programme politique d'un mec nommé Coluche (1981)
- L’année Liberté (1989)
