= Rovshan Mustafayev =

Azerbaijani political scientist

- Rövşən Mustafayev
- Born: 5 October 1960; Baku, Azerbaijani SSR, USSR
- Died: 20 February 2009 (aged 48); Istanbul, Turkey
- Spouse: Aytan Mustafayeva

Rovshan Mustafayev (5 October 1960 – 20 February 2009) was an Azerbaijani political scientist.

Mustafayev established the first independent center for analytics in Azerbaijan in 1993. He published the scientific and political papers Dirçeliş XXI asır (Russian: Vozrajdenie-XXI vek). He also found and served as the head of the Human Rights Institute under the Azerbaijan National Sciences Academy. Having published more than 70 scientific articles and books, he represented Azerbaijan in many international conferences.

Mustafayev’s most well known works are concerning the March Days.

Following a long illness, Mustafayev died at the age of 48 in Memorial Hospital, Turkey.
