= AcademiaNet =

Database of women scientists

AcademiaNet was an international database containing profiles of women scientists. It is a non-profit project with the goal to raise the share of women in leadership positions in academia. AcademiaNet was initiated in 2010 in Germany by the Robert Bosch Stiftung and the publishing house "Spektrum der Wissenschaft". The Swiss National Science Foundation assumed responsibility of the platform in 2020, but shut it down in September 2025.

== Goals and functions ==
The share of women professors and executives at research institutions across Europe is low and rising only slowly. AcademiaNet is a resource aimed at facilitating the search for women researchers in view of academic appointments or as conference speakers, experts on scientific committees or peer reviewers. A search function allows users to find the registered scientists according to their field or discipline. As opposed to databases such as "Request a Woman in STEMM" by 500 Women Scientists or "WiLS database of women in science", women cannot create their own profile on AcademiaNet; they need to be nominated by a scientific partner based on clearly defined criteria.

== History ==
The Robert Bosch Stiftung founded AcademiaNet in 2010. In her speech inaugurating the platform in November 2010, the German Chancellor and physicist Angela Merkel said that science would not achieve its full potential if it remained predominantly male and did not promote half of its talents. She also said that AcademiaNet offered more visibility to women scientists, who contribute with their expertise to scientific endeavours.

Initially, the platform was in German and contained primarily researchers from Germany, who were nominated by institutions such as the Leibniz Association, the Deutsche Forschungsgemeinschaft (DFG) or the Fraunhofer Society. Since 2012, the platform has become more international. The language of the platform is now English.

In 2020, the management of AcademiaNet passed from the Robert Bosch Stiftung to the Swiss National Science Foundation, which continued to work with the publishing house "Spektrum der Wissenschaft" until September 2025.

== Renowned members ==
A number of renowned female scientists were member of AcademiaNet. Here a list of some of the most famous among them:

- May-Britt Moser, psychologist and neuroscientists, winner of the Nobel Prize in Physiology or Medicine
- Janet Rossant, developmental biologist
- Françoise Combes, astrophysicist
- Riitta Hari, neuroscientist and physician
- Caroline Dean, plant scientist
- Ottoline Leyser, plant biologist

== Partner organisations ==
AcademiaNet is a non-profit project. It was funded by the Swiss National Science Foundation, the Robert Bosch Stiftung and 21 European research funding organisations, including the Max Planck Society for the Advancement of Science, the Royal Society, the Spanish National Research Council, the Swedish Research Council and the European Molecular Biology Organization. AcademiaNet is also included in the search map of The Brussels Binder, a database for more women in European debates.

More than 40 European science organisations nominate women scientists who meet the selection criteria of AcademiaNet. These organisations include:

- Academy of Finland, Finland
- French National Centre for Scientific Research, France
- Foundation for Polish Science, Poland
- National Fund for Scientific Research, Belgium
- Austrian Science Fund, Austria
- Fraunhofer Society, Germany
- Royal Society of Edinburgh, Scotland
- Danish Council for Independent Research, Denmark
- Wellcome Trust, United Kingdom
- Estonian Research Council, Estonia
