= Mustafa Erdik =

Turkish academic and engineer (born 1948)

- Born: 1948 (age 77–78); Ankara, Turkey
- Education: Middle East Technical University; Rice University
- Scientific career
- Fields: Earthquake engineering
- Workplaces: Middle East Technical University; Boğaziçi University

Mustafa Erdik (born 1948) is a Turkish professor emeritus, an expert in earthquake engineering. He is a former faculty member of the Middle East Technical University and Boğaziçi University. He is the president of the Turkish Earthquake Foundation, and his studies are concerned with strong-motion characterization, earthquake hazard and risk assessment.

== Early life and education ==
Erdik was born in Ankara in 1948. He graduated from the Middle East Technical University having a degree in civil engineering in 1970. He received his Master of Science from Rice University. He also obtained his Ph.D. from the same university in 1975.

== Career ==
Following his graduation Erdik started his academic career at the Middle East Technical University where he served as the director of the Earthquake Engineering Research Center from 1980 to 1987. In 1988 he began to work at Boğaziçi University and established the Department of Earthquake Engineering in 1989. He also worked as the director of the Kandilli Observatory and Earthquake Research Institute. In addition, Erdik served as the director of the Turkish Earthquake Engineering Research Committee. His current post is the president of the Turkish Earthquake Foundation.

Erdik was the editor-in-chief of the Soil Dynamics and Earthquake Engineering journal.

=== Work and activities ===
Erdik has published numerous articles and reports and edited various books on earthquake preparedness and other related topics.

He has involved in many significant activities some of which include the Istanbul Earthquake Rapid Response and Early Warning System and the structural health monitoring arrays in World Heritage Site of the UNESCO such as Hagia Sophia and Süleymaniye Mosque.

=== Awards ===
Erdik has been the recipient of various awards, including the United Nations's Sasakawa Disaster Prevention Award, NATO’s Science for Peace – Summit Prize, Bruce Bolt Medal by Earthquake Engineering Research Institute (February 2013), Prof. Nicholas Ambraseys Distinguished Lecture Award by the European Association for Earthquake Engineering and Science Award by Scientific and Technological Research Council of Turkey (2018).

== Personal life ==
Erdik's wife, Hilal Erdik, is a construction engineer. They have a son.
