= S. L. Bhat =

Indian politician

S. L. Bhat was the Chairman of the Jammu & Kashmir Public Service Commission; he succeeded Arun Kumar in 2009. He was previously Financial Commissioner, Planning & Development Department. He was succeeded by Abdul Latief Deva as chairman in 2015.

== Biography ==
Born on January, 1st 1950 at Chandapura, Harwan Srinagar Shiban Lal Bhat graduated from Sir Parshurambhau College, Pune, Maharashtra and did his master's degree in Political Science from Kashmir University. He pursued a master's degree from Jawahar Lal Nehru University, New Delhi and also a Masters in Development Management and Environment from Glasgow University, U.K.

He joined the Indian Administrative Services in 1976, and served as Deputy Commissioner of Rajouri and Baramulla Districts and also Divisional Commissioner, Kashmir. He served as Commissioner/Secretary to the Agriculture Production, Labor and Employment and Science and Technology Departments. He has been Principal Secretary to the Social Welfare and General Administration Department. He has the distinction of serving in the Ministry of Home Affairs as Director and Joint Secretary from 1991 to 1996. He also served in the Ministry of Agriculture and Cooperation from 2005 to 2008, becoming Additional Secretary for Agriculture and Cooperation in the Agriculture Ministry in 2007. He has represented the country in many international conferences including the FAO and led the Union Agriculture Ministry delegation to China and Pakistan
