= Ghulam Mustafa Bhat =

Ghulam Mustafa Bhat (Urdu: غلام مصطفیٰ بٹ) was the senior leader of Jammu & Kashmir National Conference and Mayor of Srinagar Municipal Corporation, the summer capital of the Indian territory of Jammu and Kashmir. At the age of 47, he died at Sher-i-Kashmir Institute of Medical Sciences in 2011. He remained Mayor of SMC for two years and was appointed as the deputy Advocate General by the state Government of Jammu and Kashmir.
