= Ilgar Mammadov =

Azerbaijani politician

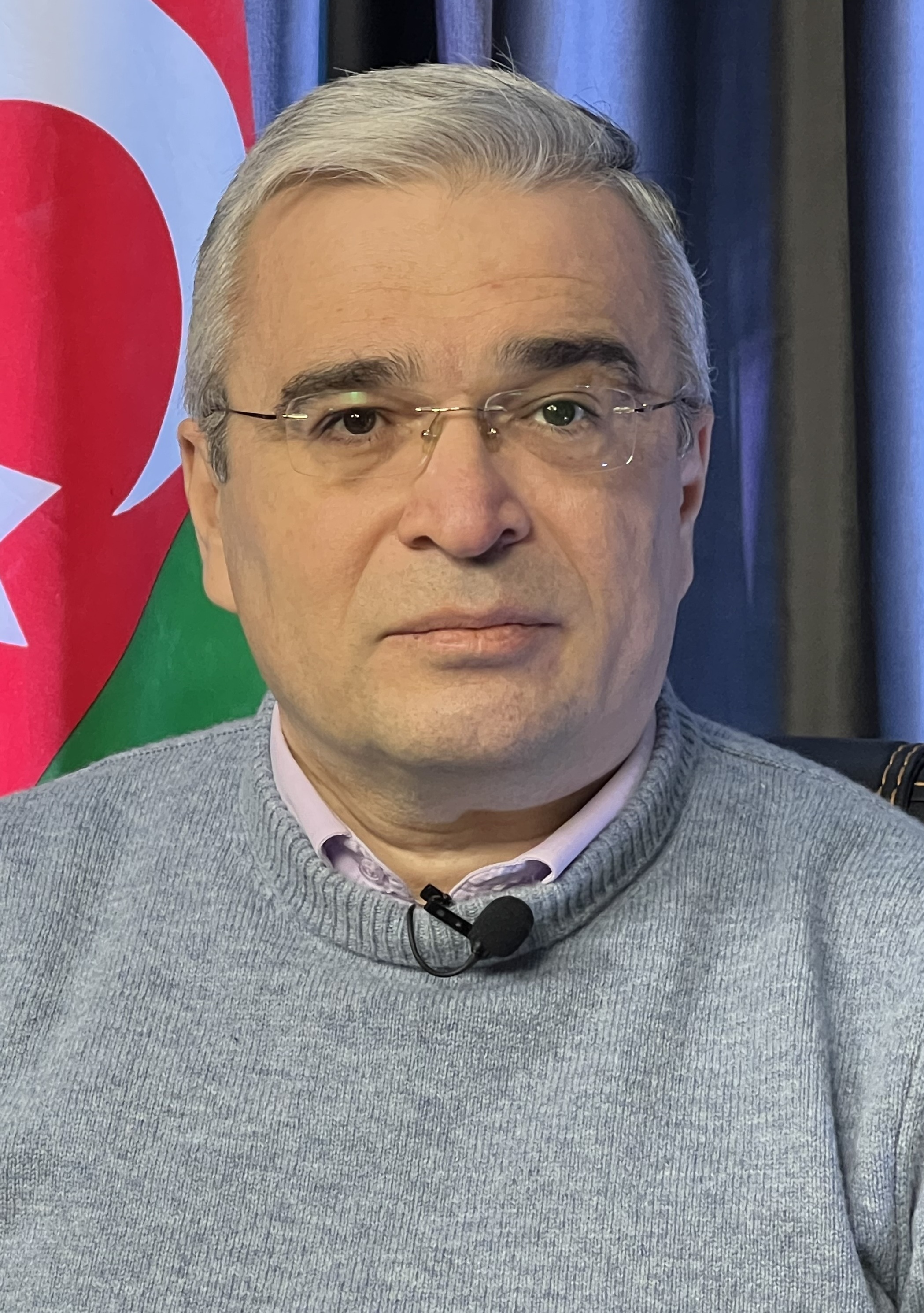
- Mammadov in 2019.

Co-chairman of REAL Party
- In office 25 December 2008 – 11 September 2024

Personal details
- Born: 14 June 1970 (age 56) Baku, Azerbaijan SSR, Soviet Union
- Party: REAL Party (2017–present)
- Other political affiliations: Azerbaijan National Independence Party (1998–2003)
- Education: Lomonosov Moscow State University, Central European University
- Occupation: Politician, blogger

Ilgar Mammadov (Azerbaijani: İlqar Məmmədov; born 14 June 1970) is an opposition politician in Azerbaijan, and one of the leaders of the Republican Alternative Party. Mammadov was considered a likely candidate for the Presidential elections in October 2013, but was arrested in February 2013, prior to the race, in a move that was widely seen as politically motivated.

In March 2014, Mammadov was sentenced to 7 years in jail. He was released from prison on 13 August 2018. On 23 April 2020, the Supreme Court of Azerbaijan has acquitted Ilgar Mammadov and 300,000 manat compensation will be paid.

== Life ==
He was born in 1970. After serving in the Soviet Army from 1988 to 1989, he studied history at Moscow State University and political science at Central European University in Budapest. In 1994-2000 he was a researcher at Baku State University. He was one of the founders of the National Committee for European Integration and the first chairman of the Committee. He is director of the Council of Europe's School of Political Studies in Azerbaijan. He is also a member of the advisory boards of the Black Sea Trust for Regional Cooperation and Revenue Watch Institute. Since 2006, Ilgar Mammadov has been a member of the Board of the Open Society Institute of Azerbaijan.

=== Political career ===
Mammadov's previous political affiliation was with the National Independence Party where he served as Deputy Chairman between 1998 and 2003. He left the party in 2003 due to growing policy disagreements.

Mammadov was banned from TV and radio after his 19 March 2009 republicanist speech on ANS TV live. He had protested against the conduct of the 18 March 2009 referendum that removed term limits from the President's office, and thus permitted, in principle, a President for life.

== Arrest and imprisonment ==
Mammadov was arrested on 4 February 2013, after traveling to Ismayilli, a town in Northern Azerbaijan in which there had been civil disturbance, following alleged repression by the local governor. He subsequently was sentenced to seven years imprisonment, in March 2014.

A number of countries and organizations have protested against this sentencing. The US State Department noted "significant irregularities in witness testimony and court proceedings. Our observations led to the conclusion that the verdicts were not based on the evidence and were politically motivated." The Foreign Office of the United Kingdom also expressed concern, saying that they were "troubled by a number of aspects of the conduct of the trial which reinforce the impression that the verdicts were politically motivated." Similar statements were released by France, the European Union and the Parliamentary Assembly of the Council of Europe. The Natural Resource Governance Institute, a think tanks, also condemned the sentence.

On 22 May 2014 the European Court of Human Rights (ECHR) found that the authorities in Azerbaijan had violated a number of basic human rights provisions in arresting and sentencing Mammadov. The court ordered Azerbaijan to pay compensation to Mammadov. On 5 December 2017 the Committee of Ministers of the Council of Europe, for the first time in its history, initiated infringement proceedings against the Republic of Azerbaijan for failing to comply with the ECHR judgment. On 1 April 2019 the ECHR unanimously held that there had been a violation of Article 46 § 1 of the European Convention on Human Rights, as the Republic of Azerbaijan had failed to fulfil its obligation to comply with the judgment.
