= Ghulam Mustafa Khan (statistician) =

Pakistani cricket administrator and statistician

Ghulam Mustafa Khan was a Pakistani cricket administrator and statistician who was Wisden's Pakistan correspondent from 1959 to 1983. He was also a contributor to The Cricketer magazine.

Born on 17 January 1932 in Multan, Pakistan, he was a graduate of the University of Karachi.

Khan also served as Secretary of the Pakistan Cricket Board in the mid-1990s. He died in Lahore in January 2016 following a brief illness.
