= Republican Alternative Party (Azerbaijan) =

Azerbaijani political party

Republican Alternative Party Respublikaçı Alternativ Partiyası
- Abbreviation: ReAl; REAL
- Leader: Natiq Jafarli
- Founder: Ilgar Mammadov
- Founded: January 2009 (movement); 7 April 2018 (party)
- Registered: 1 September 2020
- Headquarters: İ.Qutqaşınlı 97, Baku
- Membership (2023): ▼5401
- Ideology: National liberalism Secularism; Republicanism; Pro-Europeanism
- Political position: Centre to centre-right
- Colours: Red and White
- Slogan: Cümhuriyyətçilər heç zaman təslim olmurlar! ('Republicans never give up!')
- Parliament: 1 / 125
- PACE: 1 / 648

Website
- realplatforma.org

The Republican Alternative Party (Azerbaijani: Respublikaçı Alternativ Partiyası, ReAl or REAL) is a movement and political party in Azerbaijan that was established in January 2009 and officially registered on 1 September 2020.

== History ==
According to the constitution, which was amended in a referendum in 2009, "one person being able to be elected president more than twice" set REAL in motion. REAL saw this as damage and betrayal of the foundations of the republic. The REAL Movement was founded on Facebook in 2009.

Ilgar Mammadov, who wanted to run in the 2013 presidential election, attended rallies in Ismayilli. Ilgar Mammadov was sentenced to seven years in prison for violating public order.

== Congresses ==
=== First Constituent Assembly ===
The first attempt to hold the founding congress was made on 29 October 2017. Information on this was announced on 24 January 2014. However, the Baku City Executive Power rejected REAL's request to allocate a place for the congress.

The Constituent Assembly Initiative Group again appealed to the authorities to provide a venue for the convention on 4, 5, 11, 12, 18, 19, 25 and 26 November or the first week of December. However, the executive power also rejected this appeal.

== Election results ==
=== National Assembly elections ===
Election	Leader	Votes	%	Seats	+/–	Position	Government
2024	Ilgar Mammadov	17,993	0.76	1 / 125	New	▲4th	Opposition
