= Nesuh Bey =

Himmeti Zade Nesuh-beg, or simply Nesuh Bey (Bosnian: Nesuh-beg) is the name given by historian Muvekit for the founder of one of the first mosques in the territory of Bosnia and Herzegovina, built in Vrhbosna (part of modern Sarajevo) in 1452 near the Latin bridge.

Nesuh-beg has been incorrectly attributed as the second sanjak-bey of Bosnia, in fact no individual named Nesuh-beg was a governor in Bosnia; the first sanjak-bey of Bosnia was Mehmed-beg Minetović (1463 — 1464), who was the real founder of the mosque. The mosque does not exist today.
