= Mrs. Mike (film) =

1949 film by Louis King

- Theatrical release poster
- Directed by: Louis King
- Screenplay by: DeWitt Bodeen; Alfred Lewis Levitt
- Based on: Mrs. Mike by Benedict Freedman; Nancy Freedman
- Produced by: Edward Gross
- Starring: Dick Powell; Evelyn Keyes; J. M. Kerrigan; Angela Clarke; Will Wright; Nan Boardman
- Cinematography: Joseph F. Biroc
- Edited by: Paul Weatherwax
- Music by: William Lava; Max Steiner
- Production companies: Nassour Studios Inc. Huntington Hartford Productions; Regal Films
- Distributed by: United Artists
- Release date: December 23, 1949
- Running time: 99 minutes
- Country: United States
- Language: English
- Box office: $1,550,000

Mrs. Mike is a 1949 American drama film directed by Louis King and written by DeWitt Bodeen and Alfred Lewis Levitt. The film stars Dick Powell, Evelyn Keyes, J. M. Kerrigan, Angela Clarke, Will Wright and Nan Boardman. The film was released on December 23, 1949, by United Artists.

== Plot ==
A young Boston woman, Kathy O'Fallon, travels north to visit her Uncle John at his cabin near the Canada–US border. While there she meets Mike Flannigan, a sergeant with the Canadian Royal North-West Mounted Police, and before long they are in love. Kathy marries Mike, who takes her by dogsled to his outpost in the cold, remote north.

Life is harsh there, particularly during the winters. A tightly knit community counts on Mike in ways that go far beyond normal police business. But he is away when a pregnant Kathy begins to worry about giving birth in such a primitive environment. Neighbors help deliver Mary, a baby girl, but surviving in the wilderness is extremely difficult, and the child dies during a diphtheria epidemic. Kathy makes up her mind to return to Boston, but realizes that she still loves and can't leave Mike.

== Cast ==
- Dick Powell as Sgt. Mike Flannigan
- Evelyn Keyes as Kathy O'Fallon Flannigan
- J. M. Kerrigan as Uncle John
- Angela Clarke as Sarah Carpentier
- Will Wright as Dr. McIntosh
- Nan Boardman as Georgette Beauclaire
- Clarence Straight as Cameron
- Frances Morris as Mrs. Howard
- John Miljan as Mr. Howard
- Joel Nestler as Pierre Carpentier
- Jean Inness as Mrs. Mathers
- Chief Yowlachie as Atenou
- Fred Aldrich as Louis Beauclaire
- Gary Lee Jackson as Tommy Henderson
- Romere Darling as Mrs. Henderson
- Archie Leonard as Trader Jim Henderson
- James Fairfax as Danny Hawkins
- Robin Camp as Tommy Howard
- Don Pietro as Joe Howard
- Janet Sackett as Madeleine Beauclaire
- Judith Sackett as Barbette Beauclaire

== Comic book adaption ==
- Eastern Color Movie Love #1 (February 1950)
