= Benedict and Nancy Freedman House =

Notable residence in California

General information
- Client: Benedict and Nancy Freedman

Design and construction
- Architect(s): Richard Neutra

The Benedict and Nancy Freedman House was a house at 315 North Via De La Paz in Pacific Palisades, Los Angeles. It was completed in 1949 to the designs of architect Richard Neutra and was destroyed in the January 2025 Palisades Fire. It was designed for the screenwriters Benedict and Nancy Freedman.

The house was made from wood and featured large glass windows with clerestories. It was divided by a large patio space with a bedroom on the west side. The house had a swimming pool, separated from the house by pergolas made from redwood. It was subsequently expanded with a second floor and remodelled by architecture firm nonzero\architecture (formerly studio bau:ton) in 2017.
