= Neutra Office Building =

- U.S. National Register of Historic Places
- Los Angeles Historic-Cultural Monument
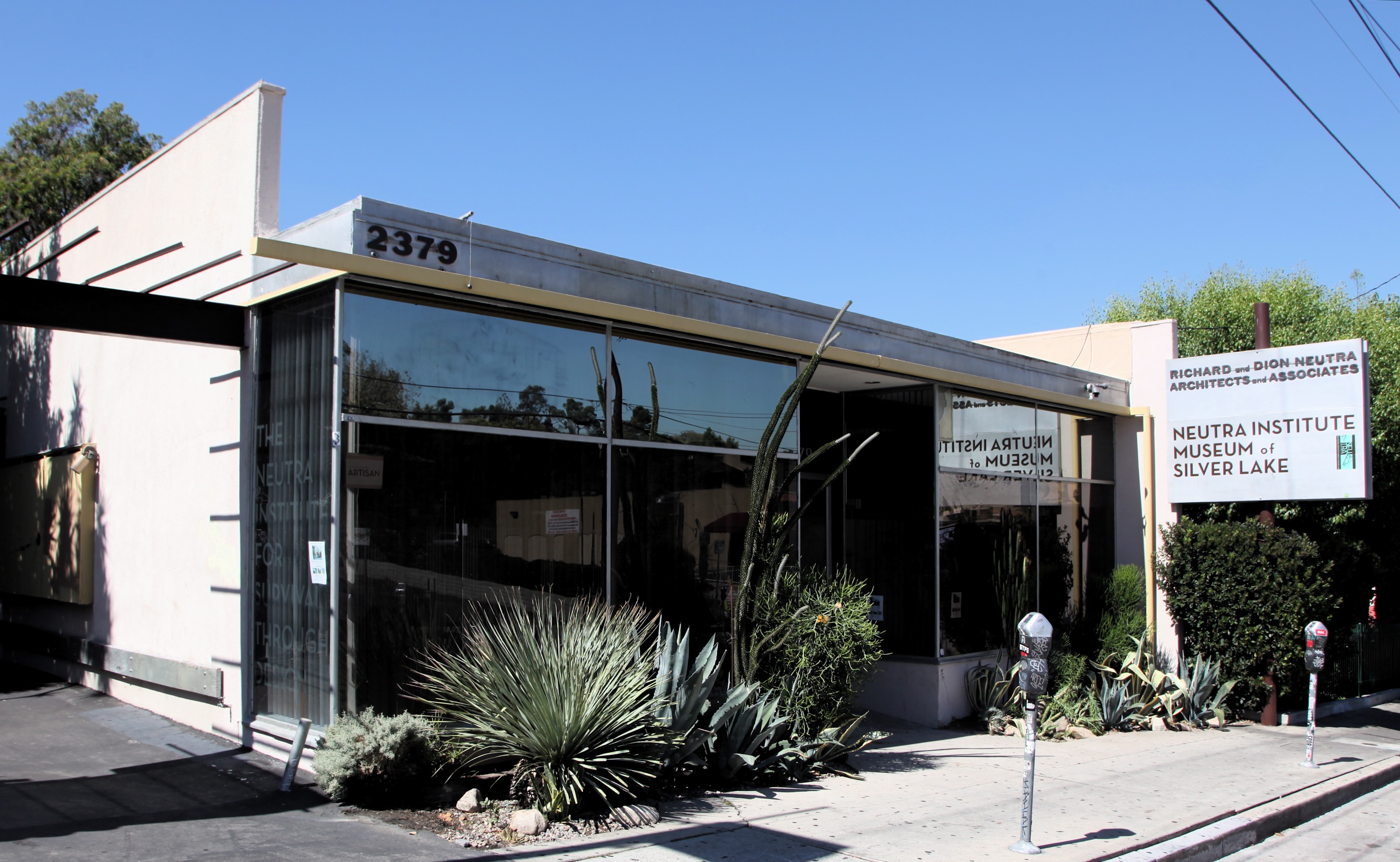
- Neutra Office Building, 2014

- Location within the Los Angeles metropolitan area Location within California Location within the United States
- Location: 2379 Glendale Boulevard, Silver Lake, Los Angeles, California
- Coordinates: 34.099605°N 118.259389°W
- Built: 1950
- Architect: Neutra, Richard Joseph; Marsh, Fordyce
- Architectural style: International Style
- NRHP reference No.: 01000075
- LAHCM No.: 676

Significant dates
- Added to NRHP: March 8, 2004
- Designated LAHCM: April 25, 2000

The Neutra Office Building is a 4,800-square-foot (450 m^{2}) office building in the Silver Lake section of Los Angeles, California. The building was owned and designed by Modernist architect Richard Neutra in 1950. It served as the studio and office for Neutra's architecture practice from 1950 until Neutra's death in 1970. The building has been declared a Historic Cultural Monument and listed on the National Register of Historic Places. It was listed for sale in 2007 at an asking price of $3,500,000.

== Richard Neutra ==
Architect Richard Neutra (1892-1970), a native of Vienna, Austria, moved to Los Angeles in 1925 to work with Rudolph Schindler on Frank Lloyd Wright's Barnsdall Park project. In 1929, Neutra became famous in his own right with the completion of his landmark Modernist Lovell House in the Los Feliz section of Los Angeles. Over the next 20 years, Neutra became one of the recognized innovators and leaders of Modernist architecture.

== Construction and architecture of the Neutra Office Building ==
Neutra built the Silver Lake office building in 1950 to house his own architectural practice. Neutra designed the building with his son, Dion Neutra, acting as project architect and Red Marsh as the contractor. The one-story office building includes two reception areas, two conference rooms, and a large open office space. The building also includes two residential units with an enclosed garden at the rear of the building. The building has been carefully preserved by Neutra's son, Dion. Many original built-ins and design details remain intact, including custom strip lighting, acoustic tiles, exposed ducting, operable louvers, and blue Aklo glass.

== Operation as Neutra's design studio ==
The building has been called "a piece of L.A. history since many of (Neutra's) L.A. buildings were probably dreamed up in this very office." It was in this building that Neutra designed many of his landmark buildings, including the U.S. Embassy in Karachi, Pakistan, the Los Angeles Hall of Records, the Gettysburg Cyclorama Building, the Orange County Courthouse, and the Huntington Beach Public Library. The building remained the site of the Neutra architectural practice even after Neutra's death in 1970; Dion Neutra continued the practice at the site until the 1990s.

== Historic designation ==
Known mostly for his residential designs, the Neutra Office Building in Silver Lake is Neutra's only surviving commercial structure with Neutra's original design. The Neutra web site describes the building as "the only surviving example of Neutra commercial design that is still intact." Marketing materials for the building call it "a pristine example of the work of one of the seminal architects of the Modernist movement" and "the only remaining example of Neutra commercial design, still with its original look." The building was designated a Historic Cultural Monument (HCM #676) by the Los Angeles Cultural Heritage Commission in 2000 and listed in the National Register of Historic Places in 2004.

== Listing of the building for sale in 2006 ==
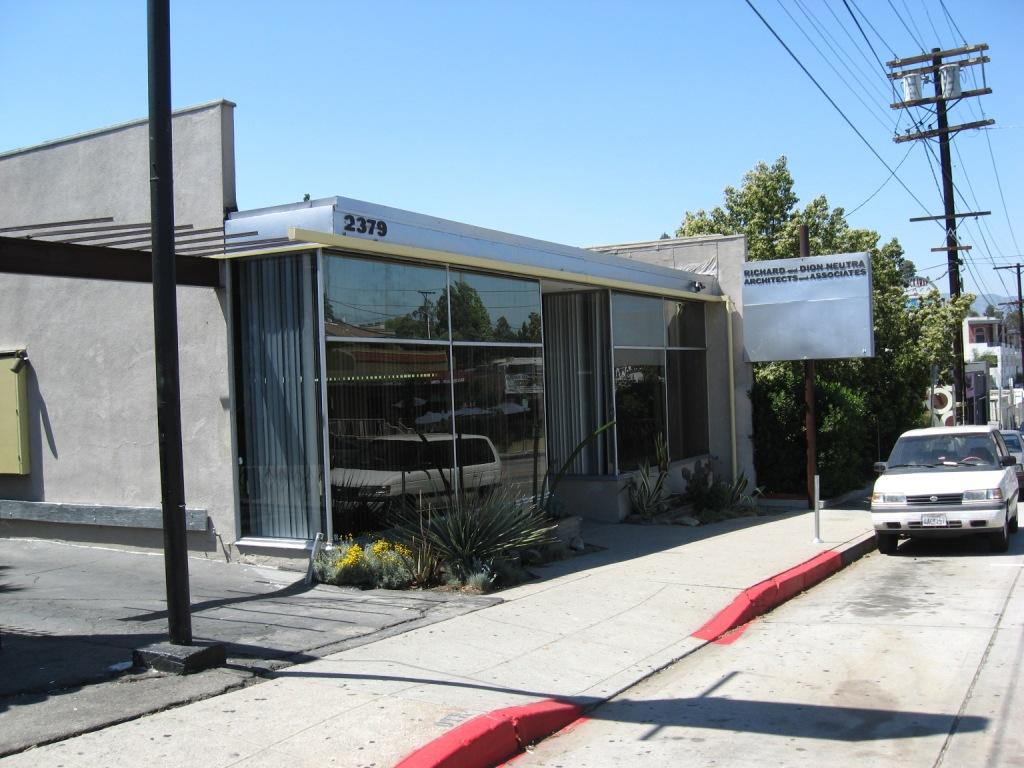
Building in 2008

After 56 years of being owned by the Neutra family, the building was listed for sale in November 2006 at an asking price of $3,500,000. The sale was conditioned on the buyer accepting a protective conservation easement, which Dion Neutra considered essential to prevent his father's work from disappearing. He told the National Trust for Historic Preservation: "I'm hoping to find a suitable steward while I'm alive that would take care of the building into the foreseeable future." The marketing brochure compared the building to works of art by Gustav Klimt and Jackson Pollock and went so far as to say: "The purchase of this icon would be equivalent to acquiring the last remaining Leonardo da Vinci masterpiece." One critic wrote of Dion's "delusional price comparison of his father's office building to the paintings of Klimt & Pollack."

== See also ==
- List of Registered Historic Places in Los Angeles
- Richard Neutra
- Neutra VDL Studio and Residences operated by the California State Polytechnic University, Pomona (Cal Poly Pomona)
