= Ebelin Bucerius House =

Coordinates: 46°11′25.4″N 08°49′20.2″E

The Ebelin Bucerius House is a private Modernist style villa residence in Brione sopra Minusio, above Lake Maggiore in the Ticino canton of Switzerland.

It was designed by the renowned Austrian-American Modernist architect Richard Neutra, and built from 1962 to 1966. The house was one of four in Switzerland that Neutra designed in the last decade of his life.

== History ==
The house was built for Gerd Bucerius, one of the founders of the German newspaper Die Zeit.

The Bucerius House cost 4 million Swiss francs to build, its high cost was partially attributable to its location atop a mountain in a forest. In correspondence during the planning of the house, Neutra acquiesced to the wishes of Bucerius's wife, Ebelin, that there be no mirrors in the bedroom.

Neutra's original plans for the house were lost in the 1964 fire that destroyed the Neutra VDL Studio and Residences, his house and design studio in Los Angeles, California.

=== Restoration ===
The Ebelin Bucerius House was renovated and restored by Villa Nova Architekten in 2005.

The house was photographed by Iwan Baan, as part of a 2010 exhibition documenting Neutra's work in Europe. Baan's photographs were published in the book Richard Neutra in Europe – Buildings and projects 1960 – 1970.

== See also ==
- Modernist architecture in Switzerland
- Richard Neutra buildings
