= R.J. Neutra Elementary School =

School district in California, United States

Coordinates: 36°15′37″N 119°53′1″W

Information
- Established: 1960; 66 years ago
- School district: Central Union School District
- NCES District ID: 0607980
- Grades: K-5
- Website: neutra.central.k12.ca.us

The R. J. Neutra Elementary School is an elementary school on the Naval Air Station Lemoore Base located in the San Joaquin Valley, in Lemoore Station, Kings County, California.

== Design ==
The school was built in 1960 from an earlier 1929 International style architectural design created by modernist architect Richard Neutra. It is a large single round "donut" structure radiating around a spacious open courtyard. The school's website describes it with: "Here one finds a "Civilian Island" of eleven acres in the midst of a military complex."

== School ==
The R. J. Neutra Elementary School, grades K-5th, is within the Central Union School District.

School administrators created and buried a time capsule in 1993 to be opened "20 Years Later" in 2013.

=== School Activities ===
R. J. Neutra offers programs such as "Gifted and Talented" and "Mileage Club" and other scholastic groups, basketball, volleyball, track and field, and other sports teams.

Neutra Elementary School has currently won 3 California Distinguished Schools Awards and 2 National Blue Ribbon Schools Awards.
