= Stratford, California =

- Unincorporated Community; Census Designated Place
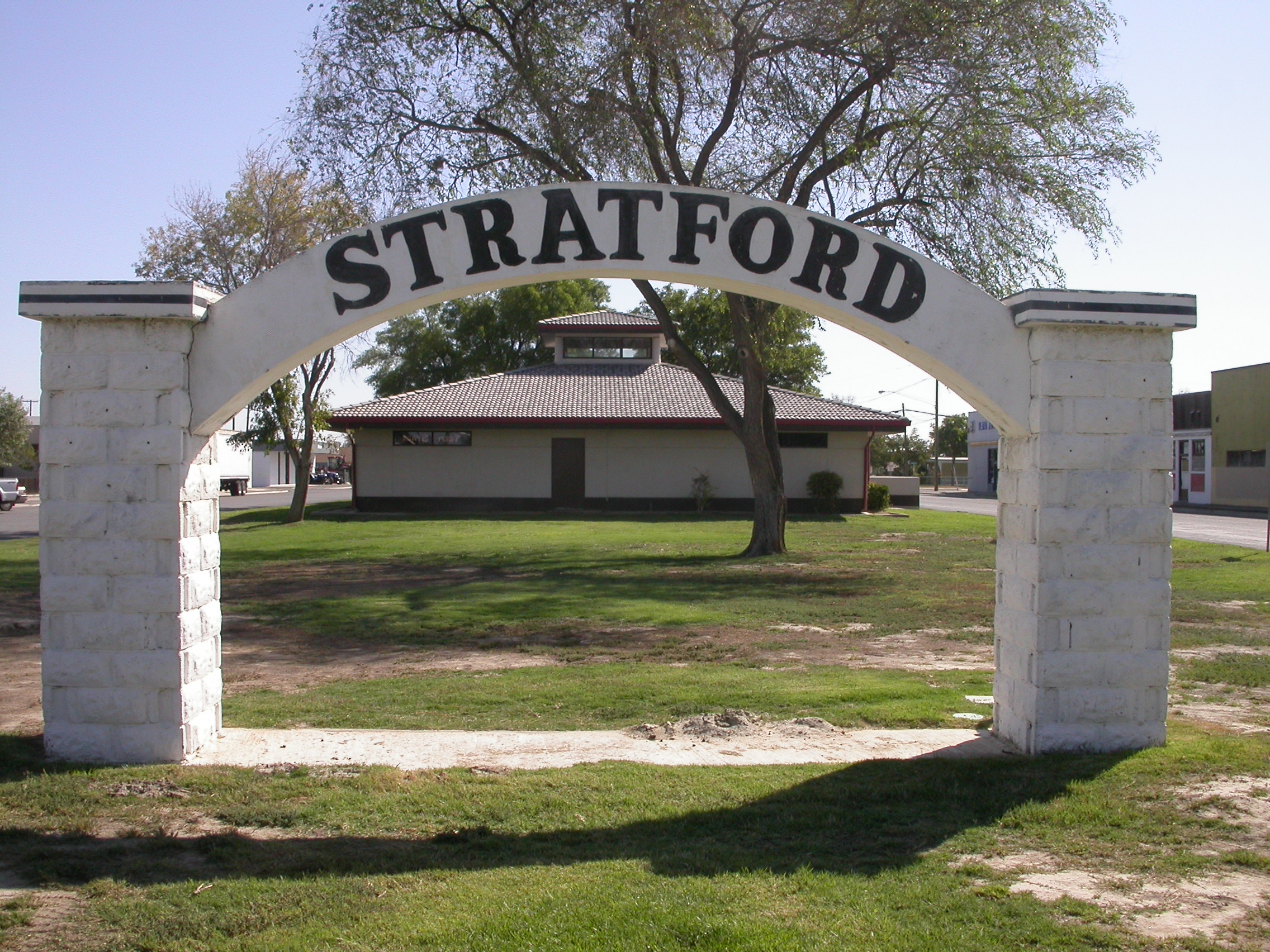
- Stratford, California

- Location in Kings County and the U.S. state of California
- Coordinates: 36°11′22″N 119°49′23″W
- Country: United States
- State: California
- County: Kings
- Founded: 1901 (as Stratton)

Area
  - Total: 0.697 sq mi (1.805 km^{2})
  - Land: 0.697 sq mi (1.805 km^{2})
  - Water: 0 sq mi (0 km^{2}) 0%
- Elevation: 203 ft (62 m)

Population (2020)
  - Total: 1,121
  - Density: 1,609/sq mi (621.1/km^{2})
- Time zone: UTC-8 (Pacific (PST))
  - Summer (DST): UTC-7 (PDT)
- ZIP code: 93266
- Area code: 559
- FIPS code: 06-75252
- GNIS feature ID: 1661510

Stratford (formerly, Stratton) is a census-designated place (CDP) in Kings County, California, United States. Stratford is located 14 miles (23 km) southwest of Hanford, at an elevation of 203 feet (62 m). It is part of the Hanford-Lemoore metropolitan area. The population was 1,121 at the 2020 census, down from 1,277 at the 2010 census.

== Geography ==
Stratford lies near the historic shoreline of Tulare Lake. The Kings River flows through an artificial channel into the normally dry Tulare Lake bed, approximately 10 miles (16 km) south of Stratford.

According to the United States Census Bureau, Stratford has a total area of 0.7 square miles (1.8 km^{2}), all land. Stratford is located at 36°11′22″N 119°49′23″W.

== History ==
The town was originally named Stratton in 1901 for William Stratton of the Empire Land and Water Company. The name was changed to Stratford in 1906 due to the efforts of the local women's club. The first post office at Stratford opened in 1910. From the 1930s through the 1970s, Stratford was the home of Irigaray's, a restaurant run by Mariana Irigaray and her daughter Alice, pioneering a Basque-inspired version of what would later be called California cuisine.

Many local residents are employed in agriculture, affected by the Great Recession and the California drought. Stratford has been affected by land subsidence.

In November 2016, the unemployment rate was estimated at 13.1%.

== Transportation ==
Kings Area Regional Transit (KART) operates regularly scheduled fixed route bus service, vanpool service for commuters and Dial-A-Ride (demand response) services throughout Kings County as well as to Fresno.

Highway 41 runs north-northeast on the west side of town, connecting it with Kettleman City on the south and Lemoore on the north.

== Education ==
Stratford Elementary School is within the Central Union School District.

== Politics ==
In the state legislature, Stratford is in the 16th senatorial district, represented by Democrat Melissa Hurtado, and in the 33rd Assembly district, represented by Republican Alexandra Macedo. Federally, Stratford is located in California's 22nd congressional district, represented by Republican David Valadao.

Stratford is represented on the Kings County Board of Supervisors by Joe Neves, a Stratford resident.

== Demographics ==
Historical population
Census	Pop.	Note	%±
2000	1,264		—
2010	1,277		1.0%
2020	1,121		−12.2%
U.S. Decennial Census; 1850–1870 1880-1890; 1900 1910 1920; 1930 1940 1950; 1960 1970 1980; 1990 2000 2010

Stratford first appeared as a census designated place in the 2000 U.S. census.

=== 2020 census ===
As of the 2020 census, Stratford had a population of 1,121. The population density was 1,608.3 inhabitants per square mile (621.0/km^{2}). The median age was 30.0 years. For every 100 females, there were 103.8 males, and for every 100 females age 18 and over, there were 102.8 males age 18 and over.

0.0% of residents lived in urban areas, while 100.0% lived in rural areas.

The census reported that 1,102 people (98.3% of the population) lived in households, 19 (1.7%) lived in non-institutionalized group quarters, and no one was institutionalized.

There were 294 households, out of which 134 (45.6%) had children under the age of 18 living in them. Of all households, 157 (53.4%) were married-couple households, 26 (8.8%) were cohabiting couple households, 46 (15.6%) had a male householder with no spouse or partner present, and 65 (22.1%) had a female householder with no spouse or partner present. 42 households (14.3%) were one person, and 16 (5.4%) were one person aged 65 or older. The average household size was 3.75. There were 237 families (80.6% of all households).

The age distribution was 338 people (30.2%) under the age of 18, 114 people (10.2%) aged 18 to 24, 307 people (27.4%) aged 25 to 44, 244 people (21.8%) aged 45 to 64, and 118 people (10.5%) who were 65 years of age or older.

There were 308 housing units at an average density of 441.9 units per square mile (170.6 units/km^{2}), of which 294 (95.5%) were occupied. Of these, 178 (60.5%) were owner-occupied, and 116 (39.5%) were occupied by renters. The vacancy rate was 4.5%; the homeowner vacancy rate was 0.6%, and the rental vacancy rate was 3.3%.

Racial composition as of the 2020 census
Race	Number	Percent
White	309	27.6%
Black or African American	6	0.5%
American Indian and Alaska Native	28	2.5%
Asian	6	0.5%
Native Hawaiian and Other Pacific Islander	0	0.0%
Some other race	549	49.0%
Two or more races	223	19.9%
Hispanic or Latino (of any race)	970	86.5%

=== Income and poverty ===
In 2023, the US Census Bureau estimated that the median household income was $61,090, and the per capita income was $19,886. About 24.7% of families and 25.8% of the population were below the poverty line.

=== 2010 census ===
The 2010 United States census reported that Stratford had a population of 1,277. The population density was 1,870.0 inhabitants per square mile (722.0/km^{2}). Hispanic or Latino of any race were 1,069 persons (83.7%). The racial makeup of Stratford was 574 (44.9%) White, 19 (1.5%) Asian, 17 (1.3%) Native American, 16 (1.3%) African American, 1 (0.1%) Pacific Islander, 617 (48.3%) from other races, and 33 (2.6%) from two or more races.

The Census reported that 1,277 people (100% of the population) lived in households. There were 312 households, of which 184 (59.0%) had children under the age of 18 living in them, 206 (66.0%) were opposite-sex married couples living together, 44 (14.1%) had a female householder with no husband present, 22 (7.1%) had a male householder with no wife present. There were 18 (5.8%) unmarried opposite-sex partnerships, and 4 (1.3%) same-sex married couples or partnerships. 31 households (9.9%) were made up of individuals, and 13 (4.2%) had someone living alone who was 65 years of age or older. The average household size was 4.09. There were 272 families (87.2% of all households); the average family size was 4.33.

433 people (33.9%) were under the age of 18, 143 people (11.2%) aged 18 to 24, 332 people (26.0%) aged 25 to 44, 277 people (21.7%) aged 45 to 64, and 92 people (7.2%) who were 65 years of age or older. The median age was 27.6 years. For every 100 females, there were 101.4 males. For every 100 females age 18 and over, there were 99.5 males.

There were 328 housing units at an average density of 480.3 per square mile (185.4/km^{2}), of which 206 (66.0%) were owner-occupied, and 106 (34.0%) were occupied by renters. The homeowner vacancy rate was 1.9%; the rental vacancy rate was 2.7%. 827 people (64.8% of the population) lived in owner-occupied housing units and 450 people (35.2%) lived in rental housing units.
