= Cyclorama Building =

Cyclorama Building may refer to:

- Cyclorama Building (Boston), built in 1884 in Boston, Massachusetts
- Atlanta Cyclorama & Civil War Museum, built in 1885 in Atlanta, Georgia
- Cyclorama Building at Gettysburg, built in 1962 and demolished in 2013 in Gettysburg, Pennsylvania
