= Albert Lewin House =

House in Santa Monica, California

Coordinates: 34°01′25″N 118°30′42″W

The Albert Lewin House at 512-514 Palisades Beach Road in Santa Monica, California was designed by the Modernist architects Richard Neutra and Peter Pfisterer for the film producer Albert Lewin and built in 1938. It was built by Frank A. Hellenthal. It is 5400 sq ft in size. Lewin was familiar with Neutra's work from his designs for the Von Sternberg House and the nearby Sten Frenke House. The house is clad in white stucco and situated on a long and narrow plot on the beach near the Santa Monica Pier. An elliptical living room is a prominent feature on the ground floor, above it is a balcony accessed from the upstairs bedrooms. The living and dining rooms are situated on the first floor.

Lewin's wife, Millie, was the interior decorator of the house at the time of its construction. Mary Stothart, the wife of composer Herbert Stothart, recalled attending parties at the house with guests including painter Max Ernst, photographer Man Ray and the film director Jean Renoir. Another guest was the poet Charles Reznikoff who quoted Lewin's letters of complaint to Neutra in his novel The Manner Music; Lewin was the model for the character of Paul Pasha in the book. Lewin had been aggrieved by the publication of photographs of the house in an architectural journal. It was illustrated in a Life magazine feature on Californian architecture in October 1945. The house was sold to the actress and writer Mae West in 1954. West renovated the house in 1957; her renovations included the painting of six nude gladiators on a curved wall that led to the six bedrooms on the first floor. West also held psychic demonstrations here with the psychic Richard Ireland. West's pet monkeys overran the house during her tenure.

The French-American architect François de Menil leased the house in the 1980s. It was subsequently owned by the architect Charles Gwathmey who added a swimming pool to the property in 1981. The house was sold in 1988. It was restored by the architect Steven Ehrlich between 1996 and 1998. It was featured in issue 56 of GA Houses. The owners of the house purchased an adjoining lot of 50 x 200 ft into which Erlich's expansion of an entertainment complex and swimming pool was built. The landscape architect Barry Beer created a minimalist garden of lawn and bamboo, with trees planted for privacy. The property was illustrated in the 2002 book Private Landscapes: Modernist Gardens in Southern California.
