= Constance Perkins House =

Coordinates: 34.1308°N 118.1794°W

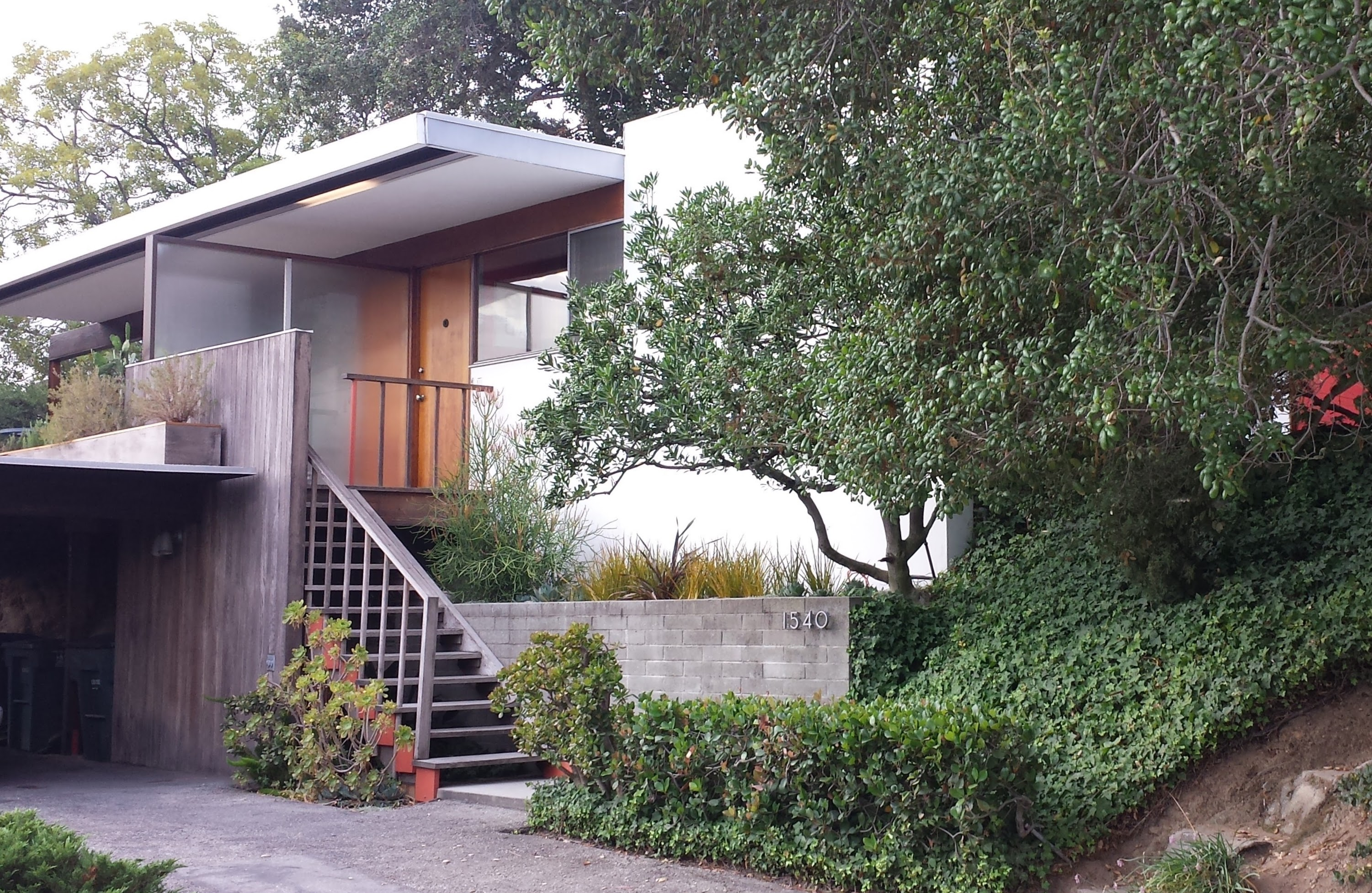
- Street view
- Interactive map of the Constance Perkins House area

General information
- Type: house
- Architectural style: Modern
- Location: Pasadena, California, United States
- Completed: 1955
- Inaugurated: 1952
- Cost: $17,166
- Client: Constance Perkins

Design and construction
- Architect: Richard Neutra

The Constance Perkins House is a house designed by Richard Neutra and built in Pasadena, California, United States, from 1952 to 1955.

== Design and construction ==
In 1947, Constance Perkins started working as a professor of Art History at Occidental College and here she met Richard Neutra, eventually asking him to design her home.

When Neutra was designing the house for her "he had to reexamine the single-family home and rework conventional patterns of the type." The house itself sits on a little hill in Pasadena, California. "The tiny house was constructed of inexpensive materials- wood, plaster, and glass; a spiderleg beam extended the space by projecting out into a small reflecting pool that meanders through one of the glass walls of the house...He also measured the physical dimensions of his clients. Constance Perkins was a small woman, so he scaled the house to her."

Neutra and Perkins worked closely together on the development of the building. In August 1953, Perkins sent Neutra a list of "Likes and Dislikes" with her autobiography so that Neutra could get a feel for what exactly she wanted for her new home.

In October 1953 Neutra had completed the preliminary drawings for her house and after approval and construction, Perkins was finally allowed to move into her new home in December 1955. The Perkins house is one of Neutra's smaller designs. It was formatted specially for Perkins and her budget. The house consists of "a free-from pool extending into the living room." Apparently Neutra and Perkins had some disagreement over what the pool should look like. She didn't want it to be of a surrealist nature but wanted, "something relaxing and more intimate." The final cost of the house came to about $17,166, which was over her original budget, nonetheless she was happy with the results.

Both Perkins and Neutra were influenced by John Entenza's Arts and Architecture Magazine. The magazine feature a lot of Neutra's work and other famous architects. "The avowed purpose [of the magazine] was to present good, contemporary design to the magazine’s largely lay audience and nudge its professional and architectural student subscribers into a truer path. The results were remarkable and A&A’s readers, who held architecture and art close to their hearts, would curl up with a cup of coffee for an hour or so to read the latest issue of the magazine." Perkins saw a great deal of Neutra's designs from this magazine and no doubt inspired her even further to have him design her own home.

Perkins' home is influential in modern architecture because of its design and the type of family that would occupy such a space. Perkins herself was a single working woman who had chosen a career over a family. She has requested no main bedroom, but would prefer sleeping in her workspace. She wanted a space "as a domestic environment in which individual creativity and work, rather than family and leisure activities were the central concept."

== Constance Perkins ==
Constance Perkins was born in Denver in 1913. Her father was a doctor and her mother was an invalid. She studied art and got her BA at the University of Denver. In 1937 she attained her master's degree in Art History at Mills College in Oakland.

Perkins died in March 1991 and left the house to the Huntington Library and Art Gallery in which she volunteered the last years of her life. The house is now privately owned.

== Quotes ==
Constance Perkins's critique on Richard Neutra's book Survival Through Design:

- "The greatest enjoyment derived from re-readings of Survival Through Design may be gained from the unique and penetrating manner in which the author has related the numerous philosophies of eighteenth-century rationalism through twentieth-century concepts of a space-time experience, to problems of contemporary design."
