= Rice House (Richmond, Virginia) =

Historic house in Virginia, United States

- U.S. National Register of Historic Places
- Virginia Landmarks Register
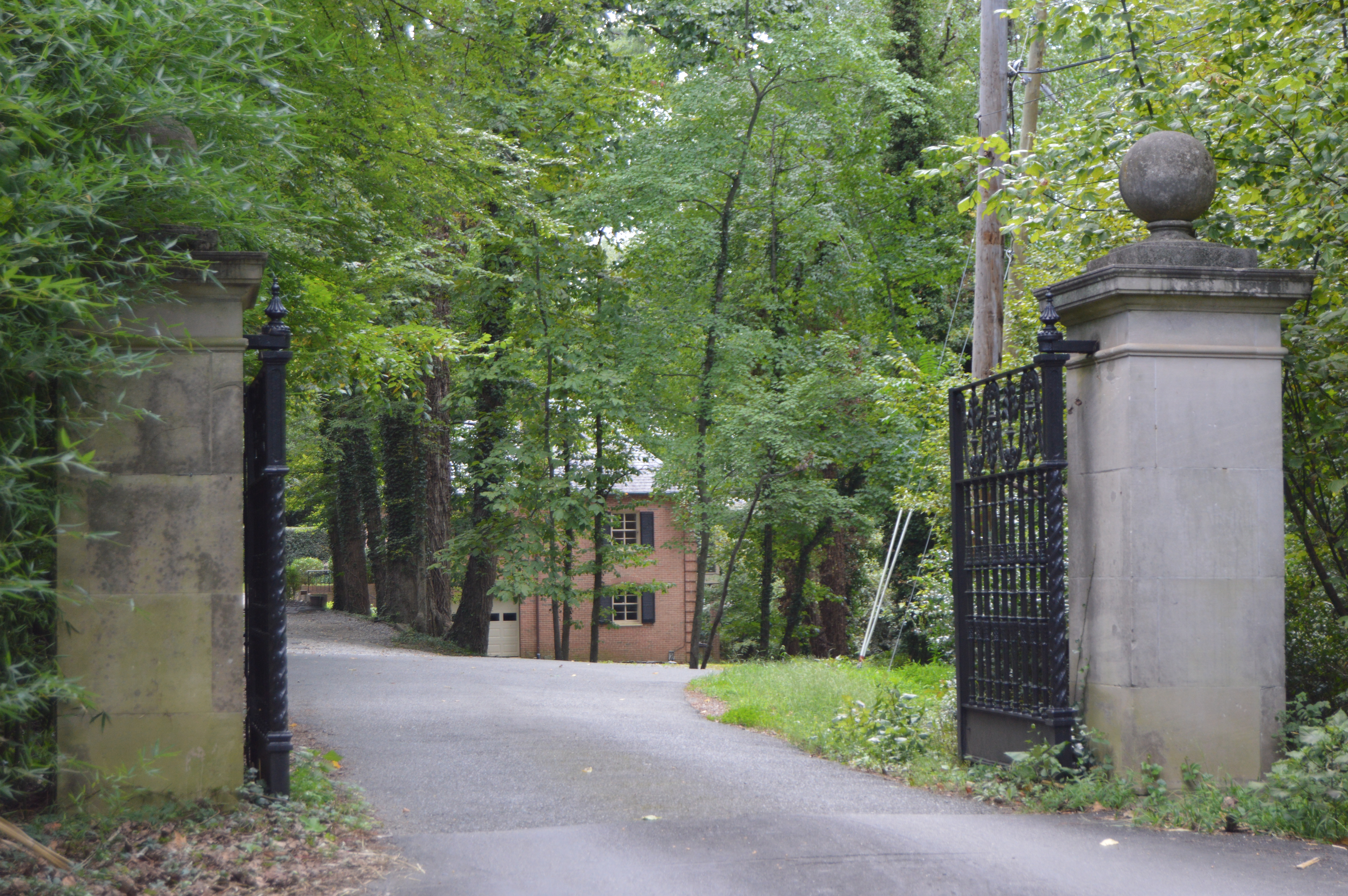
- Entrance to the property

- Location within Virginia Location within the United States
- Location: 1000 Old Locke Lane, Richmond, Virginia
- Coordinates: 37°33′20″N 77°31′3″W
- Area: 4.5 acres (1.8 ha)
- Built: 1962
- Architect: Richard Neutra, et al.
- Architectural style: International Style
- NRHP reference No.: 99000369
- VLR No.: 127-5810

Significant dates
- Added to NRHP: March 30, 1999
- Designated VLR: December 2, 1998

The Rice House is a residence on Lock Island in the James River in Richmond, Virginia. Designed by modernist architect Richard Neutra, it was built in the 1960s. Since 1999 the house has been listed on the National Register of Historic Places. The house is notable as being one of the only house in Richmond built in the International Style.

Characteristic of many of Neutra's houses, the architecture features strong horizontal elements detailed in what appear to be concrete, but are actually faced wood and steel beams. The 6,000 square foot house is made of marble from Georgia and is stretched out along a granite ridge running parallel to the river. Perched 110-feet above the James River, the living room of the Rice House offers a view overlooking Williams Dam. Fenestration is provided by expansive floor-to-ceiling windows and sliding glass doors. Other details of the house follow the International Style: exterior railings, balconies and layered, flat roofs.

== History ==
The Rice House is named for Walter Lyman Rice (1903–1998), a retired top executive of the Reynolds Metals Company who served as United States Ambassador to Australia from 1969 through 1973, and his wife, Inger, a native of Denmark, who commissioned Neutra in 1962. Construction took place between 1962 and 1965.

== See also ==
- National Register of Historic Places listings in Richmond, Virginia
