= Moore House (Ojai, California) =

- Location within southern California

General information
- Location: Ojai, California, USA, 512 North Foothill
- Coordinates: 34.45468°N 119.25287°W
- Construction started: 1952
- Client: James and Orline Moore

Design and construction
- Architect: Richard Neutra
- Awards: AIA First Honor Award

The Moore House is a residential home in Ojai, California designed by Modernist architect Richard Neutra in 1952 .

Neutra received the AIA First Honor Award for the building's design in 1954.

== History ==
Neutra designed the house for a 40-acre plot owned by James and Orline Moore. The couple chose the location based on its vicinity to the home of Jiddu Krishnamurti, of whom they were disciples.

One of the house's most notable features is a series of moat-like ponds surrounding the house. The pools served two functions, humidifying the air around the house and irrigating a nearby garden.

The Moores added a cabana of a style similar to that of Neutra in the late 50s, reportedly straining the relationship between the couple and architect.
