= Gerd Bucerius =

German politician and journalist

- Gerd Bucerius

Member of the Bundestag; from Hamburg
- In office 7 September 1949 – 22 March 1962
- Preceded by: Constituency established
- Succeeded by: Georg Schneider
- Constituency: Hamburg III (1949–1953); Hamburg I (1953–1957); State list (1957–1962)

Personal details
- Born: 19 May 1906 Hamm, Germany
- Died: 29 September 1995 (aged 89) Hamburg, Germany
- Party: Christian Democratic Union
- Spouse(s): Detta Goldschmidt (m. 1932; div. 1945) Anna Gertrud Müller (m. 1947)
- Education: University of Berlin; University of Hamburg
- Occupation: Journalist, judge, editor

Gerd Bucerius (19 May 1906 – 29 September 1995) was a German politician, publisher and journalist, one of the founding members of Die Zeit. He is the namesake of the Bucerius Law School in Hamburg and of the Bucerius Kunst Forum, an art gallery.

== Life and career ==
Bucerius was born in Westphalia, and studied law in Hamburg. Upon completion of his studies, he was named a judge in Kiel and Flensburg. With the rise to power of the Nazis in 1933, he was unable to continue his work as a judge. His first wife, a Jew, took refuge in the United Kingdom. Bucerius remained a lawyer, defending numerous Jewish clients and others who were targeted under the Nazi regime.

With the Allied victory in World War II, Bucerius became a politician and journalist. He was a founding member of the Christian Democratic Union of Germany (CDU) in 1945. The British tasked him with the reorganization of the senate in Hamburg; in 1949 he was elected as a deputy to the first post-war Bundestag as a member of the CDU. He retained his seat until 1962. In 1946, with Lovis H. Lorenz, Richard Tüngel, and Ewald Schmidt di Simoni he created Die Zeit, with which they hoped to found a great newspaper for the north of Germany. Even though the emblem of Bremen was placed on its cover by way of a logo, the newspaper's city of origin was Hamburg. Hamburg refused the use of its city arms for the publication, and so those of another nearby municipality were used instead.

Bucerius's villa overlooking Lake Maggiore in Switzerland, the Ebelin Bucerius House, was designed by the modernist architect Richard Neutra, and named for Bucerius's second wife, Ebelin. It was constructed between 1962 and 1966.

== Honors and awards ==
Bucerius is considered an important benefactor to Hamburg; upon the centenary of his birth, chancellor Helmut Schmidt called him among the most influential citizens of the city. His large fortune was handed over to the ZEIT-Stiftung Ebelin und Gerd Bucerius which Bucerius had created in 1971. The funds held by this foundation are used for the promotion of scientific, educational, cultural and artistic projects; the Bucerius Law School and the Bucerius Kunst Forum are its most important projects. In 2001, the Bucerius Institute for Research of Contemporary German History and Society at the University of Haifa was established by the ZEIT-Stiftung Ebelin und Gerd Bucerius and its chairman, Professor Dres. h.c. Manfred Lahnstein.

In 1986 Bucerius was given the Honorary Citizenship of Hamburg.

== Other activities ==
In 1983, Bucerius became a member of the advisory board of the Bertelsmann Stiftung and was an honorary member since 1993.
