= Kronish House =

Building in California, United States

Coordinates: 34°5′16.25″N 118°24′2.77″W

The Kronish House is a 7,000 square foot villa designed by Richard Neutra in 1955. The house is located on 9439 Sunset Boulevard in Beverly Hills, California in the United States. The house was designed for Herbert and Hazel Kronish.

== Architecture ==
The Kronish House features a formal, pinwheel design. Not visible from the street, the one-story house sits at the end of a 250-foot-long driveway on a 2-acre lot. With 6,891 square feet of living space, six bedrooms and 51/2 bathrooms, the contemporary home is the Neutra's largest in Southern California. The glass-enclosed garden area is visible from several rooms. The original pool was also designed by Neutra.

== History ==
The house is one of only three Neutra designs ever built in Beverly Hills, and the only one that remains intact (one was demolished, the other completely altered). It was originally built for real estate developer Herbert Kronish and his wife Hazel, who had bought the property from actress Shirley Temple In an October 1953 letter, the couple stated they did not want a design that looked like a wooden box or had a flat roof, radiant heating or sliding doors — Neutra trademarks. The house was owned briefly by Norton Simon and Jennifer Jones, before it was sold in 1999[provide citation, house was not sold in a third-party transaction in 1999 pursuant to public records]. Neighboring estates include Madonna's former Beverly Hills home.

=== From near demolition to preservation ===
In January 2011, the house was sold in a foreclosure auction for $5.8 million. During that summer, the new owners applied for a permit to cap the house's sewer line, which is often a sign of preparing a building for demolition. The home was in such poor condition that broker firm Hilton & Hyland was trying to sell it for its land value alone. Upon the news, the Los Angeles Conservancy, and other advocacy groups, lobbied the city of Beverly Hills to delay the demolition. Richard Neutra's son, Dion Neutra helped to lobby assistance to save the house. Among the alternatives to demolition being considered was relocating the house off site. Stavros Niarchos Jr., grandson of the Greek shipping tycoon, eventually purchased the house in October for $12.8 million, which was originally being offered for $13.995 million, saving it from demolition. As a consequence, the city of Beverly Hills passed unanimously a local preservation ordinance, requiring a 30-day holding period for alterations to structures 45 years or older designed by a “master” architect. In 2014, the architecture firm Marmol Radziner completed the rehabilitation of the historic home, restoring it to its original footprint, and also adding a guest house.
