= Clark House (Pasadena, California) =

Coordinates: 34.176893°N 118.175332°W

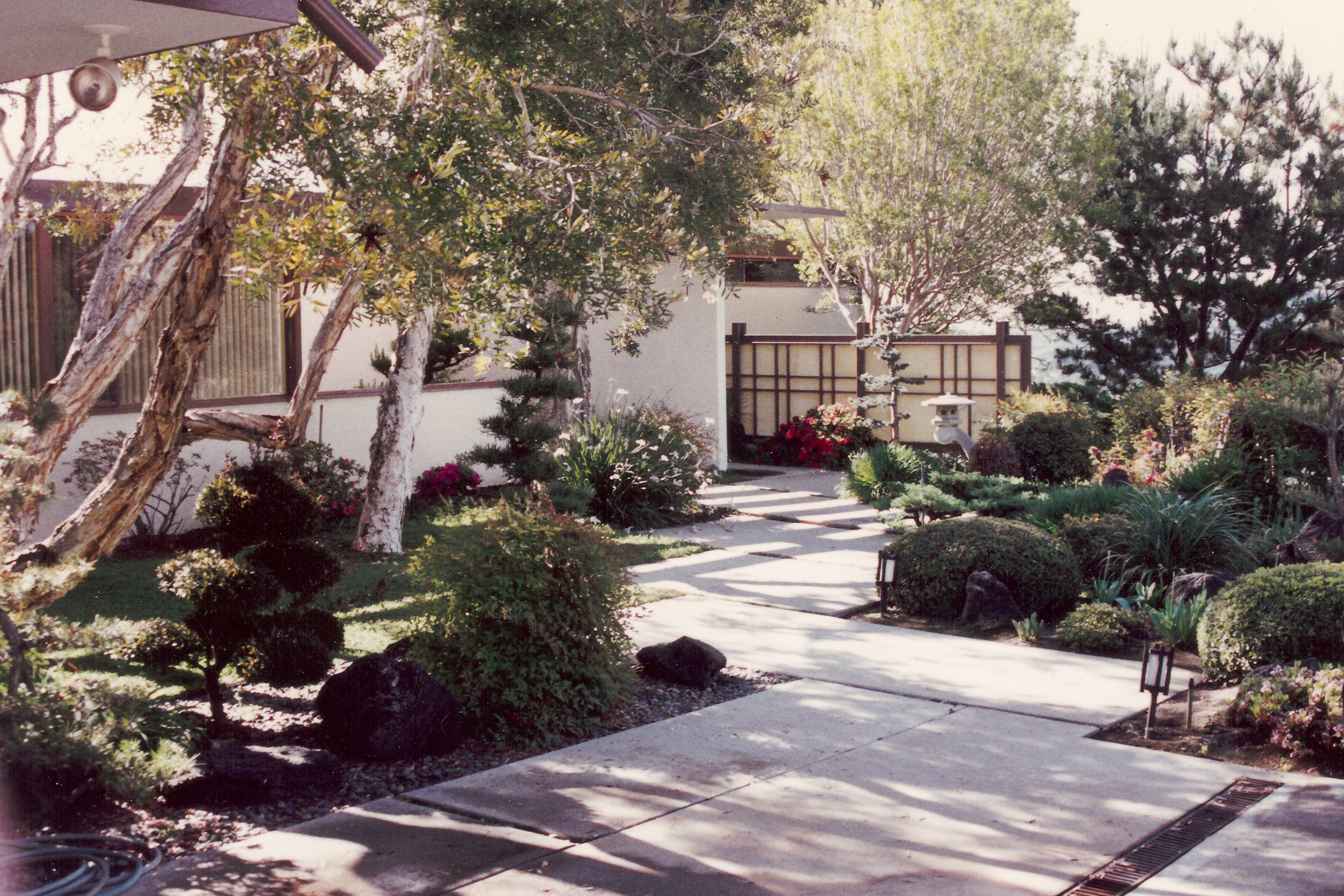
- Interactive map of the Clark House area

General information
- Type: House
- Location: Pasadena, California, U.S.
- Opened: 1957

Design and construction
- Architect: Richard Neutra

The Clark House is an International-Modernist Style residence designed by American Modernist architect Richard Neutra, and built in 1957 in Pasadena, California, United States.

== House siting ==
This 3-bedroom, 2-bathroom house was built on a promontory in the foothills of the Verdugo Mountains overlooking to the east the central Arroyo Seco valley in Pasadena, California. Views of the San Gabriel Mountains and Valley, the Rose Bowl, Brookside Golf Course and downtown Pasadena are visible through floor-to-ceiling glass windows & sliding glass doors running the length of the living and dining rooms in the central section of the home.

== History ==
The home was commissioned by John P. and DeVee Clark, a musician and teacher respectively, as a primary residence for the couple and their two daughters. The site, in the Linda Vista area of Pasadena, was purchased for $6,000 from the Beadle family in 1954.

The Clark Family with Richard & Dione Neutra in the Clark House in 1957, Pasadena, California

The Clarks attended a free lecture by Richard Neutra in Hollywood in 1955 and were enthralled with Neutra's philosophy, pictures and contemporary style. At the conclusion, they waited until everyone else had left and approached Neutra about designing a house for them. Neutra's first question was, "What is your budget?". On a whim, John Clark said, "$39,000," although that was considerably more than they had available at the time. Neutra said he could "work with that", but insisted on seeing the site before committing. Several weeks later, Neutra met the Clarks at the building site and he asked them to remain up on the road while he walked the property alone. After assessing the entire property, Neutra invited them to join him down on the building site and agreed to design the home.

The first set of architectural plans was delivered approximately five months later. John Clark felt that the initial design resulted in a living room that was not sufficient in size to accommodate his grand piano. Increasing the living room was agreed to, but for an additional $4,000 - bringing the entire cost of the home to $43,000. Neutra assigned building oversight of the house to John Blanton.

In 1968, severe rain caused a landslide that washed out the earth under the east and south sides of the property, leaving the swimming pool unsupported. Neutra had insisted on the house being secured to bedrock, so the structure itself was not in danger. Concrete retaining walls and pilings drilled down to bedrock were built, and earth was back-filled to support the pool and hillside. The result was a slightly larger backyard garden area.

The Clark House was nominated for Landmark Designation on August 19, 2002 and is designated by the City of Pasadena, California as an Individual Historic Resource by the Cultural Heritage Commission. The house was restored by the design-build firm Marmol Radziner.

== Description ==
The layout of the house can be divided into 3 sections from north to south, with views to the east and south. The north section of the home contains 2 bedrooms and a shared bathroom that also serves as the primary bathroom for guests. Also in the north section, a laundry room occupies the west side of the house. The large central living section is divided into two distinct areas by a brick fireplace and built-in cabinetry on the east side, with the kitchen and breakfast area on the west. The south section contains the master bedroom and bathroom, including a hallway with more built-in cabinetry beneath large glass windows that continue along the east-side exterior wall to the south end of the house.

A two-vehicle carport adjoins the house on the northwest side next to the "back" door that allows entry into the kitchen. The "front" door, also on the west side of the structure, provides entry into the south end of the living room.

The sliding glass doors open onto a large patio and swimming pool with small garden areas on the north and west sides of the property.

Japanese Ash is use extensively throughout the interior of the house. Custom-cut ash plywood allowed Neutra to keep the grain of the wood visible across long spans of built-in cabinetry found in all 3 bedrooms, the kitchen and the storage cabinets between the living and dining rooms.

== Modifications ==
The Clarks made several minor changes to the house over time:

- The fireplace was modified slightly to improve draft.
- The carport had been enclosed to create a two-car garage. It has since been returned to a carport.
- A breakfast area was created on the south end of the kitchen by framing in an existing enclosed patio. The original breakfast area had shared space with the laundry. At the same time, the kitchen cabinetry was slightly modified and the stove moved across the room, closer to the new breakfast area.
- New retaining walls and pylons built to reinforce the hillside and prevent the potential for additional landslides (see History above).
- Solar panels were placed on the roof to provide solar heating for the swimming pool.
- A Japanese garden was designed and built on the west side of the home, with water features, massive boulders and elaborate stone work. It has since been removed to restore the landscape to its original condition.

== See also ==
- Category: Richard Neutra buildings
- Category: Modernist architecture in California
