= Sidney Kahn House =

- Location within San Francisco County

General information
- Location: San Francisco, California, USA, 66 Calhoun Terrace
- Coordinates: 37.80098°N 122.40344°W
- Completed: 1940

Design and construction
- Architect: Richard Neutra

The Sidney Kahn House is a four-story residential building in Telegraph Hill, San Francisco, California designed by architect Richard Neutra in 1939. The building is Neutra's most famous house in San Francisco.

The building's top floor is designed as a living room and bar while its middle two floors hold bedrooms. The house notably features a number of south and east-facing balconies offering views of the Financial District and East Bay.

In addition to the design of the house, the Kahns commissioned Neutra to design furnishings. Most notable of the resulting designs was the "camel" table featuring legs that could "kneel," lowering it to a coffee-table height.

The building was subdivided into two smaller units by a later owner, yet has since been re-unified into one house. The house is near 42 Calhoun Terrace, where Diego Rivera and Frida Kahlo lived briefly in 1940.
