= Dion Neutra =

American architect (1926–2019)

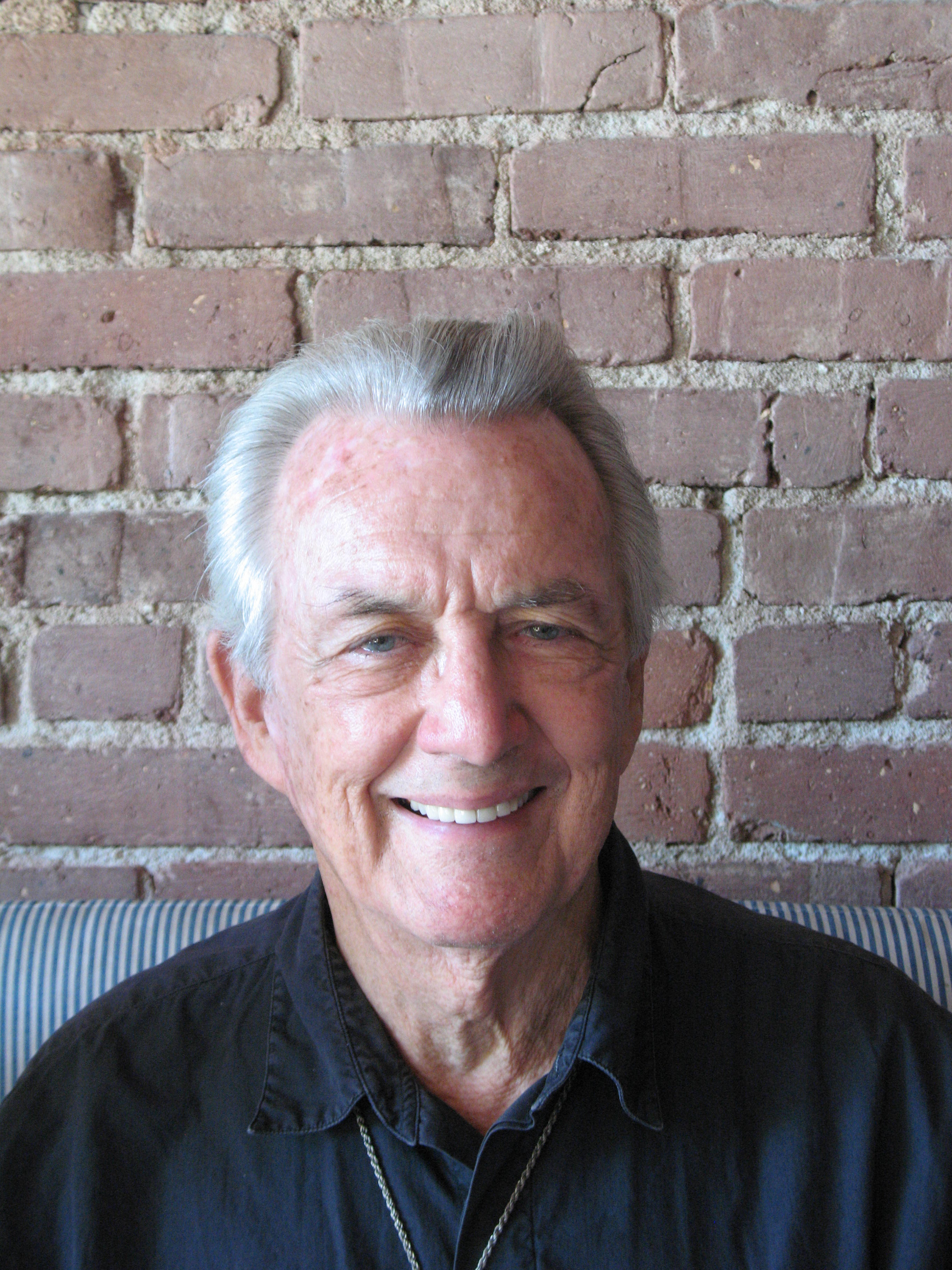
- Neutra in August 2010
- Born: October 8, 1926; Los Angeles, California, U.S.
- Died: November 24, 2019 (aged 93); Los Angeles, California, U.S.
- Occupations: Architect; preservationist
- Years active: 1937–2019
- Notable work: VDL II Research House (with Richard Neutra); Huntington Beach Public Library; Scheimer House; Kronish House; Treetops Apartments
- Website: neutra.org

Dion Neutra (October 8, 1926 – November 24, 2019) was a modernist / International style American architect and consultant who worked originally with his father, Richard Neutra (1892–1970).

== Life ==
Neutra started training with his father at age 11. He attended the University of Southern California, spending his junior year abroad studying at the Swiss Federal Institute of Technology architecture program in Zurich, and graduated cum laude.

Neutra became president of the Neutra company upon Richard Neutra's death in 1970. He worked with current owners of Neutra properties to update them sympathetically with original design intentions.

Neutra hosted the 85th anniversary party for Neutra Architecture 1926-2011 from April 8–10, 2011 at the Eagle Rock Recreation Center and the Neutra VDL Studio and Residences.

Neutra died on November 24, 2019, at his home on Neutra Place ("Reunion House") in the Silver Lake neighborhood of Los Angeles at the age of 93.

== Preservation efforts ==
In the late 1990s, he began campaigning to save his father's Cyclorama Building at Gettysburg on the Gettysburg battlefield in Pennsylvania, which had been targeted for demolition; by 2004, he had collected over a thousand letters in support of preserving the building, including one from Frank Gehry. The American Institute of Architects described the Cyclorama as "one of the most important buildings constructed by the [Park Service] during the 20th century." The long battle ended with the Cyclorama Building's demolition in 2013. In 2011, Neutra began writing a blog dedicated to the preservation of the 1954 Kronish House in Beverly Hills, California, then under threat of demolition. Neutra's campaign was successful and the building was saved. Among other projects Neutra championed was the 1963 Mariners Medical Arts Building in Newport Beach, California, which was restored in 2023. He was also concerned about the future of the Los Angeles County Hall of Records since the Records Department had been relocated to Norwalk, California.

== Selected works ==
- Dion Neutra Reunion House, 1950, Silver Lake, Los Angeles
- Kester Avenue Elementary School, 5353 Kester Avenue, Los Angeles (with Richard Neutra), 1951, Sherman Oaks, California
- Kronish House, 1955, Beverly Hills, California
- VDL II Research House, 1966, Silver Lake, Los Angeles
- Treehouse Apartment, 1968, Silver Lake, Los Angeles
- Scheimer House, 1972, Tarzana, Los Angeles
- Huntington Beach Public Library, 1975, Huntington Beach, California
- Canfield Elementary School, 1976, West Los Angeles, California
- Treetops Apartments, 1980, Silver Lake, Los Angeles
- Claremont Graduate Management Building, 1982, Claremont, California
