= Neutra VDL Studio and Residences =

Historic buildings in California, United States

- Richard and Dion Neutra VDL Research House II
- U.S. National Register of Historic Places
- U.S. National Historic Landmark
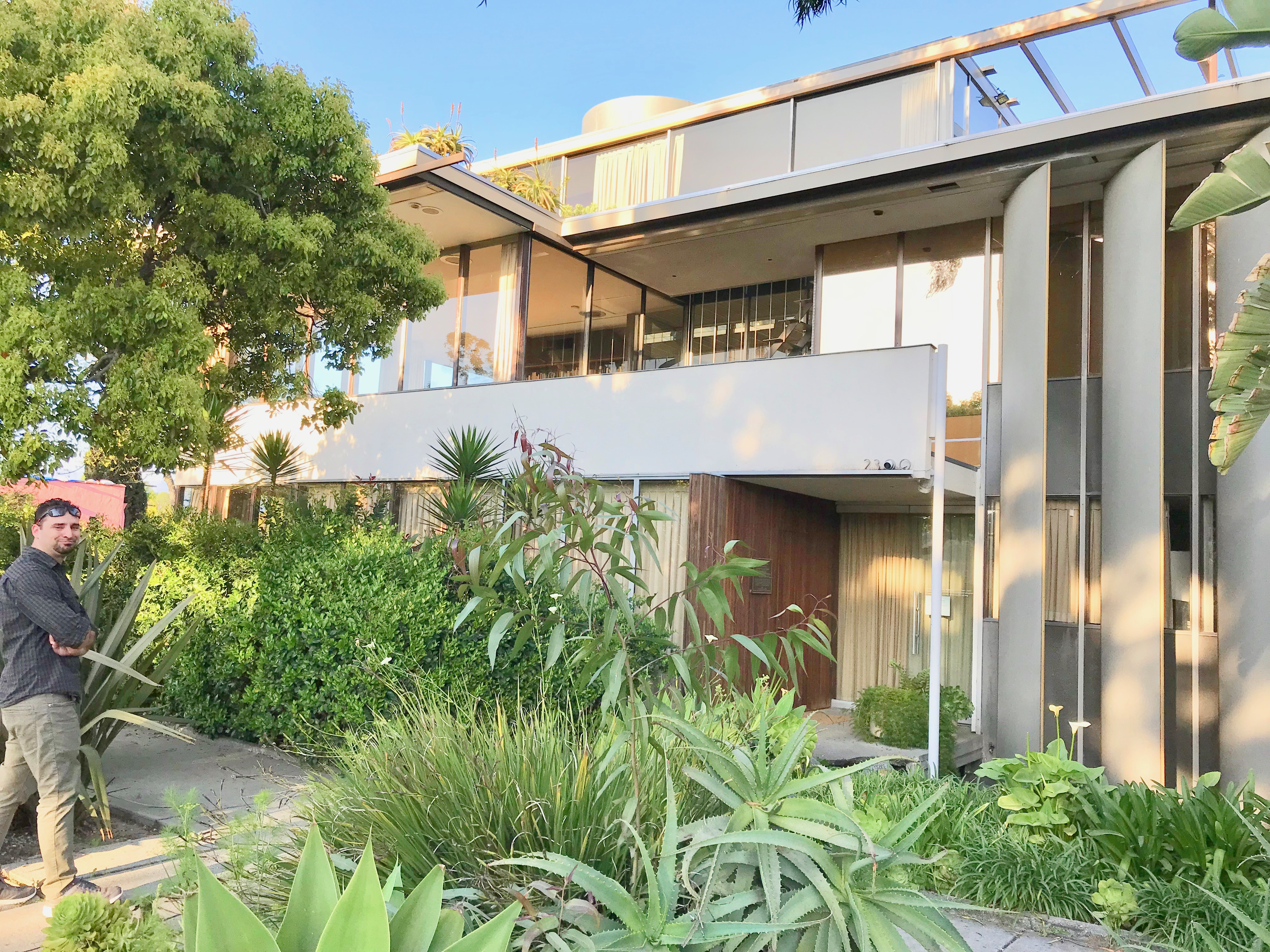
- Location: 2300 Silver Lake Boulevard; 2351 Edgewater Terrace; Los Angeles, California
- Coordinates: 34°5′54.43″N 118°15′37.64″W
- Area: 4,200 square feet (lot size); 3,501 square feet (structures)
- Built: 1932, razed 1963, rebuilt 1964
- Architect: Richard Neutra and Dion Neutra
- Architectural style: Modern
- NRHP reference No.: 03000774

Significant dates
- Added to NRHP: May 8, 2009
- Designated NHL: December 23, 2016

Neutra VDL Studio and Residences (Note: Also known as the Neutra Research House, the Van der Leeuw House, the Richard and Dion Neutra VDL Research House II, or the Richard and Dion Neutra VDL Research Houses and Studio) is the former home of architect Richard Neutra, located in Los Angeles, California, United States. It was designed by Richard Neutra and his son Dion Neutra. The house is currently owned by California State Polytechnic University, Pomona, and is maintained by its College of Environmental Design. The property was added to the National Register of Historic Places in 2009, and was designated as a National Historic Landmark in 2016.

== History ==
Originally built in 1932, the 2,000-square-foot (190 m^{2}) house was built for Neutra and his family and called the VDL Research House because it was built with a loan from Neutra's early patron, Cees H. Van der Leeuw, a wealthy Dutch industrialist and architecture aficionado. Neutra and his wife, Dione, raised their three sons at the house. He also ran his architecture practice out of a studio in the house until he later opened his design studio at the Neutra Office Building on Glendale Boulevard (a property that is also listed on the National Register of Historic Places).

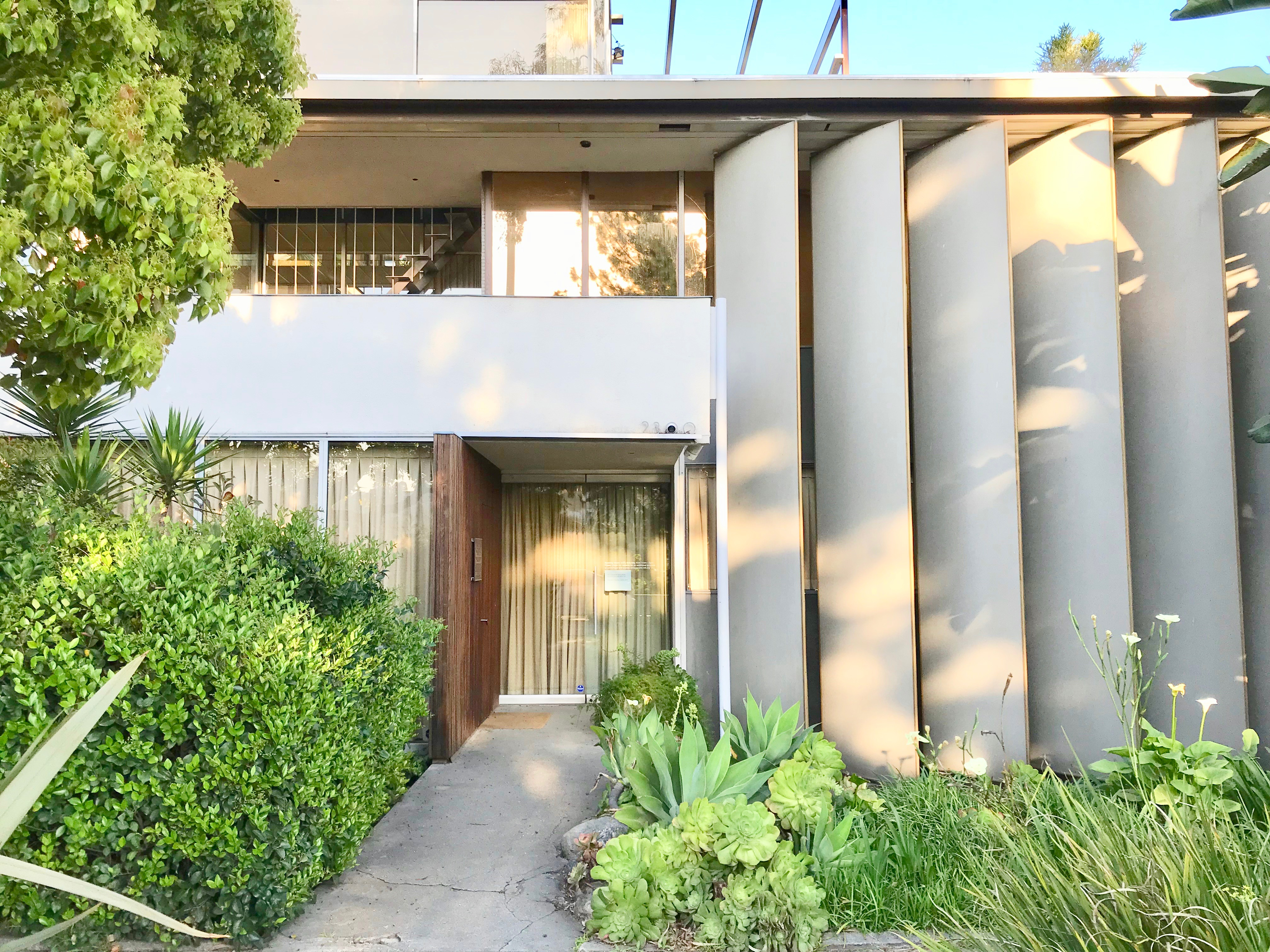

The original house was destroyed by fire in March 1963. Along with the house, the fire destroyed Neutra's collection of sketches, writings and architecture library. Neutra's son, Dion Neutra, rebuilt the house with his father's oversight. The original footprint of the house was preserved, though a number of changes were made in the design. One critic later wrote that the "original clarity was now gone, but the new house gained a jumpy visual complexity."

In 1980, Neutra's widow donated the house, then valued at $207,500, to Cal Poly Pomona to be used by the university's College of Environmental Design faculty and students. The building was in some disrepair and in danger of deteriorating further, in 2008, when a fund-raising campaign to preserve it was launched. Architecture firm Marmol Radziner volunteered pro-bono services that include repairs to the roof, the reflecting pool, and the building's water intrusion and waterproofing issues. Improvements were completed during Phase I and II of the restoration project.

== Design ==
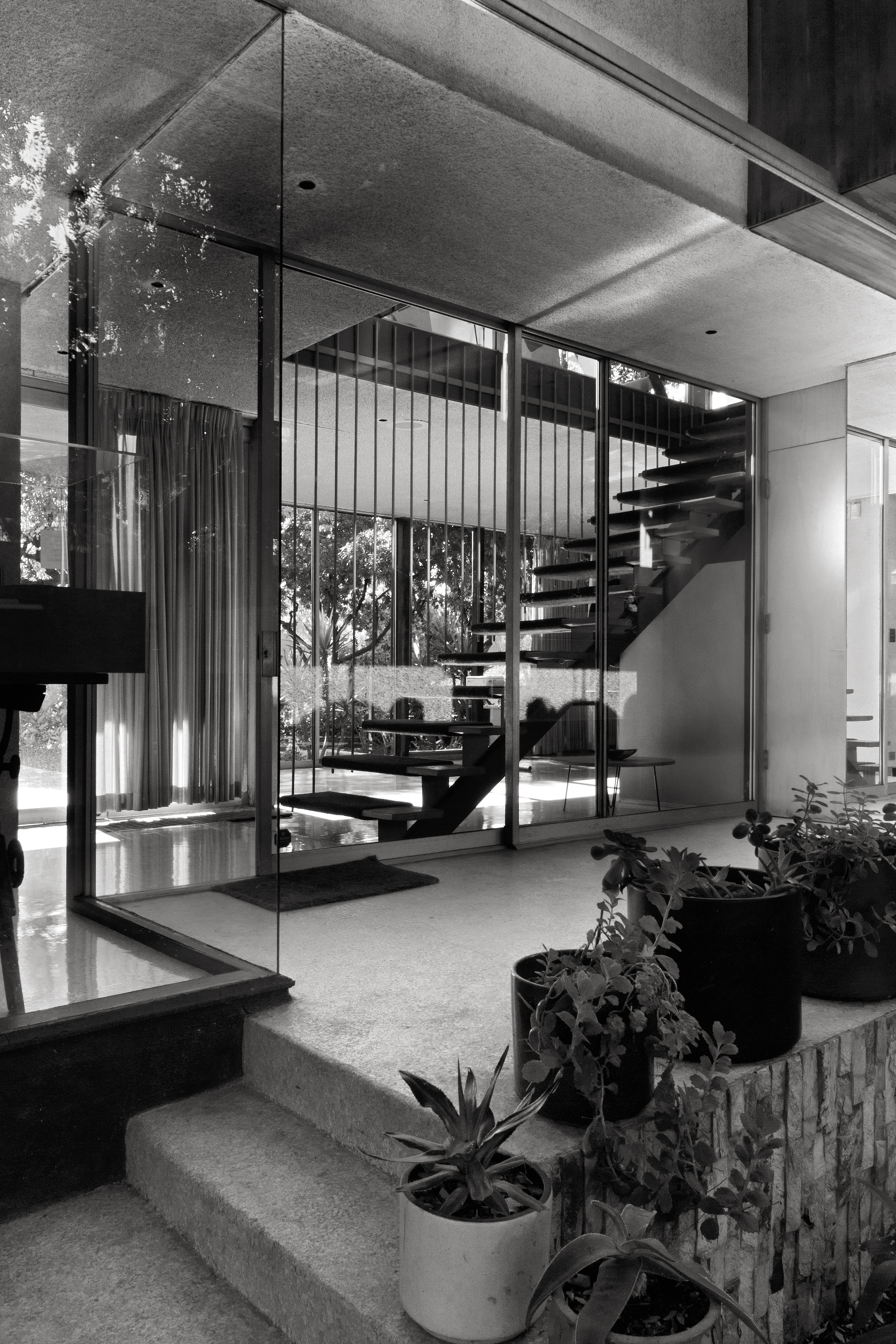
Downstairs interior

In his design of the VDL Research House, Neutra sought to show that the innovations of his Lovell Health House could be incorporated into designs for less affluent clients. Through use of natural lighting, glass walls opening onto patio gardens and mirrors, Neutra designed a space that was not confining and which reflected the nearby lake. Neutra later wrote the following about the VDL Research House:

I was convinced that high-density design could succeed in a fully human way, and I saw my new house as a concrete pilot project. I wanted to demonstrate that human beings, brought together in close proximity, can be accommodated in very satisfying circumstances, taking in that precious amenity called privacy. So armed with my memories and convictions, and in direct contrast to the sense-inimical mien of my boyhood surroundings, I planted three families on my ordinary 60-by-70-foot lot, next to Silver Lake. And I was able to arrange things in such a way as to embellish our lives with abundant plantings and bracing vistas. One felt a great sense of freedom in the VDL, as everything was carefully planned to avoid interference between the various zones of the house, and there were many options for getting off by oneself.

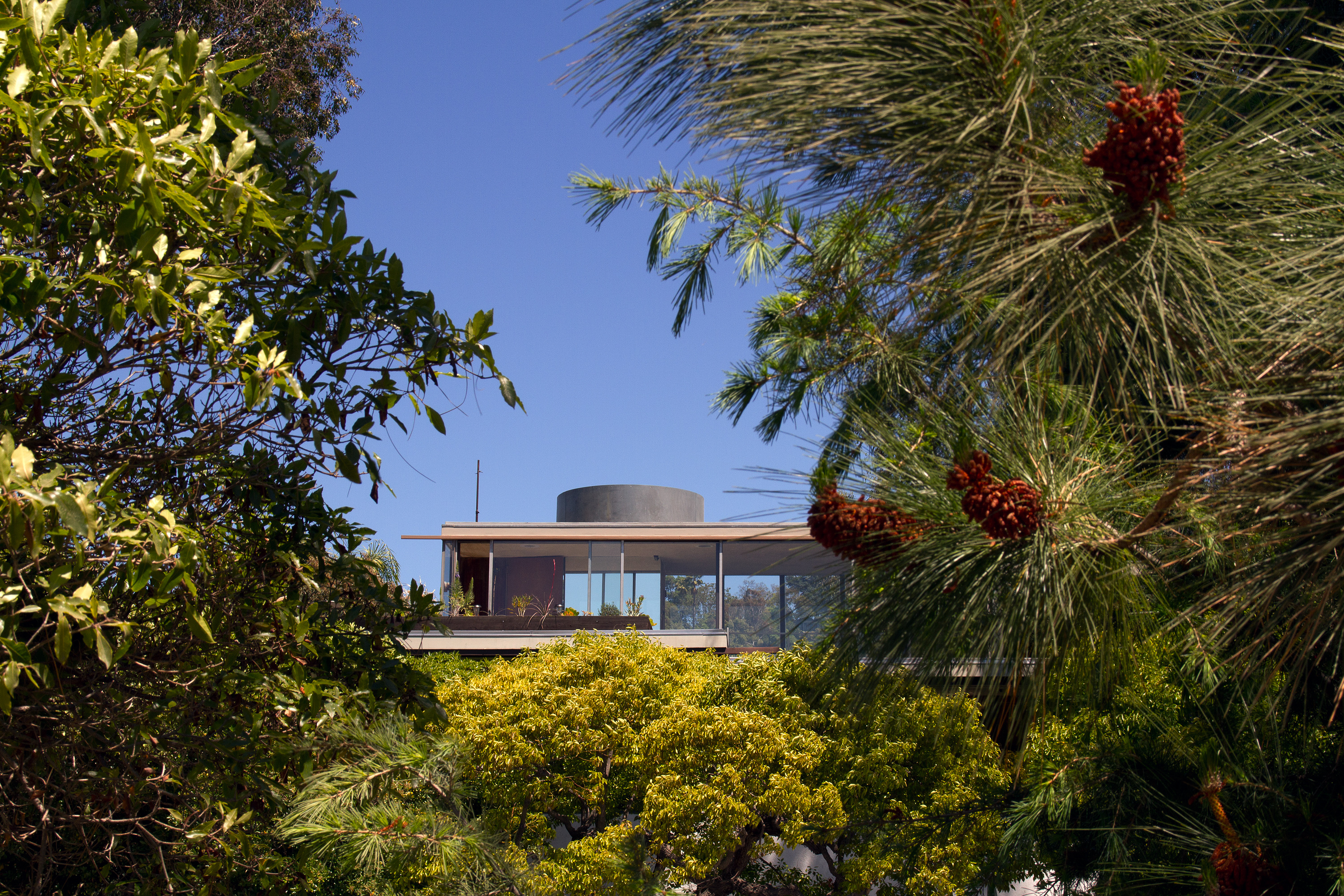
View of upper floor

Neutra later took pride in the fact "hundreds of perfect strangers have been coming by the house every year," many coming to a halt, "somehow mesmerized, and perhaps wistfully wondering why this constructive figment of clarity and composure hadn't grown on Los Angeles generally." It was not only strangers that admired the Neutra VDL compound. Over a forty-year period stars of the second generation of California modernism like Gregory Ain, Harwell Harris and Raphael Soriano started their careers here. Famous clients like the director Josef von Sternberg and Edgar Kaufmann spelled out their needs to Neutra here. A cultural salon for Los Angeles hosted visitors such as Frank Lloyd Wright, Alvaar Alto, Charles and Ray Eames and many others. The social history of this place has been documented at neutrahistory.org

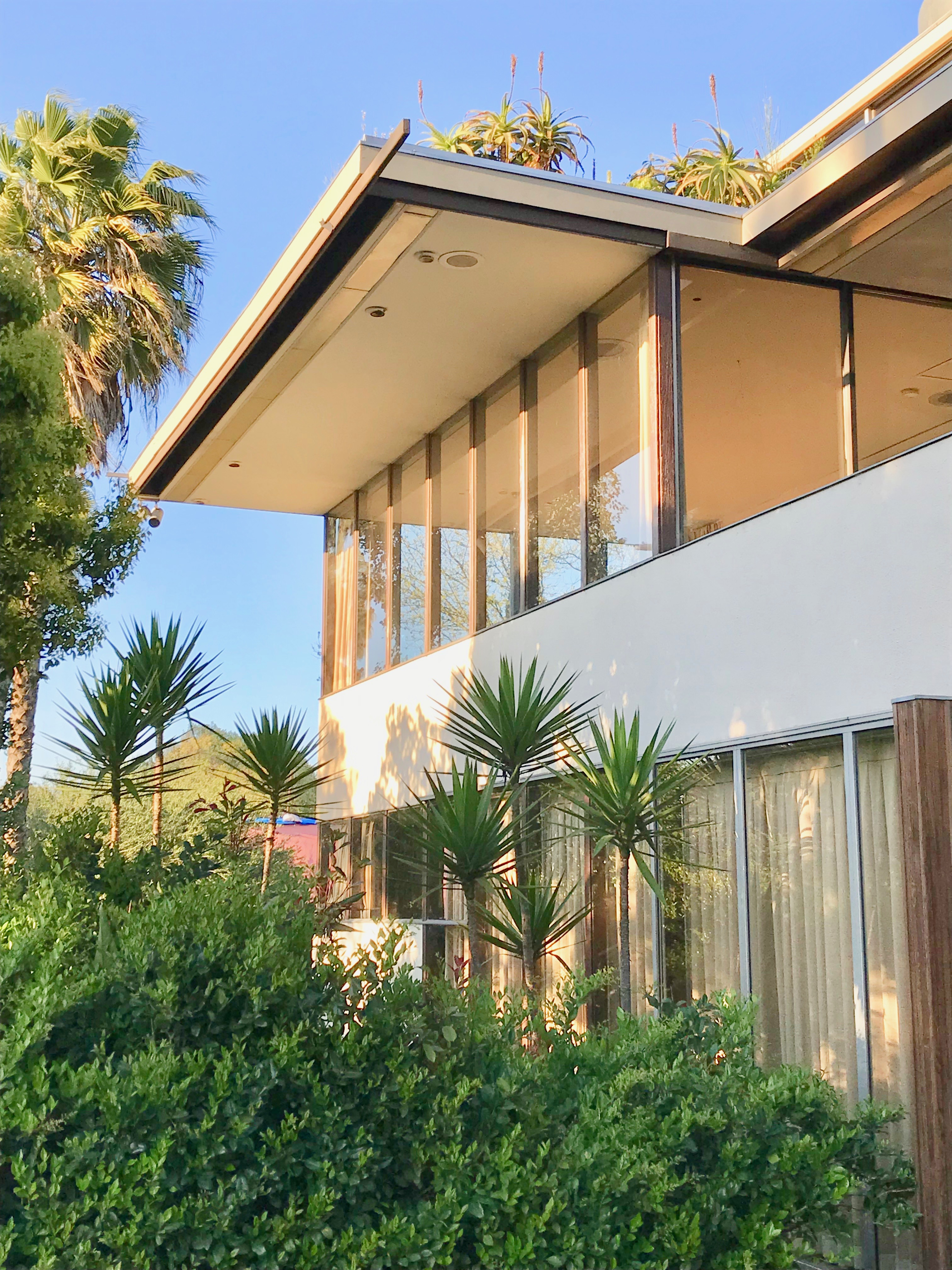

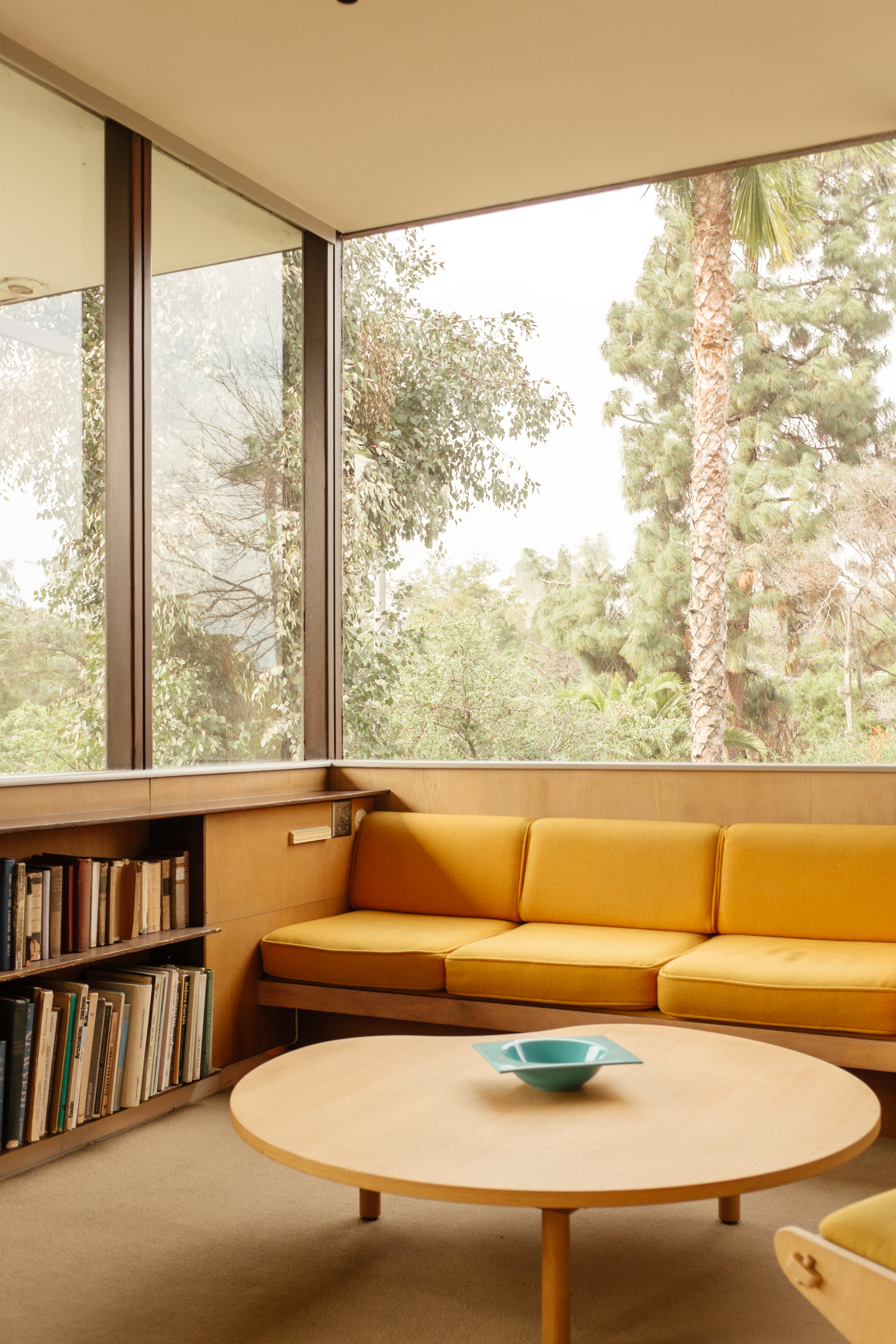
Upstairs interior

One critic later said of the house:

Even a down-on-his-luck architect deserves humane housing. When the budding Modernist hero Richard Neutra built a home along Silver Lake Reservoir in 1932, he had a budget of $10,000 and a tiny sliver of land. What he built became a nimble experiment in urban living.

The small rooms in the house are arranged around an open staircase and have "austere, built-in furniture, all in neutral tones." It has been said that the "house's strength came from its temporal quality: Light, water and air were meant to induce a wholesome life." The house was Neutra's third commission in the United States and was built four years after the Lovell Health House in Los Feliz. The Research House later became the focus of a cluster of ten Neutra-designed houses on Argent Place overlooking Silver Lake.

The house is located just a few hundred yards from the Neutra Office Building, Neutra's offices from 1950 to 1970, which is also NRHP-listed. The house is open for tours led by Cal Poly Pomona architecture students on Saturdays. It is the only Neutra-designed house that is regularly open to the public.

== See also ==
- List of National Historic Landmarks in California
- National Register of Historic Places listings in Los Angeles
