= Mrs. Mike =

1947 book by Benedict Freedman

- First edition
- Author: Benedict and Nancy Freedman
- Language: English
- Genre: Historical fiction
- Published: 1947 - Coward-McCann
- Publication place: United States
- ISBN: 0425103285

Mrs. Mike, the Story of Katherine Mary Flannigan is a novel by Benedict and Nancy Freedman set in the Canadian wilderness during the early 1900s. Considered by some a young-adult classic, Mrs. Mike was initially serialized in the Atlantic Monthly and was the March 1947 selection of the Literary Guild. It was a critical and popular success, with 27 non-US editions, and it was published as an Armed Services Edition for U.S. servicemen abroad. The work combines the landscape and hardships of the Canadian North with the love story of Royal Canadian Mounted Police Sergeant Mike Flannigan and the young Katherine Mary O'Fallon, newly arrived from Boston, Massachusetts.

== Plot ==
The novel is based on the stories of Katherine Mary O'Fallon Knox. According to her fictionalized account, in 1907 at age 16 O'Fallon travels to Calgary to visit her uncle and recover from pleurisy. There she meets and marries Mike Flannigan, a sergeant with the Royal North-West Mounted Police, moving with him to isolated posts in the mountain and lake regions of British Columbia and northern Alberta (Lesser Slave Lake). In the novel the Flannigans' two children die of diphtheria, and they adopt three orphaned children.

== Reception ==
Feeling that her story should be made into a film, Flannigan went to Los Angeles in 1945. Although it attracted little attention, an agent felt the story might be suitable for a book and introduced her to the Freedmans. Based on a five-page outline, extended interviews, and their research, they wrote a novel based on Flannigan's story. Late in life they reaffirmed that aspects of Flannigan's life were fictionalized, including her adoption of three children, and after Sgt. Flannigan's death in 1933 from a ruptured appendix Katherine Mary Flannigan left the North. According to Benedict Freedman, "The most important scenes—for example, when she leaves Mike and goes back to Boston—we didn't invent that. But we also didn't check her account of things."

A 1947 review of Mrs. Mike by RCMP member C.D. LaNauze, stationed in Grouard at the time of the story, noted several discrepancies. A journey allegedly requiring "weeks on the trail" was an "easy five-day journey", according to LaNauze; there was no diphtheria epidemic (and Grouard was served by a doctor at the time), and confirmed bachelor George Adams—not a Michael Flannigan—was the RCMP sergeant. LaNauze said, "Nothing in [the book] even approaches the truth".

A film version, with Evelyn Keyes as Katherine Mary and Dick Powell as Mike, was released in 1949. Flannigan sued its producers and the Freedmans for $25,000, but the suit was dismissed because she had a legal claim against the authors only (not the producers). The Freedmans published two sequels to Mrs. Mike: The Search for Joyful in 2002 and Kathy Little Bird in 2003.

Katherine Mary Flannigan married John P. Knox, and lived in Vancouver. In 1951 she published The Faith of Mrs. Kelleen, set in 1880s Ireland and based on the life of her great-aunt. Flannigan died on August 8, 1954, while visiting family and friends in Calgary.

John Henry Crosman adapted the novel into a newspaper comic adaptation, in the 1940s.

== Publication history ==
- Mrs. Mike, the Story of Katherine Mary Flannigan, Coward-McCann & Geoghegan (January 1, 1947), ASIN: B0007F29J8
- Mrs. Mike, the Story of Katherine Mary Flannigan. Toronto: Longmans, Green, 1947.
- Mrs. Mike, Paperback, Berkley (MM); Reissue edition (Jan 17 2002), ISBN 0-425-10328-5
