= Von Sternberg House =

House in California, United States

Coordinates: 34.251350°N 118.553630°W

The Von Sternberg House was a house designed by the architect Richard Neutra. With only one bedroom, plus bedrooms for servants, it was built in 1935 at 10000 Tampa Avenue, Northridge, on a plot of 13 acres (5 hectares) in California's then-rural San Fernando Valley for the movie director Josef von Sternberg. The house was demolished in 1972 and the land became a housing development. Much of the estate's land had been sold off (mostly for agriculture) decades earlier and its final size was four acres.

The design of the house contrasts with most typical homes. It had a very small number of rooms and a relatively small square footage. While it did have a few features of ostentatious display, such as a separate, larger and higher garage bay for a Duesenberg automobile in addition to the two other garage bays for lesser automobiles (in an era where even rich homes had only one or two-car garages) most of its characteristics were original and discreet, showing Neutra's attention to the integration of custom details, such as the surrounding moats.

The exterior of the house was all steel and glass, and the appearance of the house and of its landscaped surroundings was made of sinuous lines, yet the interiors were orthogonal, making furniture placement simple and easy. As in many others of his domestic designs, Neutra made heavy use of industrial windows and sidings, fulfilling both aesthetic and practical functions, such as making privacy screens and windbreaks.

Neutra was mindful of his customer's desires even when he found them absurd. He would later regale his friends with the story (among others) of Sternberg asking that none of the bathroom doors should have locks, in order to prevent his party guests from locking themselves in and threatening to commit suicide. As a movie director, Sternberg was well acquainted with the theatrical behavior of many Hollywood actors, while Neutra had a social life which kept him in touch with artists in other domains.

In the 1940s, novelist-philosopher Ayn Rand bought the house. Although concerned by the property's 20 mile (32 km) distance from Hollywood, where she worked as a screenwriter, Rand and her husband actor Frank O'Connor paid $24,000 for the house. In 1963, according to Rand's biographer Barbara Branden, she and O'Connor sold the house for $175,000. The sale was arranged by the post-Rand occupant, author Ruth Beebe Hill, who, along with her husband Buzzy Hill and collaborator Chunksa Uha, rented the house from Rand for many years after Rand moved to New York. It was purchased by the property's next-door neighbor who had it demolished the day after the Hills moved to Washington State, fearing trespass and squatting by "hippies."

Andy Moore (1956–present), who lived across the street from the house at the northwest corner of Tampa and Mayall Streets from 1961-1972, knew the Hills and Chunksa Uha and shot a Super-8 film, "Destruction," of the demolition of the Von Sternberg House (https://andystreasuretrove.com/destruction also https://andystreasuretrove.com/films). Several other of Moore's Super-8 films show the Von Sternberg house in the background, and he was a frequent visitor and later groundskeeper there.

== Notes ==
- Hines, Thomas. Richard Neutra and the Search for Modern Architecture.. New York: Oxford University Press, 1982.
- Neutra, Richard Joseph. Life and Shape. New York: Appleton-Century-Crofts, 1962.
