= Nancy Freedman =

American writer

Nancy Mars Freedman (July 4, 1920, in Evanston, Illinois – August 10, 2010, in Greenbrae, California) was an American feminist novelist, the co-author of Mrs. Mike.

== Life ==
=== Upbringing ===
Freedman (née Nancy Mars) was a professional child actress for touring stage plays, and she met her husband Benedict Freedman in 1940 in Hollywood, where he was working as a writer and she was trying to break into movies. They married in 1940 despite her poor health, which began with a bout of rheumatic fever at age three and lasted her entire life.

=== Writing career ===
She began writing novels with her husband in 1947 with Mrs. Mike, the fictionalized story of their friend Katherine Mary Flannigan who married a Mountie and moved from Boston to the Canadian wilderness. It became a bestseller and inspired a 1950 film adaptation. The two Freedmans wrote nine more novels together, and Freedman wrote several more by herself. Her later works, including Mary, Mary Quite Contrary (1968) and Sappho: The Tenth Muse (1998) have been called "ardently feminist." Sappho was later made into an opera composed by Daniel Steven Crafts, the libretto by Nancy and Benedict, with the premiere sung by their daughter Deborah in 1998. Her book Joshua Son of None (1973) was a political thriller about the clandestine cloning of a young assassinated President (strongly implied to be, although never actually named as, John F. Kennedy).

=== Family ===
Freedman's son, Michael Freedman, became a noted mathematician, and her two daughters also work in academia as a musician at the University of California, Berkeley and as the director of the medical humanities program at the University of California, Irvine.
