= Cyclorama Building (Gettysburg) =

Building at the Gettysburg Battlefield

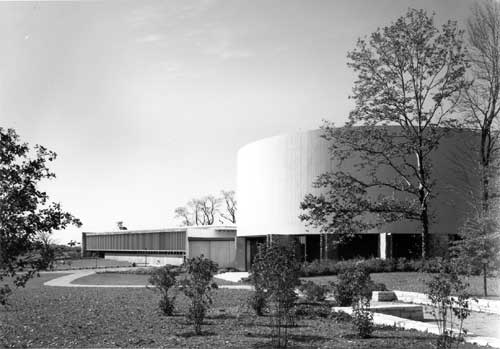
- Cyclorama Building in Zeigler's Grove

- Location within Pennsylvania

General information
- Architectural style: Modernist (Mission 66)
- Location: Zeigler's Grove, 125 Taneytown Road; Gettysburg Battlefield, Gettysburg, Pennsylvania, United States
- Coordinates: 39°48′56.8″N 77°14′2.9″W
- Construction started: 1958
- Completed: 1962
- Inaugurated: November 19, 1962
- Demolished: March 8–9, 2013
- Cost: $687,349
- Owner: Gettysburg National Military Park

Design and construction
- Architect: Richard Neutra
- Main contractor: Orndorff Construction Company, Inc.

The Cyclorama Building was a modernist concrete and glass Mission 66 building in Gettysburg, Pennsylvania, United States. It was dedicated November 19, 1962, by the National Park Service (NPS) to serve as a Gettysburg Battlefield visitor center, to exhibit the 1883 Paul Philippoteaux Battle of Gettysburg cyclorama and other artifacts, and to provide an observation deck (replacing the 1896 Zeigler's Grove observation tower). The building was demolished in 2013.

== History ==
Richard Neutra was awarded the design, and began work in 1958. The design included a central park administration office, space for the cyclorama painting previously held remotely at Baltimore Road, and an auditorium that opened out onto the adjoining lawn. Neutra subtitled the building "the Abraham Lincoln Shrine of the Nation." Orndorff Construction Company, Inc., won the construction contract with a bid of $687,349, in 1959. The site at Ziegler's Grove was intended to tie the painting closely to the battle location it depicted. The total construction cost was $959,603. The building was dedicated on November 19, 1962, the 99th anniversary of the Gettysburg Address.

Toward the end of the 20th-century attitudes towards battlefield presentation had changed, and the National Park Service sought to remove many modern structures from key sites. In 1977, the federal Advisory Council on Historic Preservation recommended that the Cyclorama Building be relocated to a less central portion of the battlefield. Funding requests to rehabilitate the Cyclorama Building were denied in 1993 and 1996, i.e., $2.7M in 1993 for roof removal/replacement, asbestos ceiling removal, patching cracks and treating masonry, and redesign of interior. But, in 1998, the Keeper of the National Register of Historic Places noted that the building possessed "exceptional historic and architectural significance," making the determination that the "Cyclorama Building was eligible for listing on the National Register of Historic Places," reversing conclusions by the National Park Service in December 1995 and the Pennsylvania State Historic Preservation Officer in May 1996. In 1999, the U.S. Commission of Fine Arts opposed its demolition. During this time, Dion Neutra, the architect's son (who worked on the design) launched a preservation campaign that generated more than a thousand letters of support. Frank Gehry wrote that Neutra's building "reflects the highest ideals of his own time, and deserves the highest appreciation of ours." The American Institute of Architects described the Cyclorama as "one of the most important buildings constructed by the [Park Service] during the 20th century."

In 2005, the Gettysburg Cyclorama painting was removed from the building for restoration (it would be relocated to the Gettysburg Museum and Visitor Center in 2007), and the Cyclorama Building was closed to the public.

After the building was not added to the National Register of Historic Places, in 2010, a U.S. District court judge ruled for the Recent Past Preservation Network (Plaintiff) that the NPS "had failed to comply with federal law requiring it to analyze the effect of the Cyclorama Center demolition and come up with alternatives to destroying it."

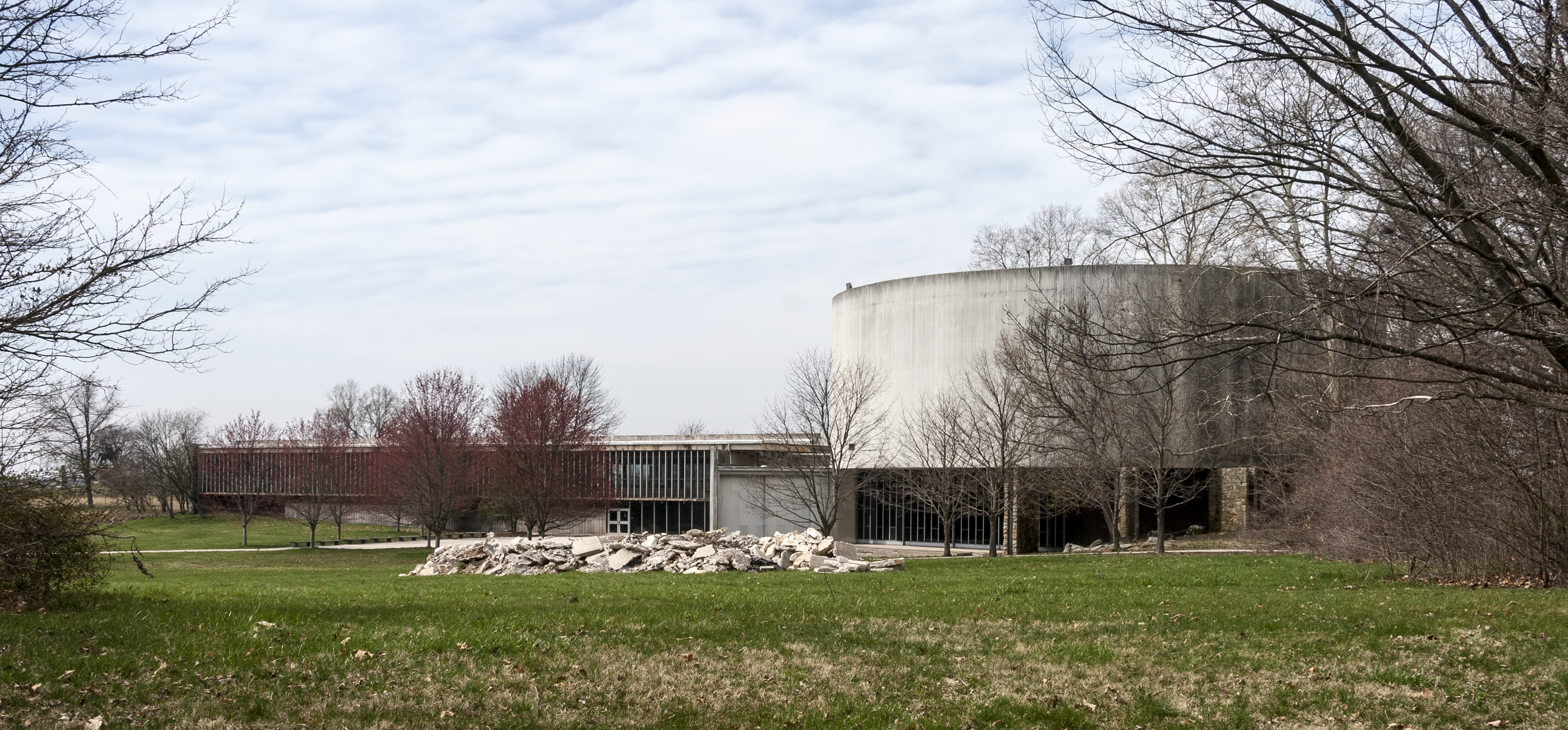
The Neutra Cyclorama in 2011

In August 2012, the court-ordered NPS study concluded that "the best course of action would be to demolish the Cyclorama Building that has stood in the park for 50 years." In January 2013, the Park Service announced plans to demolish the building during the winter of 2013. In February 2013, there was a protest.

In March 2013, the building was demolished. The National Trust for Historic Preservation cited the Cyclorama Building as one of ten historic sites lost in 2013.
