= Benedict Freedman =

American mathematician

Benedict Freedman (December 19, 1919 – February 24, 2012) was an American novelist and mathematician, the co-author of Mrs. Mike and a professor of mathematics at Occidental College in Los Angeles.

== Life ==
=== Upbringing ===
Freedman was born to a Jewish family in New York City. His father, David, emigrated to America from Romania. He studied at Columbia University from ages 13 to 16, but dropped out without graduating after the death of his father. He took up his father's profession as a radio writer, and moved to the west coast where he worked for MGM Studios.

=== Career ===
==== Writing ====
Freedman met his wife Nancy Freedman in 1940, when she was trying to break into acting. They married in 1941 despite her poor health; during the war Freedman continued to write, but also worked as an aeronautical engineer for Hughes Aircraft. The couple wrote their 1947 novel, Mrs. Mike, based on the real-life adventures of their friend Katherine Mary Flannigan who married a Mountie and moved from Boston to the Canadian wilderness. It became a bestseller and inspired a 1950 film adaptation. The two Freedmans wrote nine more novels together, and Freedman also continued to write for the entertainment industry, including credits in 1960 for the television show My Favorite Martian.

==== Mathematics ====
In his 40s, Freedman began studying mathematics. He earned a bachelor's degree and a Ph.D. from the University of California, Los Angeles in 1968 and 1970 respectively; his thesis, on the topic of intuitionistic logic, was supervised by Yiannis N. Moschovakis. On earning his doctorate, he joined the Occidental faculty, where he also came to head the general studies program. He retired in 1995.

=== Family ===
Freedman's son, Michael Freedman, is also a noted mathematician, and they have collaborated. Freedman's two daughters also work in academia as a musician at the University of California, Berkeley and as the director of the medical humanities program at the University of California, Irvine. He died in 2012 in Corte Madera, California.
