= Central Union School District =

School district in California, United States

Address
- 15783 18th Avenue Lemoore, California, 93245; United States

District information
- Type: Public
- Grades: K–8
- NCES District ID: 0607980

Students and staff
- Students: 1,783 (2020–2021)
- Teachers: 88.0 (FTE)
- Staff: 115.75 (FTE)
- Student–teacher ratio: 20.26:1

Other information
- Website: www.central.k12.ca.us

Central Union Elementary School District is a public school district based in Kings County, California.
