= Gettysburg =

Gettysburg may refer to:

== Events ==
- Gettysburg campaign, a series of American Civil War military engagements in the Main Eastern Theater.
  - Battle of Gettysburg, July 1–3 military engagements during the 1863 Gettysburg Campaign
  - Retreat from Gettysburg, the Confederate and Union armies' return to the South following the Battle of Gettysburg
- Gettysburg Address, President Abraham Lincoln's speech at the November 19, 1863, Consecration of the National Cemetery at Gettysburg.
- Battle at Glorieta Pass, referred as the "Gettysburg of the West"
  - Battle of Westport, also referred "Gettysburg of the West"

== Places ==
Pennsylvania-related articles

- Gettysburg, Pennsylvania
  - Gettysburg Battlefield Historic District, 11,000 acres (4,500 ha) of historic properties, buildings, and structures in Adams County, Pennsylvania
  - Gettysburg National Military Park, 4,000 acres (1,600 ha) protected by the National Park Service
    - Gettysburg Museum and Visitor Center, the National Park Service's reception center
    - Gettysburg National Cemetery, a district of the military park on Cemetery Hill
    - Gettysburg National Museum, the 1921 museum used as the 1974-2008 NPS visitor center and the corporation which owned it before 1974
  - Gettysburg National Tower, the former hyperboloid tower seized under the Takings Clause
  - Gettysburg Battlefield, the area of Civil War military engagements partially within the military park
  - Gettysburg Armory, a vacant borough facility on the National Register of Historic Places
  - Gettysburg College, a liberal arts college mostly within the borough
  - Gettysburg Railroad Station, a defunct railway station of which only the depot building survives, which houses a railway museum
  - Gettysburg Theological Seminary, the original name for the Lutheran Theological Seminary at Gettysburg
- Gettysburg Area School District, a region of Adams County, Pennsylvania, with a high school north of the borough
- Gettysburg Regional Airport, a general aviation airport in Adams County, Pennsylvania, west of the borough
- York-Hanover-Gettysburg, PA Combined Statistical Area, a combined statistical area in York and Adams counties
  - Gettysburg, PA USA, a United States Metropolitan Statistical Area that is the Adams County portion of the York-Hanover-Gettysburg CSA

Elsewhere

- Gettysburg, Ohio, a village
- Gettysburg, Preble County, Ohio, an unincorporated community
- Gettysburg, South Dakota
  - Gettysburg Air Force Station, a General Surveillance Radar Station in South Dakota during the Cold War
- Gettysburg, Washington
- Gettysburg Township, Graham County, Kansas
- Gettysburg Seamount, the highest peak of the Gorringe Ridge, a seamount in the Atlantic Ocean

== Entertainment ==
- Gettysburg: A Novel of the Civil War, an alternate history novel by Newt Gingrich and William R. Forstchen
- The Day After Gettysburg, an alternate history novel by Robert Conroy
- Gettysburg Cyclorama or The Battle of Gettysburg, an 1883 painting by Paul Philippoteaux
- Gettysburg (1993 film), a film based on the novel The Killer Angels
- Gettysburg (2011 film), a History Channel television movie
- Gettysburg 1863, upcoming film
- "Gettysburg" (The Office), a television episode
- "Gettysburg" (The Outer Limits), a television episode
- Sid Meier's Gettysburg!, a computer game
- Gettysburg (block wargame), from Columbia Games
- Gettysburg (game), a board game
- Gettysburg (1863), a trilogy of songs by Iced Earth from The Glorious Burden, 2004
- "Gettysburg", a song by The Brandos from Honor Among Thieves, 1987
- "Gettysburg", a song by Ratatat from Classics, 2006

== Other ==
- Gettysburg Battlefield Memorial Association, a former preservation organization for the battlefield in Gettysburg, Pennsylvania
- Gettysburg Electric Railway, the 1893-1916 Gettysburg Battlefield trolley
- Gettysburg Railroad, the first of several Gettysburg-named steamtrain lines servicing Gettysburg, Pennsylvania, prior to the Western Maryland and Reading railroads
- Forest City and Gettysburg Railroad, formerly servicing Gettysburg, South Dakota
- The Gettysburg Championship, a former women's golf tournament in Adams County, Pennsylvania
- The Gettysburg Times, an Adams County, Pennsylvania, newspaper
- USS Gettysburg (1858), a Scottish ship supplying the Confederate States of America until captured by the Union Navy and renamed in 1864.
- USS Gettysburg (CG-64), a Ticonderoga-class guided-missile cruiser
