= The Battle of Gettysburg (disambiguation) =

The Battle of Gettysburg was a battle in the American Civil War. It can also refer to:

- The Battle of Gettysburg (1913 film), a 1913 lost film, directed by Thomas H. Ince
- The Battle of Gettysburg (1955 film), a 1955 short documentary film, that was nominated for two Academy Awards
- The Battle of Gettysburg (1993 film), a 1993 film, directed by Ronald F. Maxwell
- Gettysburg Cyclorama, a nineteenth-century cyclorama painting by Paul Philippoteaux

== See also ==
- Gettysburg (disambiguation)
