= The Irish Volunteer =

Album by Dave Kincaid

The Irish Volunteer - Songs of the Irish Union Soldier 1861-1865

Studio album by David Kincaid
- Released: February 24, 1998
- Recorded: Studio 19 and Ted Spencer Sound, New York, NY; 1997 & 1998
- Genre: Celtic
- Length: 50:24 (US)
- Label: Rykodisc
- Producer: David Kincaid

David Kincaid chronology
The Irish Volunteer - Songs of the Irish Union Soldier 1861-1865 (1998)	The Irish-American's Song (2001)

Professional ratings
Review scores
Source	Rating
Allmusic	link
thewildgeese.com	(not rated) link

The Irish Volunteer is David Kincaid's first album of Civil War related Irish music. For years Kincaid has been the lead singer, lead guitarist, and leading songwriter for the American roots rock band, The Brandos. Kincaid, a long time Civil War enthusiast, assembled a collection of songs written during the Civil War era about Irish American soldiers fighting for the Union. Most of the songs only came with lyrics so Kincaid had to find traditional Irish music to set the lyrics to. Kincaid was devoted to historical accuracy in performing the songs, the pieces are performed only with instruments that would have been available to the people of the period.

With the exception of "Free and Green" all the songs were written either before or during the Civil War. The songs praise the Irish immigrant volunteers who fought for the Union, most of the songs mention Thomas Francis Meagher, Michael Corcoran, and the famous Irish Brigade.

"Pat Murphy Of Meagher's Brigade" is the only previously recorded song on the album.

== Personnel ==
- David Kincaid – lead and harmonic vocals, guitar, banjo, mandolin, and bodhran.
- Liz Knowles – fiddle.
- Jerry O'Sullivan – uilleann pipes and tin whistle.
- John Whelan – accordion.
- Ernie Mendillo - bass on "Paddy's Lamentation".

== Track listing ==
The writer of most of the songs is unknown but is noted where the author is known.

1. "The Irish Volunteer" written by Joe English – 4:34 (to the tune of "The Irish Jaunting Car")
2. "Boys That Wore The Green" – 4:00
3. "Opinions of Paddy Magee" – 3:37
4. "The Boys Of The Irish Brigade" – 3:10
5. "Paddy's Lamentation" – 5:26
6. "The Irish Volunteer (Nr. 2)" written by S. Fillmore Bennett – 4:21
7. "My Father's Gun" written by Joe English – 3:09
8. "Meagher Is Leading The Irish Brigade" – 5:35
9. "Free And Green'" written by David Kincaid and Carl Funk – 4:15
10. "The Harp Of Old Erin & Banner Of Star" – 3:44
11. "The List Of Generals" written by Joe English – 3:58
12. "Pat Murphy Of Meagher's Brigade" – 4:40
