= Among Thieves =

Among Thieves may refer to:

- Among Thieves, an Australian group, best known for their 1991 single "Faith in Love".
- "Among Thieves", a 1957 science fiction story by Poul Anderson, published in Astounding Stories
- Among Thieves, the 2009 début novel by Mez Packer
- Among Thieves, 2011 novel by Douglas Hulick
- Among Thieves, the 2009 David Hosp novel inspired by the Isabella Stewart Gardner Museum theft
- Uncharted 2: Among Thieves, a 2009 video game

== See also ==
- Honor Among Thieves (disambiguation)
