= Honor Among Thieves =

Honor (or Honour) Among Thieves is a phrase suggesting honour within a group that is not considered honourable, trustworthy, or morally righteous to outsiders. It may also refer to:

== Books ==
- Honour Among Thieves (novel), a 1993 novel by English author Jeffrey Archer.
- Honour Among Thieves, a 1947 novel by H. C. Bailey
- Honour Among Thieves, a 1991 novel by Donald Serrell Thomas
- Honor Among Thieves, a 2014 novel by James S. A. Corey
- Honor Among Thieves, a 2018 novel by Ann Aguirre and Rachel Caine

== Film and TV ==
- Touchez pas au grisbi, a 1954 French-Italian film released in the UK as Honour Among Thieves
- Adieu l'ami, a 1968 French-Italian film starring Charles Bronson reissued as Honor Among Thieves
- Dungeons & Dragons: Honor Among Thieves, a 2023 American fantasy heist film

=== Television ===
- "Honor Among Thieves", episode 7 of The Lincoln Lawyer season 4
- "Honor Among Thieves" (Person of Interest), a 2014 episode of Person of Interest
- "Honor Among Thieves" (Star Trek: Deep Space Nine), a 1998 episode of Star Trek: Deep Space Nine
- "Honor Among Thieves", episode 4 of The Flash
- "Honor Among Thieves", episode 5 of White Collar season 4
- "Honor Among Thieves", episode 20 of Criminal Minds season 2
- "Honour Among Thieves", episode 76 of The Bill series 9
- "Honor Among Thieves?", episode 16 of Miami Vice season 4

== Games ==
- Sly 3: Honor Among Thieves, the third game in the Sly Cooper franchise
- Subverted as « There is no honor among Thieves... » in an illustration of the Dungeon Master Guide (1979) of AD&D 1st edition.
- "Honor, Amongst Thieves", a mission in Red Dead Redemption 2.

== Music ==
- Honor Among Thieves (Artful Dodger album) 1976
- Honor Among Thieves (Edwin McCain album) 1995
- Honor Among Thieves, an album by Antiseen
- Honor Among Thieves (The Brandos album) 1987
- "Honour Among Thieves", a song by Gunship on the 2018 album Dark All Day

== See also ==
- Among Thieves (disambiguation)
