= Bombaj Štampa =

Bosnian musical group

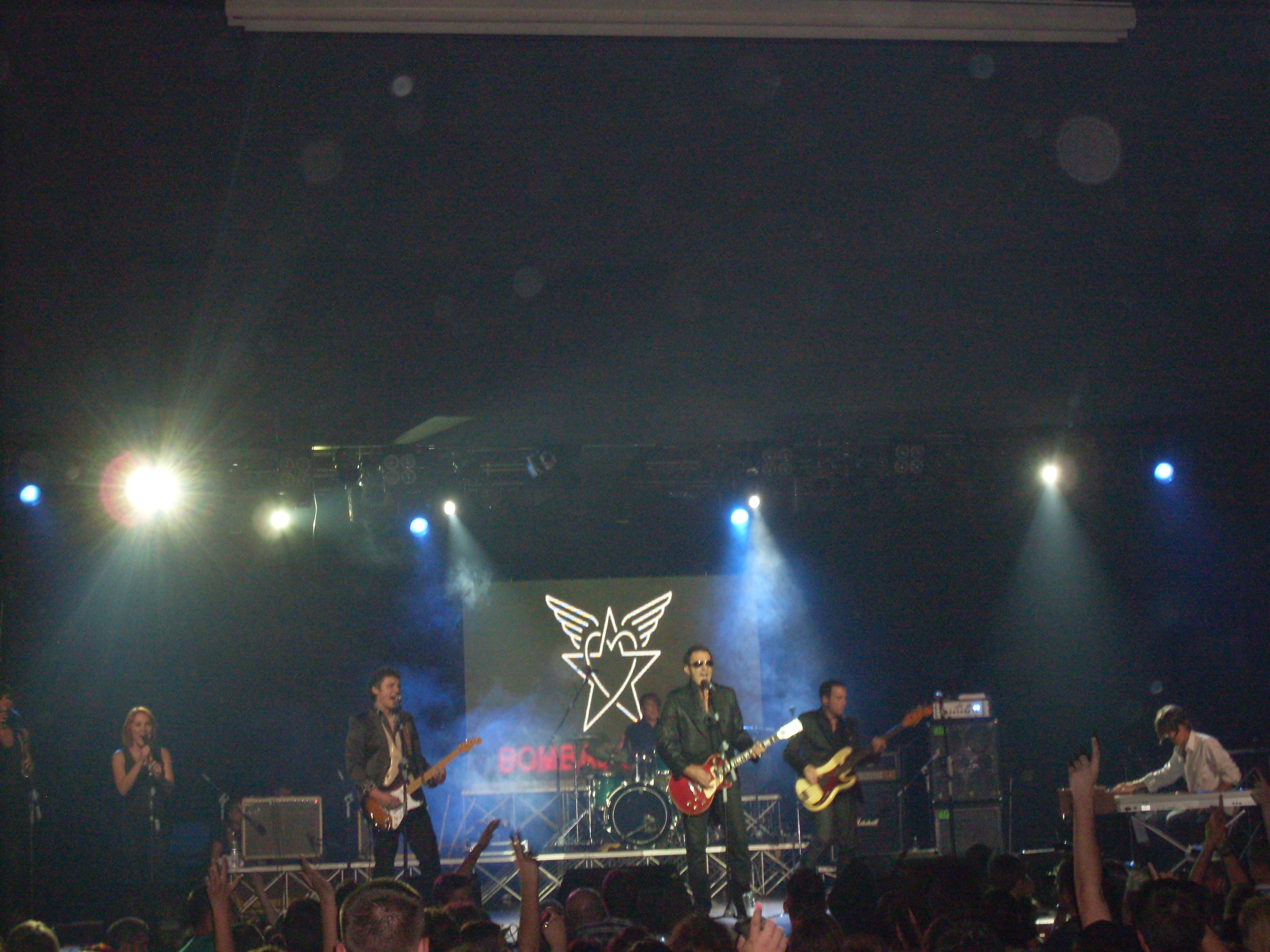
- Bombaj Štampa performing live in Sarajevo in 2011

Background information
- Origin: Sarajevo, SR Bosnia and Herzegovina, Yugoslavia (now Bosnia and Herzegovina)
- Genres: Punk rock; New wave; New Primitivism
- Years active: 1982–1992, 2008–present
- Labels: Diskoton, Dallas Records
- Members: Branko Đurić; Nedim Babović; Neno Jeleč; Nikša Bratoš; Ademir Volić; Ernie Mendillo; Gašper Oblak

Bombaj Štampa (English: Bombay Press) is a Bosnian pop-rock group from Sarajevo dating formed in 1982. It, together with Zabranjeno Pušenje and Elvis J. Kurtović & His Meteors, participated in creating a new movement known as New Primitivism in Ex-Yugoslavia.

The group was founded by guitarist Nedim Babović in 1982, but initially never had a stable lineup and therefore didn't perform much. In May 1983, aspiring actor Branko Đurić who sang with SCH joined the band.

One of their early hits was the football chant "Željo to je moj tim" ("Zeljo, that's my team").

Bombaj Štampa was not active from 1992 till 2008. In December 2008, group members reunited for a concert in Sarajevo featuring original guitarist Nedim Babović and drummer Dragan Bajić along with bassist Ernie Mendillo (The Brandos). More concerts followed and an album of new material was released in the Spring of 2010.

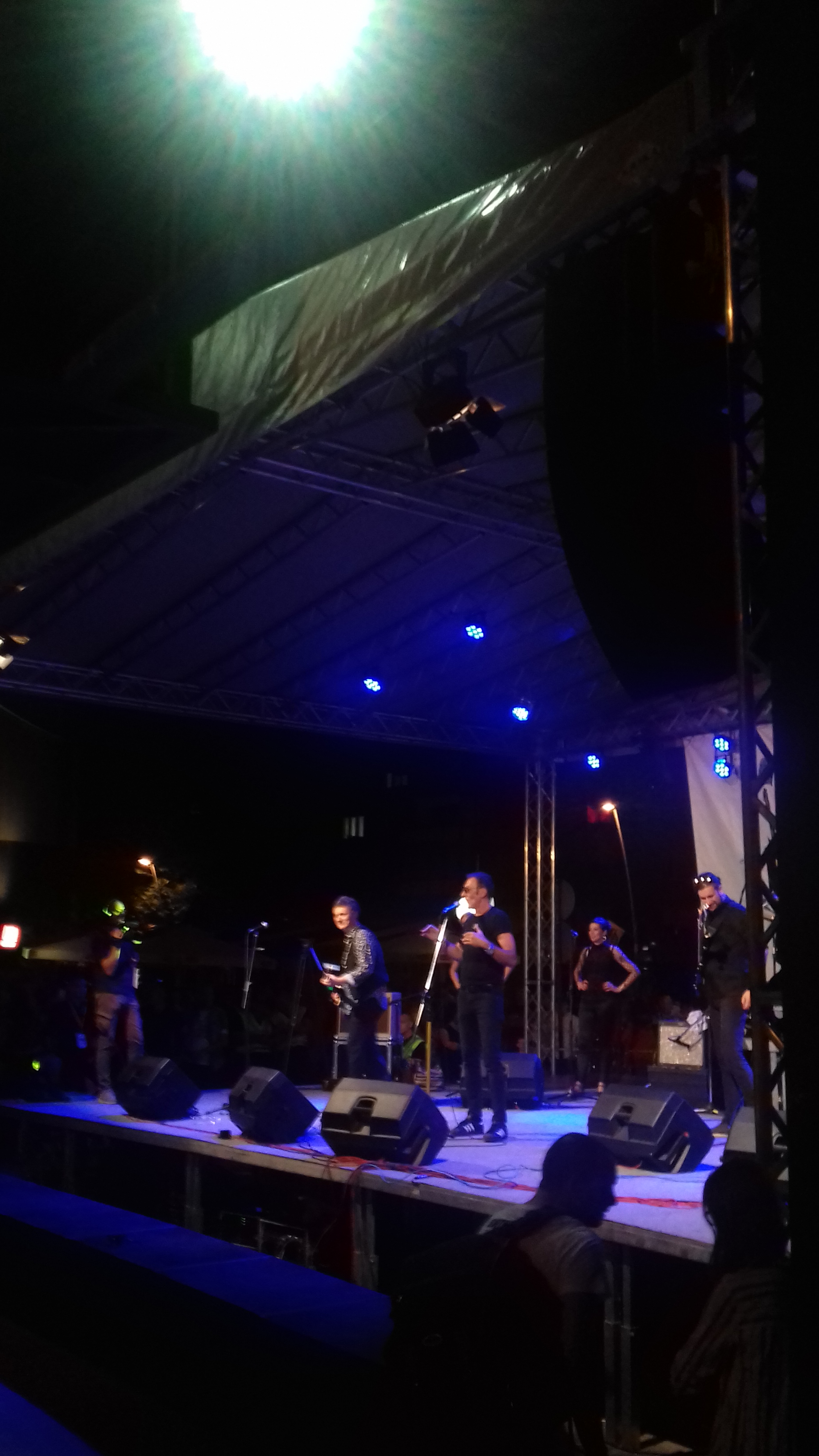
Bombaj Štampa performing live on Zenica summer fest 2019

On 25 July 2019 Bombaj Štampa gave a two-hour performance on Zenica city square – as one of many concerts during Zenica summer fest 2019 (second main show of this festival). They performed, among other songs, their new song called "Čekić" – to appear on the album that was due to be released in September 2019 – as well as one opera.

== Band members ==
- Branko Đurić - vocals, guitar
- Nedim Babović - guitar
- Neno Jeleč - bass
- Nikša Bratoš - keyboards
- Ademir Volić - drums
- Dragan Bajic - drums
- Ernie Mendillo - Bass (2008–present)
- Gašper Oblak - drums (2010–present)

== Discography ==
Studio albums:

- Bombaj Štampa (Diskoton, 1987)
- Ja Mnogo Bolje Letim Sam (Diskoton, 1990)
- Neka DJ Odmah Dole CJ (Dallas Records, 2010)
