= HELP! A Beatles Tribute =

Beatles tribute band

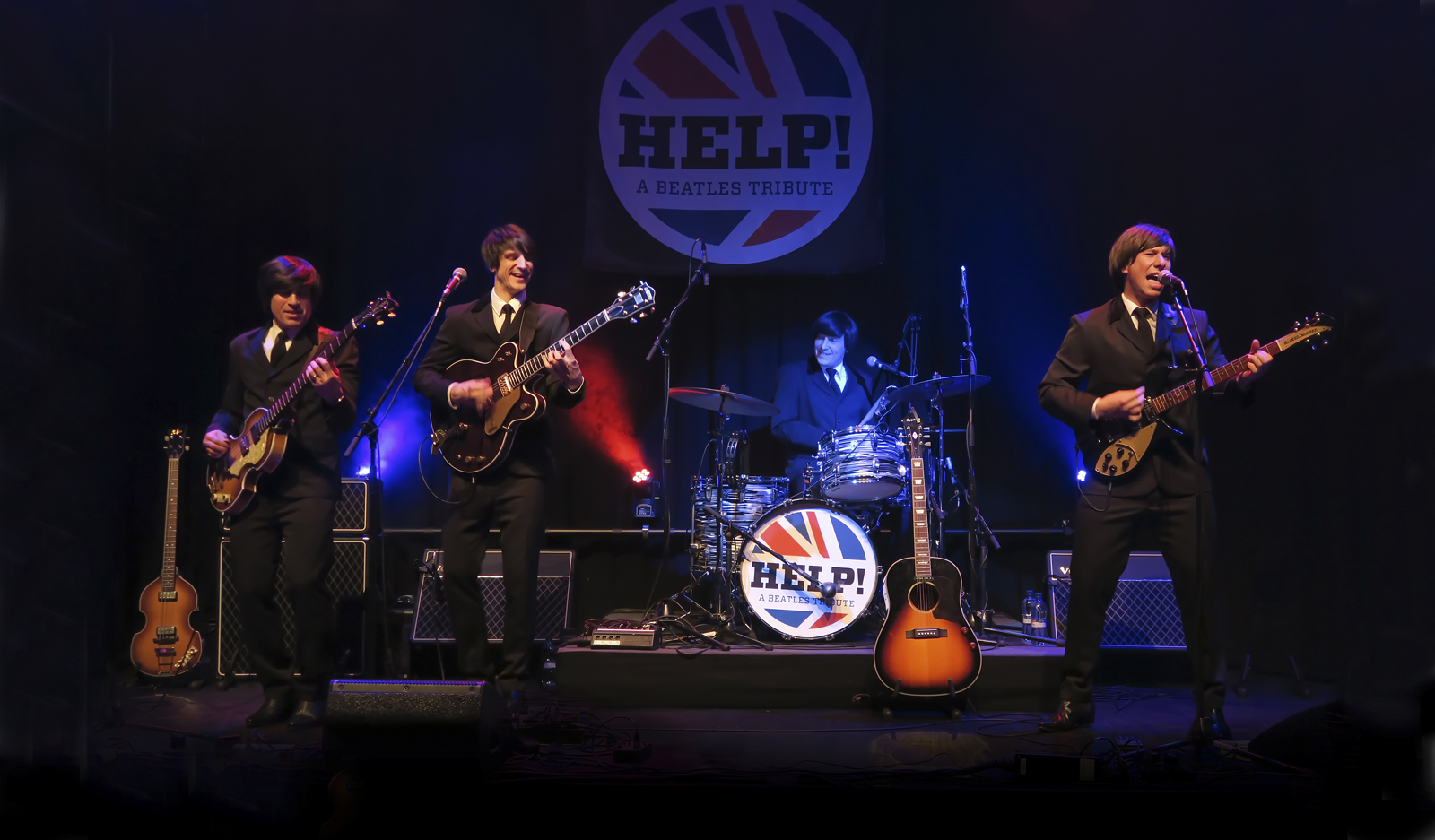

Background information
- Origin: Slovenia
- Genres: Rock 'n' Roll; Beatles tribute
- Years active: 2012-Present
- Members: Ernie Mendillo; Ziga Stanonik; Alen Kovse; Anze Semrov
- Past members: Matic Pelcel; Gasper Oblak; Robert McKenzie; Martin Lunder
- Website: www.helpabeatlestribute.com

HELP! A Beatles Tribute is a European-based tribute band paying homage to The Beatles. Founded in 2012 by Ernie Mendillo, former member of The Brandos, the group began performing Beatles music throughout Europe shortly thereafter.

The current line-up includes Mendillo, along with Ziga Stanonik, Anze Semrov and Alen Kovse. HELP! A Beatles Tribute have been performing since 2012, covering over 60 Beatles' songs.

They have brought the music of The Beatles to 19 European countries to date including England, Russia, France, Germany, Finland, Greece, The Netherlands, Switzerland, Austria and Spain. The band also performed their first show in Asia with two appearances in Bahrain in 2021.

== History ==
In early 2012, American musician and Slovene resident Ernie Mendillo was approached by the British Chambers of Commerce to participate in a charity event sponsored by the Lions Club in Ljubljana, Slovenia in July 2012. After much preparation and a favorable reception, the band decided to continue performing with a number of appearances in their native Slovenia. In early 2013 a decision was made to perform as a proper tribute act in costume. The band set out to arrange concerts throughout Europe and now perform around 100 shows a year across the continent.

== Notable appearances ==
- Invited to perform at Liverpool’s International Beatleweek in 2015.
- Invited to perform at the 50th birthday party of Russian billionaire Mikhail Prokhorov in Moscow, Russia
- Two performances during the festivities commemorating the 50th anniversary of the making of Help! (film) in Obertauern, Austria
- Beatles Night 2016 - Wasquehal (Lille), France
- Tampere Beatles Happening 2017 - Tampere, Finland
- Camogli Beatles Day 2018 - Camogli (Genova), Italy
- Beatle Day 2018 - Gothenburg, Sweden
- Beatlesfestivalen 2019 - Beitstolen, Norway
- Inn4tler Sommer 2023 - Ried im Innkreis, Austria

== Members ==
- Ernie Mendillo (2012–present) as Paul McCartney
- Alen Kovse (2022–present) as John Lennon
- Ziga Stanonik (2013–present) as George Harrison
- Anze Semrov (2019–present) as Ringo Starr

== Past Members ==
- Matic Pelcel (2016–2022) as John Lennon
- Gasper Oblak (2012–2019) as Ringo Starr
- Robert McKenzie (2013-2015) as John Lennon
- Martin Lunder (2012-2013) as George Harrison
