= The List of Generals =

1864 song written by Joe English

"The List of Generals" is a song written by New York music hall performer and songwriter Joe English in 1864. The song was written to praise the commanders in the Union Army during the American Civil War. It is sung to the melody of "Doran's Ass." The song is known for its praise of generals, several of whom were not effective leaders. Most notably it praises George B. McClellan, a popular leader but a poor strategist, and demands he be restored to command of the Union Army.

There are two recorded versions of the song. One can be found on the album The Irish Volunteer.

There is another version of this song which can be found and is played for the closing credits of "Civil War Minutes - Union Volume 1". This can be found in Amazon Prime.

== Lyrics ==
Since first the dirty Southern traitors, this foul Secession War began

When all them treacherous alligators, commenced the row at Charleston

Columbia's flag—the Star of Freedom—still has ruled on land and say

Fools may rave, but never heed them—to bate our foes we know the way

(Chorus)

Whack, fal de ral, da to ra laddie

Whack, fal de ral, da to ra lay

Whack, fal de ral, da to ra laddie

Whack, fal de ral, da to ra lay

Volunteers we have by thousands, generals trusty, true, and brave

For the union they arouse, and all would die our flag to save

Butler down at New Orleans, he kept the rebel host at bay

On them there to draw the reins, he quickly showed he knew the way

(Chorus)

Gallant Meade, a hero truly, at Gettysburg the foe met he;

And there he gave them Ballyhooly—Oh, how are you, General Lee?

Rosecrans, a soldier thorough—that's a fact that none can gainsay

The rebels met at Murfreesboro, to rout them there he knew the way

(Chorus)

Little Sigel, for the Germans, he has bravely stood the test;

Dix and Banks, Burnside and Sherman, all have nobly done their best

General Meagher has shown his mettle, Corcoran too, was in the fray

The foes of Uncle Sam to settle, the Irish boys they know the way

(Chorus)

Then there's General Daniel Sickles, from the field ne'er stirs a peg

The foes catastrophe he tickles—gallant Dan has lost a leg

General Grant he gives them thunder, at Vicksburg he won the day

Then to make the foe knock under, at Chattanooga knew the way

(Chorus)

But to call the list of fame, I haven't room now in my song

For, to go through each General's name, it would keep me singing all night long

But of one more I will be telling, and who should be restored straightway

To put an end to this rebellion—Little Mac, he knows the way

(Chorus)

== List of Generals praised in the song ==
- Major General Benjamin Franklin Butler
- Major General George Meade
- Major General William Rosecrans
- Major General Franz Sigel
- Major General John Adams Dix
- Major General Nathaniel P. Banks
- Major General Ambrose Burnside
- Major General William Tecumseh Sherman
- Brigadier General Thomas Francis Meagher
- Brigadier General Michael Corcoran
- Major General Daniel Sickles
- Lieutenant General Ulysses S. Grant
- Major General George B. McClellan
