= Mez Packer =

English novelist

- Born: Essex
- Education: Doctor of Philosophy
- Alma mater: University of Warwick; University of Huddersfield
- Occupation: Novelist, university teacher
- Employer: Coventry University
- Website: www.mezpacker.co.uk

Mez Packer is an English novelist. She is the author of Among Thieves and The Game Is Altered and lectures at Coventry University.

== Biography ==
Packer was born in Essex, England and spent her early years amongst the Plymouth Brethren, in Essex. She attended Warwick University from 1984 to 1988, gaining a degree in Philosophy and literature.

From the late 1990s to 2003, she worked as a web designer, BBC broadcast journalist and content producer. She continues her work in Internet media and communications.

Racism is a theme central to her first novel, Among Thieves, published in 2009. Cathi Unsworth of The Guardian praised it as "a highly original debut".

Her second novel, The Game Is Altered, in the speculative fiction genre, was published in 2012. She describes it as "a hybrid literary form".

She is senior lecturer in interactive media and a visiting lecturer in creative writing, at Coventry University.

In 2019, Packer obtained a PhD from the University of Huddersfield, supervised by Sarah Falcus, with a thesis entitled "Genre and language: defining temporal, physical and non-physical spaces in speculative techno-dystopian fiction".

== Prizes ==
Among Thieves was shortlisted for the 2010 Commonwealth Writers' Prize Best First Book – South Asia and Europe, longlisted for the 2010 Authors' Club Best First Novel Award and shortlisted for The People's Book Prize. It won the 2010 Coventry Inspiration Award.

== Bibliography ==
=== Novels ===
- —— (2009). Among Thieves. Tindal Street Press. ISBN 9780955647628.
- —— (2012). The Game Is Altered. Tindal Street Press. ISBN 9781906994310.

=== Other work ===
- Arnold, G.; Bell, J, eds. (2013). "Mr Spider". The Sea in Birmingham. Birmingham: TSFG Press. pp. 2–15.
