= Paul Philippoteaux =

French painter

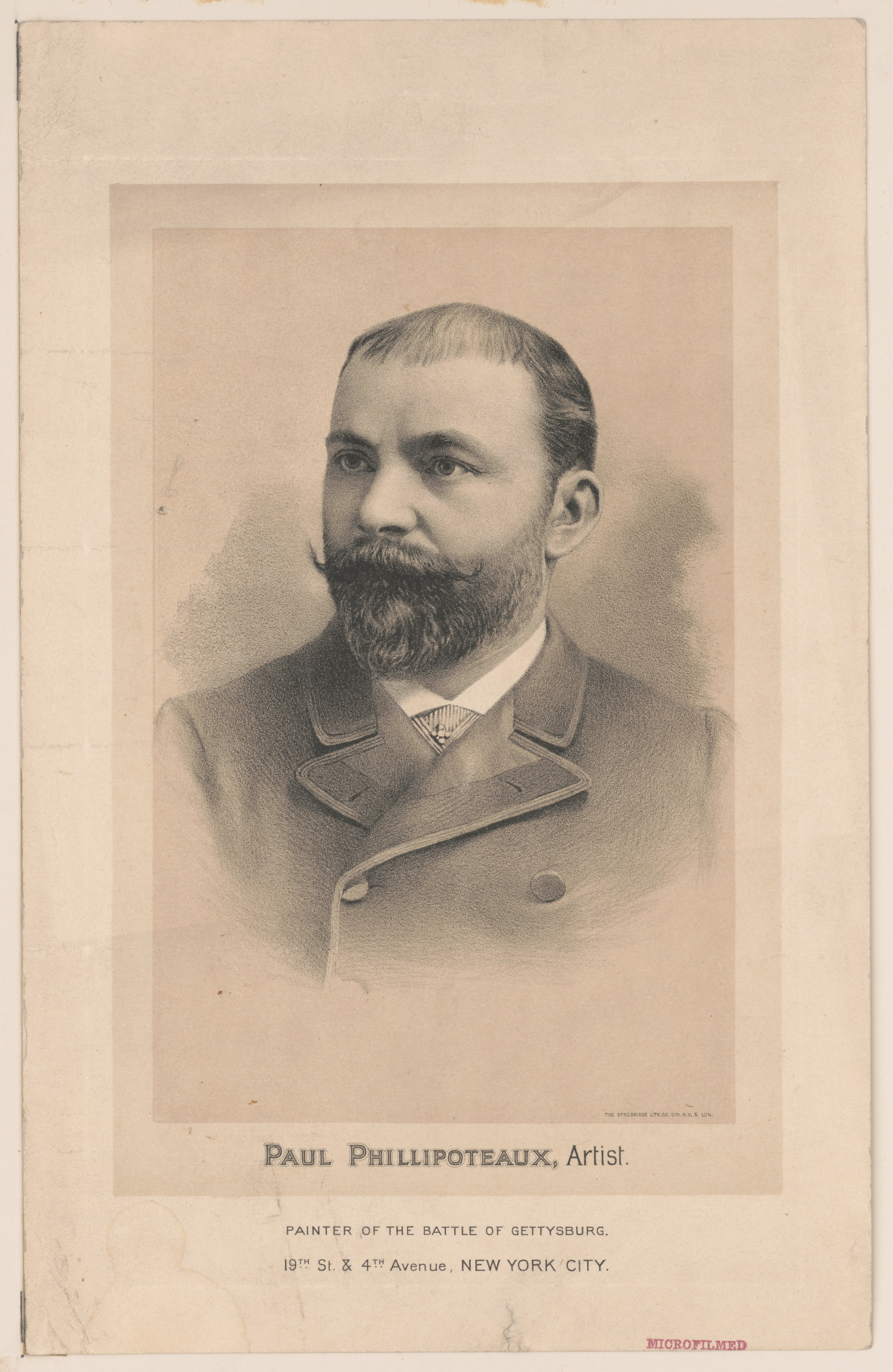
- Born: Paul Dominique Philippoteaux; 27 January 1846
- Died: 28 June 1923 (aged 77)

Paul Dominique Philippoteaux (27 January 1846 – 28 June 1923) was a French artist. He is best known for the Gettysburg Cyclorama, illustrating the Battle of Gettysburg.

== Life and career ==
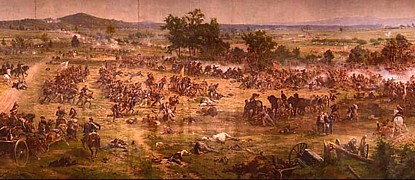
Section of The Battle of Gettysburg depicting Pickett's Charge up Cemetery Ridge

Paul Philippoteaux was born in Paris, the son of the French artist Henri Félix Emmanuel Philippoteaux. His education was at the Collège Henri-IV, the École des Beaux-Arts in Paris, and in the studio of his father, as well as the studios of Léon Cogniet and Alexandre Cabanel.

He became interested in cycloramas and in collaboration with his father created The Defence of the Fort d'Issy in 1871. Other works included Taking of Plevna (Turko-Russian War), the Passage of the Balkans, The Belgian Revolution of 1830, Attack in the Park, The Battle of Kars, The Battle of Tel-el-Kebir, and the Derniere Sortie.

Philippoteaux was commissioned by a group of Chicago investors in 1879 to create the Gettysburg Cyclorama. He spent several weeks in April 1882 at the site of the Gettysburg Battlefield to sketch and photograph the scene, and he extensively researched the battle and its events over several months. Local photographer William H. Tipton created a series of panoramic photographs shot from a wooden tower erected along present-day Hancock Avenue. The photos, pasted together, formed the basis of the composition. Philippoteaux also interviewed several survivors of the battle, including Union generals Winfield Scott Hancock, Abner Doubleday, Oliver Otis Howard, and Alexander S. Webb, and based his work partly on their recollections.

Philippoteaux enlisted a team of five assistants, including his father until his death, to create the final work. It took over a year and a half to complete. The finished painting was nearly 100 yards long and weighed six tons. When completed for display, the full work included not just the painting, but numerous artifacts and sculptures, including stone walls, trees, and fences. The effect of the painting has been likened to the nineteenth century equivalent of an IMAX theater. It was the largest painting on canvas until at least 1964.

His Cyclorama of Jerusalem was completed in Sainte-Anne-de-Beaupré, Quebec, Canada, in 1895.

Other paintings included Retour d'un pardon (1864), Vannenses (1865), Marche en Bretagne (1865), and Scene d'invasion (1866), which were all exhibited at the Paris Salon.

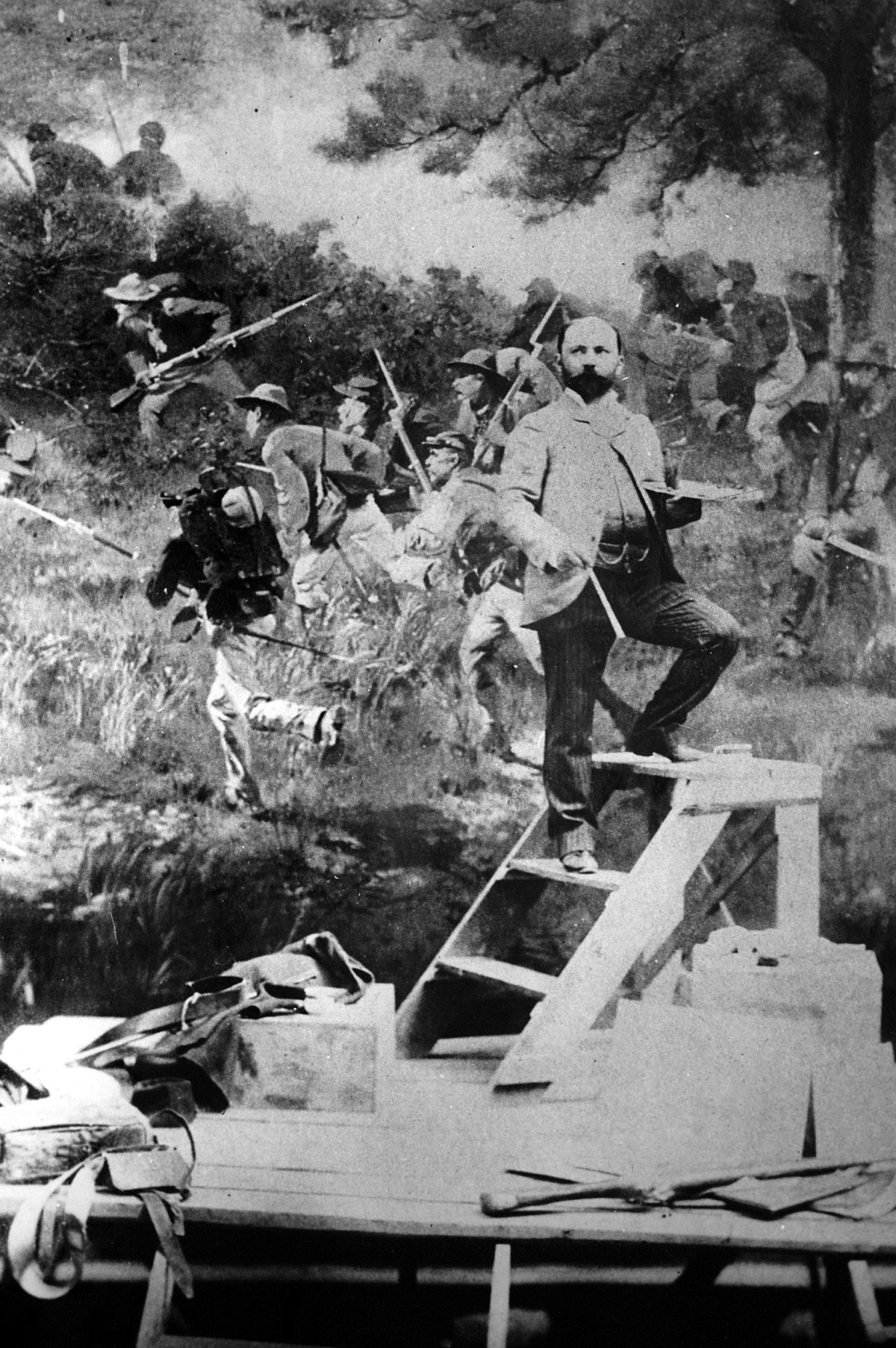
Philippoteaux painting the Gettysburg Cyclorama

Philippoteaux made drawings that were engraved by Charles Laplante (fr) to illustrate the 1877 first edition of Jules Verne's novel Hector Servadac (or Off on a Comet).
