= Honor Among Thieves (The Brandos album) =

Studio album by the Brandos
- Released: 1987
- Genre: Rock
- Label: Relativity
- Producer: Dave Kincaid

The Brandos chronology
| Honor Among Thieves (1987) | Gunfire at Midnight (1992) |

Honor Among Thieves is the debut album by the American band the Brandos, released in 1987. The first single was "Gettysburg", which was a minor hit on radio and MTV.

The album peaked at No. 108 on the Billboard 200. The band supported the album with a North American tour that included stints opening for INXS, the Georgia Satellites, and the Cars. Honor Among Thieves won a New York Music Award for the best independent debut of 1987.

== Production ==
Most of the album's songs were written by singer Dave Kincaid, who also produced. He strove to make the songs sound similar to each other. Kincaid's slide guitar playing was influenced by his love of the Allman Brothers Band's At Fillmore East. Honor Among Thieves was mixed at Power Station, in New York. "Strychnine" and "Walking on the Water" are covers of songs by, respectively, the Sonics and Creedence Clearwater Revival. "A Matter of Survival" is about domestic abuse. "Nothing to Lose" describes the possibility of death by murder.

== Critical reception ==
Professional ratings
Review scores
| Source | Rating |
|---|---|
| AllMusic | 4/5 stars |
| Chicago Tribune | 2.5/4 stars |
| The Philadelphia Inquirer | 3/4 stars |

Newsday deemed the title track "a threatening tune with an interesting hook and some chords borrowed from that Tom Petty-Stevie Nicks classic, 'Stop Dragging My Heart Around'." The New York Times determined that the Brandos "make sturdy, grim-spirited guitar-based rock in the mold of Creedence Clearwater Revival." The Chicago Tribune labeled the album "tough, muscular, guitar-oriented rock 'n' roll with a kind of haunted-souls feeling to the vocals and guitar lines."

The Washington Post wrote that "this New York quartet has studiously fashioned its Americana-drenched sound and image." The Boston Globe called Honor Among Thieves "an impressively rootsy album." The Philadelphia Inquirer noted that "the music is quirkily original: Big, punchy song ... that for the most part achieve their elaborate ambitions." Trouser Press opined that "though too much of the band's material lacks real distinction, Honor Among Thieves is a generally impressive debut." The Oregonian listed the album among the 10 best of 1987.

AllMusic wrote that "the Brandos play with great verve on this strong set of compositions."

== Track listing ==
| No. | Title | Writer(s) | Length |
|---|---|---|---|
| 1. | "Gettysburg" | Carl Funk, Dave Kincaid | 4:05 |
| 2. | "A Matter of Survival" | Funk, Kincaid | 3:33 |
| 3. | "Nothing to Fear" | Funk, Kincaid | 4:41 |
| 4. | "Honor Among Thieves" | Funk, Kincaid | 4:34 |
| 5. | "Strychnine" | Gerry Roslie | 2:40 |
| 6. | "Hard Luck Runner" | Funk, Kincaid, Ed Rupprecht | 3:46 |
| 7. | "In My Dreams" | Funk, Dave Dysart, Kincaid | 4:16 |
| 8. | "Walking on the Water" | John Fogerty | 4:52 |
| 9. | "Come Home" | Kincaid | 2:17 |

== Personnel ==
- Dave Kincaid – lead vocal, guitars
- Ed Rupprecht – guitars, harmonica
- Ernie Mendillo – bass, backing vocals
- Larry Mason – drums, backing vocals
- Joe Kernich – keyboards

Technical

- Dave Kincaid – producer, arrangements
- Greg Calbi – mastering
- Matthew "Boomer" La Monica – engineer (assistant)
- Roy Hendrickson – engineer (assistant)
- Mick Rock – photographer
- Jon Goldberger – mixing (tracks 5 and 9)
- Steven Rinkoff – mixing
- Don Sternecker – recording
- David Bett – design
