= Dave Kincaid =

American musician (born 1957)

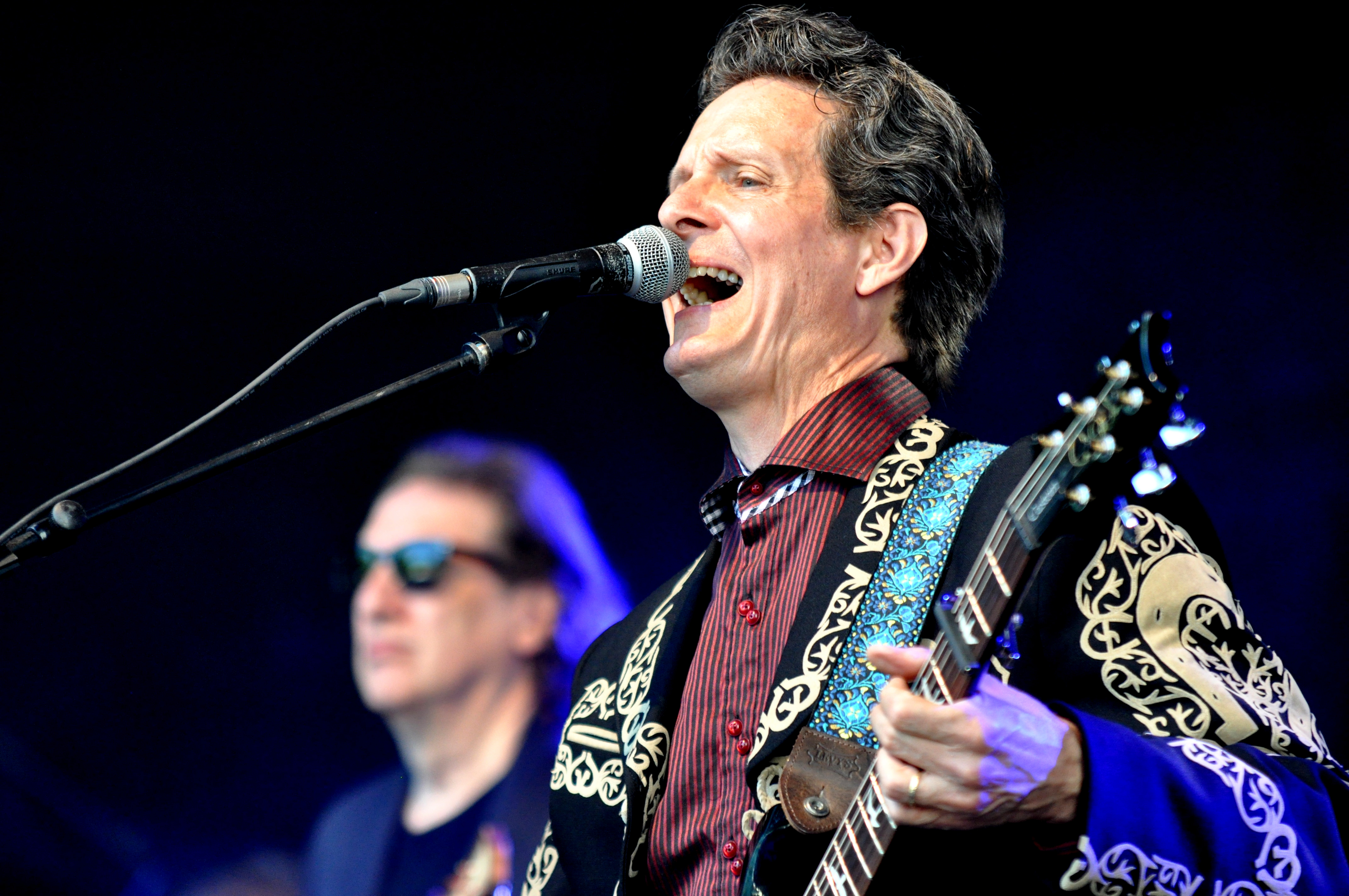
- Dave Kincaid performing with The Brandos 2017 at Blacksheep Festival, Germany

Background information
- Born: March 21, 1957 (age 69)
- Genres: Roots rock Rock; Irish Music
- Occupations: Musician, producer, songwriter
- Instrument: Guitarist
- Labels: Relativity; Geffen Records; RCA; SPV GmbH; Blue Rose; Rykodisc

David "Dave" Kincaid (born March 21, 1957) is an American musician who co-founded the Seattle band The Allies, and the New York band The Brandos with Ernie Mendillo in 1985. Besides playing with The Brandos, Kincaid has also released two albums of Irish music under the name David Kincaid.

As a musician he has worked with Scott Kempner, Dennis Diken, Simon Kirke, John Whelan, Jerry O'Sullivan and Liz Knowles.

== Discography ==
- The Irish Volunteer - 1998
- The Irish-American's Song - 2001
