= Gettysburg National Museum =

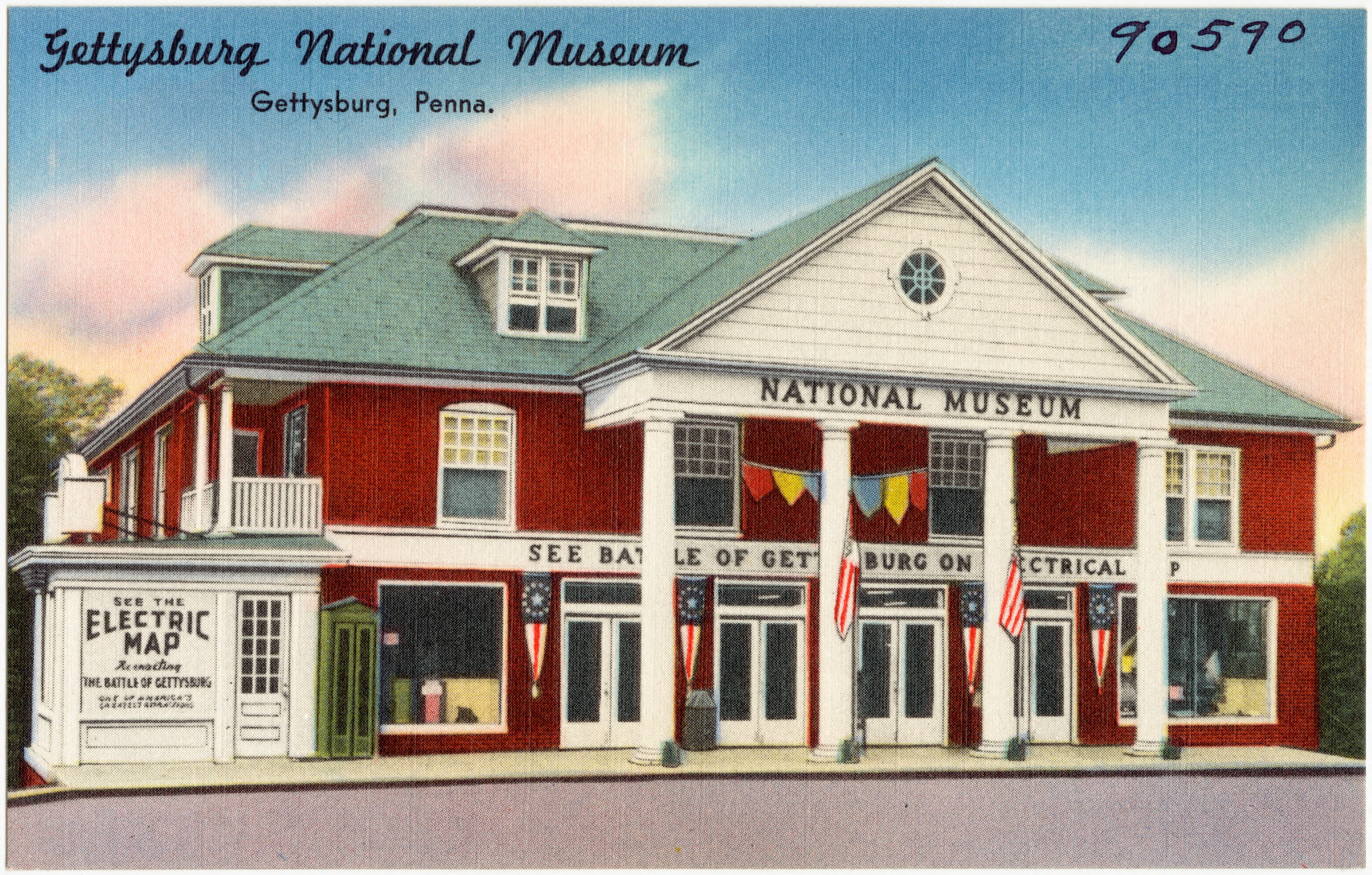
- Former name: National Museum
- Established: 1921
- Dissolved: 2011 (new location built)
- Location: Gettysburg, Pennsylvania
- Coordinates: 39°49′3.78″N 77°13′58.92″W
- Type: History museum
- Collections: Transferred to new Gettysburg Museum and Visitor Center
- Collection size: 89,246 pieces
- Founder: John Rosensteel
- Owner: National Park Service

The Gettysburg National Museum was a Gettysburg Battlefield visitor attraction on the south border of the Gettysburg borough. Established by George D. Rosensteel after working at his uncle's 1888 Round Top Museum, the facility had an interpretive Battle of Gettysburg map using incandescent lights and was acquired by the National Park Service for use as the 1974–2008 Gettysburg National Military Park museum and visitor center after the Cyclorama Building at Gettysburg and before the Gettysburg Museum and Visitor Center.

== History ==
In 1929, Dr. William J. Chewning, having amassed over 100,000 Civil War artifacts, opened The National Battlefield Museum in Fredericksburg, Virginia. This private museum operated under his direction from 1929 until his death in 1937. In his final years, Chewning tried to find a local buyer for the collection, but neither the National Park Service nor the City of Fredericksburg opted to purchase the artifacts. With his passing, Chewning's widow and son inherited the collection. They, however, did find a buyer. The April 30, 1938 edition of The Free Lance-Star carried an editorial entitled "Fredericksburg Loses." The column announced the sale of the Chewning Collection to a buyer in Manassas, Virginia. The local paper lifted this editorial from The Suffolk News-Herald. In announcing the sale, the editor mourned Fredericksburg's loss of the collection.

The master collection belonged in Fredericksburg and there it should have remained. These relics will be of immense value historically and intrinsically no matter where they are but they will fit nowhere like in the place of their origin. We have no hesitancy in saying that this collection should be acquired by the Federal government and made more accessible to the public. It is in many respects educational. Fredericksburg has lost a rare chance to capitalize it along with its sacred shrines. But that city's loss is Manassas' gain. The place that gets it has something.

Just as Dr. Chewning had not wanted to see the collection leave Fredericksburg, neither did his family. With no local buyers, however, keeping the collection in the community proved impossible. Julius T. Richards of Manassas, Virginia became the new owner of the massive collection. In announcing the transaction, The Fauquier Democrat described the disappointment the Chewnings felt in selling the artifacts out of Fredericksburg:

In announcing the sale Mr. Chewning stated that both he and his mother, Mrs. Anne Page Chewning, regretted the necessity of depriving Fredericksburg of this rare collection. No prospective purchasers who would keep the museum in Fredericksburg could be located. Mr. Chewning added that Fredericksburg had made no attempt to acquire the collection and, in fact, 'had evidenced little real interest in it.' For these reasons, he said, he and Mrs. Chewning deemed it advisable to accept Mr. Richards' 'highly attractive proposition. Mrs. Chewning said that while she regrets the removal of the collection from Fredericksburg, she is 'happy to know' that it will be permanently in Virginia.

=== Collection transfers ===
Florida native Julius T. Richards was a commission merchant in Washington, D.C. A Marine Corps veteran of World War One, Richards also collected Civil War artifacts. He added the Chewning artifacts to his own collection and built a $20,000 museum on the Manassas battlefield to display the relics. An additional $3,000 went into the exhibits that covered 180 square feet (17 m^{2}) of wall space. The museum stood along Lee Highway (State Route 29) to the east of the famous Stone Bridge along Bull Run. Richards retained the name The National Battlefield Museum and opened his business on May 8, 1938. Unfortunately for Richards, hopes for a thriving tourism business proved fleeting.

World War Two greatly affected tourism to the battlefield and Richards ultimately put the collection into storage. The end of the war brought its own concerns for the museum. Construction of the National Park Service museum and administrative building at Manassas in 1945 created competition for Richards. Hoping to find a more suitable location, he took his collection and moved it to another Civil War site. Whereas the Chewnings always fretted about keeping the collection close to its origin, Richards opted to move it out of Virginia.

Vicksburg, Mississippi proved to be the new home for The National Battlefield Museum. Vicksburg's role in the Civil War, Richards admitted, made it a natural location for his business. The museum sat at 4005 Washington Street and the local newspaper referred to it as "a mecca for tourists." The centerpiece of the collection remained the Stonewall Jackson amputation table. Mrs. Richards later stated that the collection's storage during the war dealt a blow to the collection's provenance. "During its storage," she claimed, "many of the papers were lost, destroyed or stolen, including a complete file on each item and its description and identity." Nonetheless, The Vicksburg Sunday Post Herald reported that Richards "can provide an interesting story about almost every object." It's possible that Richards sold some of the collection around this time, as the paper reported the museum contained 60,000 relics, whereas it had been reported that he obtained 100,000 artifacts from the Chewnings. Regardless of its size, the museum remained in Vicksburg for about seven years before Richards once again hit the road.

The collection's destination after Vicksburg remains a little uncertain. California newspaper announcements from 1957 indicate that Richards intended to reopen the museum in Santa Cruz. A brochure exists for The National Civil War Museum of Santa Cruz that lists Richards as the owner. However, a 1961 Florida newspaper article about Richards states that he moved the collection to that state in 1957. Perhaps Richards intended to open the museum in Santa Cruz, but never quite made the move. Maybe he did go to California only to immediately turn around and take the collection to Florida. Either way, by 1960 the National Civil War Museum sat along the Suwannee River in Old Town, Florida. As the years advanced, Richards and his wife took less and less interest in the collection. Richard suffered a heart attack and he and his wife contemplated the future of the museum and its contents. A waning interest in the artifacts, coupled with ailing health, the Richards decided to sell the collection.

=== Arrival in Gettysburg ===
On December 12, 1960, the Richards's wrote a letter to entertainer and television personality Cliff Arquette. Known for his comedic character "Charley Weaver," Arquette also pursued a strong interest in Civil War history. He combined those interests in 1959 when he opened Cliff Arquette's Soldiers Museum (later Charley Weaver's American Museum of the Civil War) in Gettysburg. The museum stood along Baltimore Street on Cemetery Hill and displayed Civil War dioramas and figurines created by Arquette. The notion of buying such a large collection of artifacts that the Richards's offered for sale did not appeal to Arquette. He instead passed the letter on to his friend, George D. Rosensteel, IV of Gettysburg's National Museum.

The Rosensteel family began collecting artifacts associated with the Battle of Gettysburg almost as soon as the smoke cleared from the battlefield. In 1921, George D. Rosensteel, IV opened the Gettysburg National Museum along Taneytown Road, directly across from the Gettysburg National Cemetery. He actively tracked down artifacts related to the battle and the Civil War and built for himself an impressive collection. The Richards's asked $60,000 for their collection, but George appears to have been quite a negotiator as he was able to talk the Richards's down in price. On June 15, 1961, the Richards's sold the contents of their museum, which numbered 60,000 items, to the Gettysburg National Museum, Inc. for $30,000 – half the asking price.

== National Park Service era ==
The Rosensteels maintained their museum for another ten years following the purchase from Richards, but in 1971 the family that had been collecting Civil War artifacts for over a century chose to sell. The new steward was the National Park Service in 1967. Over 89,000 artifacts and the museum building passed into the hands of the government. The Jacobs-Agan-Chewning-Richards-Rosensteel Collection makes up the bulk of the National Park Service artifacts preserved and on display today. The building was expanded numerous times to accommodate increases in tourists (e.g., an auditorium for the electric map).
