= Pat Murphy of Meagher's Brigade =

"Pat Murphy Of Meagher's Brigade", also known as "Pat Murphy Of The Irish Brigade" or "Song Of The Splintered Shillelagah", is a song that comes from the American Civil War. The song tells the story of a "Patrick Murphy" who serves under the command of Brig. Gen. Thomas Francis Meagher in the Irish Brigade of the Union Army. Murphy serves to illustrate the plight of the Irish in the Civil War.

== Lyrics ==
'Twas the night before battle and, gathered in groups,
The soldiers lay close at their quarters,
A-thinking, no doubt, of their loved ones at home
Of mothers, wives, sweethearts and daughters.

With a pipe in his mouth sat a handsome young blade,
And a song he was singing so gaily,
His name was Pat Murphy of Meagher's Brigade
And he sang of the land of Shillelagh.

Said Pat to his comrades, it looks quare to see
Brothers fighting in such a strange manner;
But I'll fight 'til I die, If I never get killed
For America's bright starry banner.

Far away in the west rode a dashing young blade
And the song he was singing so gaily,
'Twas honest Pat Murphy of the Irish Brigade
And the song of the splintered shillelagh.

Well, morning soon broke and poor Paddy awoke
He found rebels to give satisfaction
And the drummer was beating the Devil's sad tune
They were calling the troops into action.

Far away in the west rode a dashing young blade
And the song he was singing so gaily,
'Twas honest Pat Murphy of the Irish Brigade
And the song of the splintered shillelagh.

Then the Irish Brigade into battle was seen,
Their blood for the cause shedding freely
With their bayonet charges they rushed on the foe
With a shout for the land of shillelagh.

Far away in the west rode a dashing young blade
And the song he was singing so gaily,
'Twas honest Pat Murphy of the Irish Brigade
And the song of the splintered shillelagh.

The day after battle, the dead lay in heaps
And Paddy lay bleeding and gory,
With a hole in his breast where some enemy's ball
Had ended his passion for glory,

No more in the camps will his letters be read
Nor his voice be heard singing so gaily
For he died far away from the friends that he loved
And far from the land of shillelagh.

Other lyrics include-

Then, surely, Columbia can never forget,
While valor and fame hold communion,
How nobly the brave Irish Volunteers fought,
In defense of the flag of our Union:
And, if ever Old Ireland for freedom should strike,
We'll a helping hand offer quite freely:
And the Stars and the Stripes shall be seen alongside,
Of the Flag of the Land of Shillaly!
