= Ernie Mendillo =

American musician (born 1959)

- Born: October 23, 1959 (age 66)
- Genres: Roots rock Rock
- Occupation: Musician
- Instrument: Bassist
- Labels: Relativity; Geffen Records; RCA; SPV GmbH; Blue Rose
- Member of: The Brandos, Bombaj Štampa, Dion DiMucci

Ernie Mendillo (born October 23, 1959) is an American musician who co-founded the New York band The Brandos with Dave Kincaid in 1985. He left the band in 2015. Besides playing with The Brandos, Mendillo was also a member of the Sarajevo rock band Bombaj Štampa. He is currently a member of HELP! A Beatles Tribute, performing concerts throughout Europe.

As a musician he has worked with Dion DiMucci, Scott Kempner, Dennis Diken, Simon Kirke, Branko Đurić and Pero Lovšin.
