= Gettysburg Museum and Visitor Center =

Museum in Pennsylvania, US

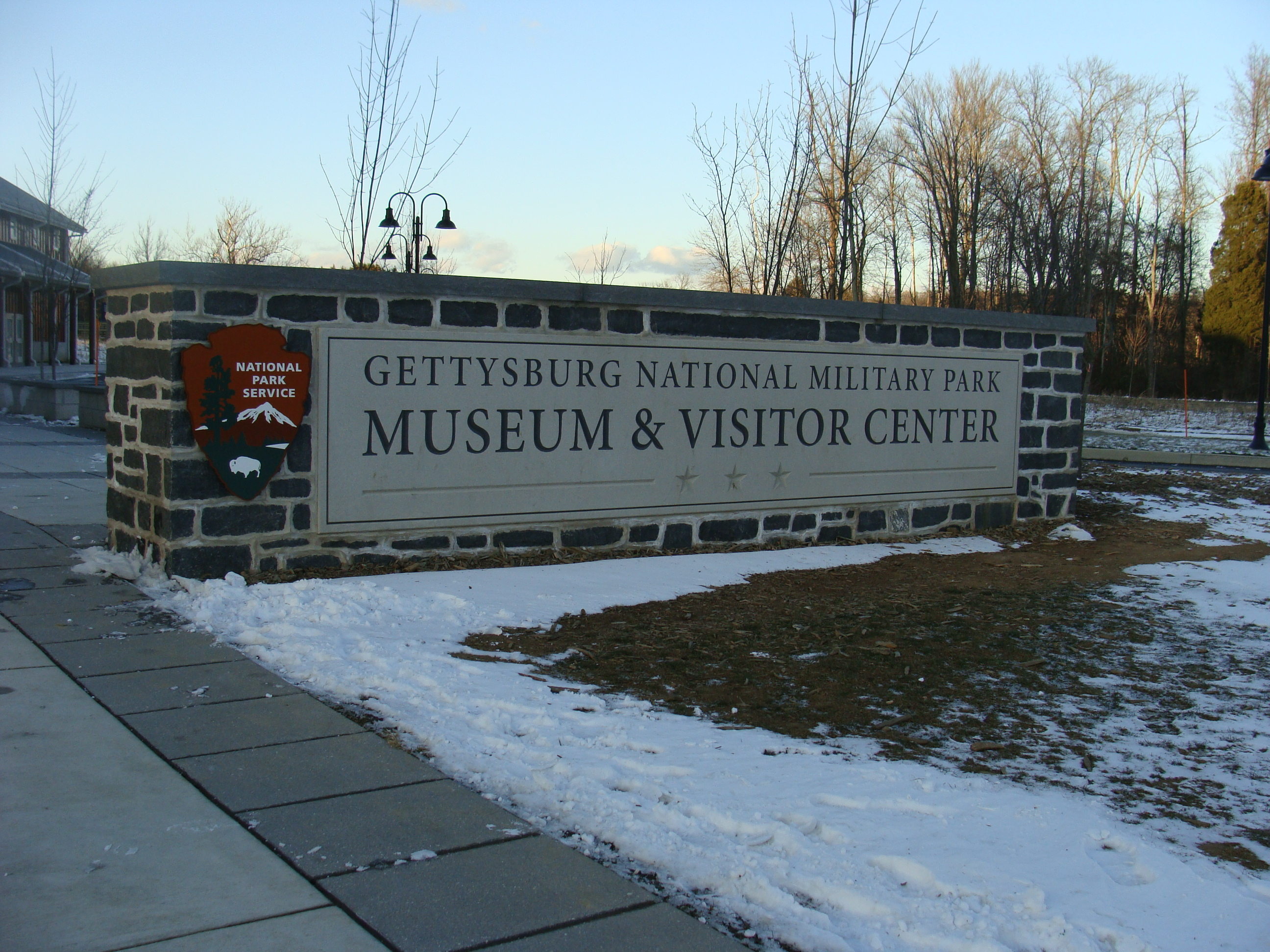
- Sign near main doorway

- Location of Museum
- Established: April 2008
- Location: Gettysburg NMP, Adams County, Pennsylvania, United States
- Coordinates: 39°48′41″N 77°13′33″W
- Visitors: 2 million
- Founder: Gettysburg Foundation
- Owner: National Park Service
- Public transit access: Gettysburg National Military Park, rabbittransit
- Parking: Entrances from Baltimore Pike
- Website: www.nps.gov/gett/planyourvisit/visitorcenters.htm

The Gettysburg Museum and Visitor Center is a Gettysburg National Military Park facility, with a museum about the American Civil War, the 1884 Gettysburg Cyclorama, and the tour center for licensed Battlefield Guides and for buses to see the Gettysburg Battlefield and Eisenhower National Historic Site.

The museum displays artifacts, including cannon, firearms, and uniforms, and includes an exhibit gallery and theater. Additional facilities are a "computer resource room", a bookstore with gifts, and a restaurant.

== History ==
One of the first Gettysburg museums displayed the J Albertus Danner collection of artifacts in 1881. In 1894 the Gettysburg Cyclorama was displayed in a tent at The Angle Groundbreaking for a building on Cemetery Hill occurred in 1912.

The 1888–1964 Round Top Museum and the 1921–2008 Gettysburg National Museum were both acquired by the National Park Service after the 1963 battle anniversary. During the post-WWII increase of tourism, Mission 66 improvements for the NPS 50th anniversary included the construction of the modernist Cyclorama Building at Gettysburg, designed by Richard Neutra, as the first NPS visitor center for the battlefield. It opened in 1962. Plans in 1973 for a projected tourist increase included an Oak Ridge visitor center and an Eisenhower Parkway on the west. Neither was built nor was an Appalachian Trail spur to the battlefield considered in 1982.

The Gettysburg National Museum became the visitor center in 1974. There were technology and sewer improvements in 1995. The building was demolished in 2008 after the new Gettysburg Museum and Visitor Center was completed. The new building now displays the restored Gettysburg Cyclorama. The landmark 1962 Cyclorama Building by Neutra was demolished in February 2013.

== Images ==
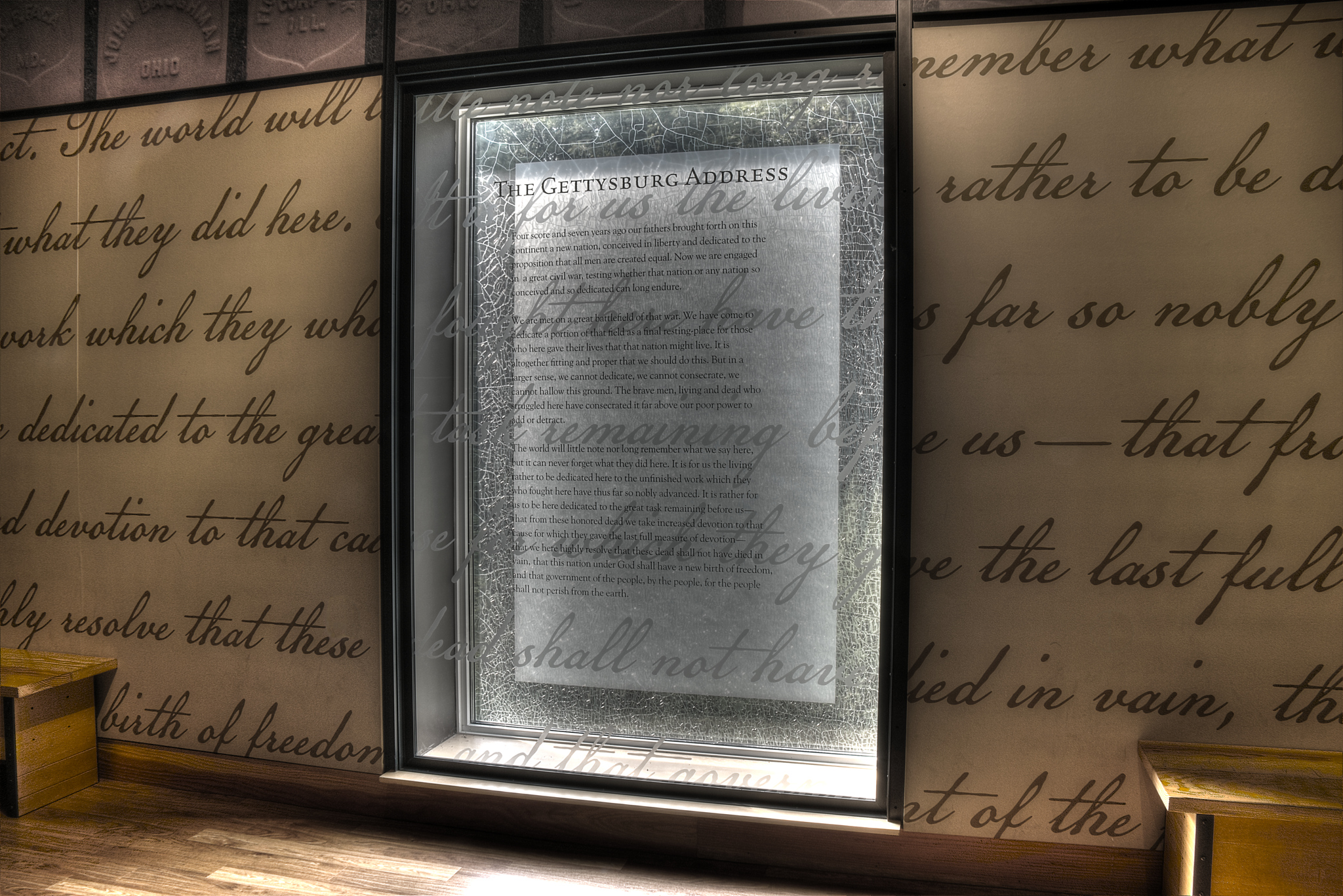
Display of the Gettysburg Address

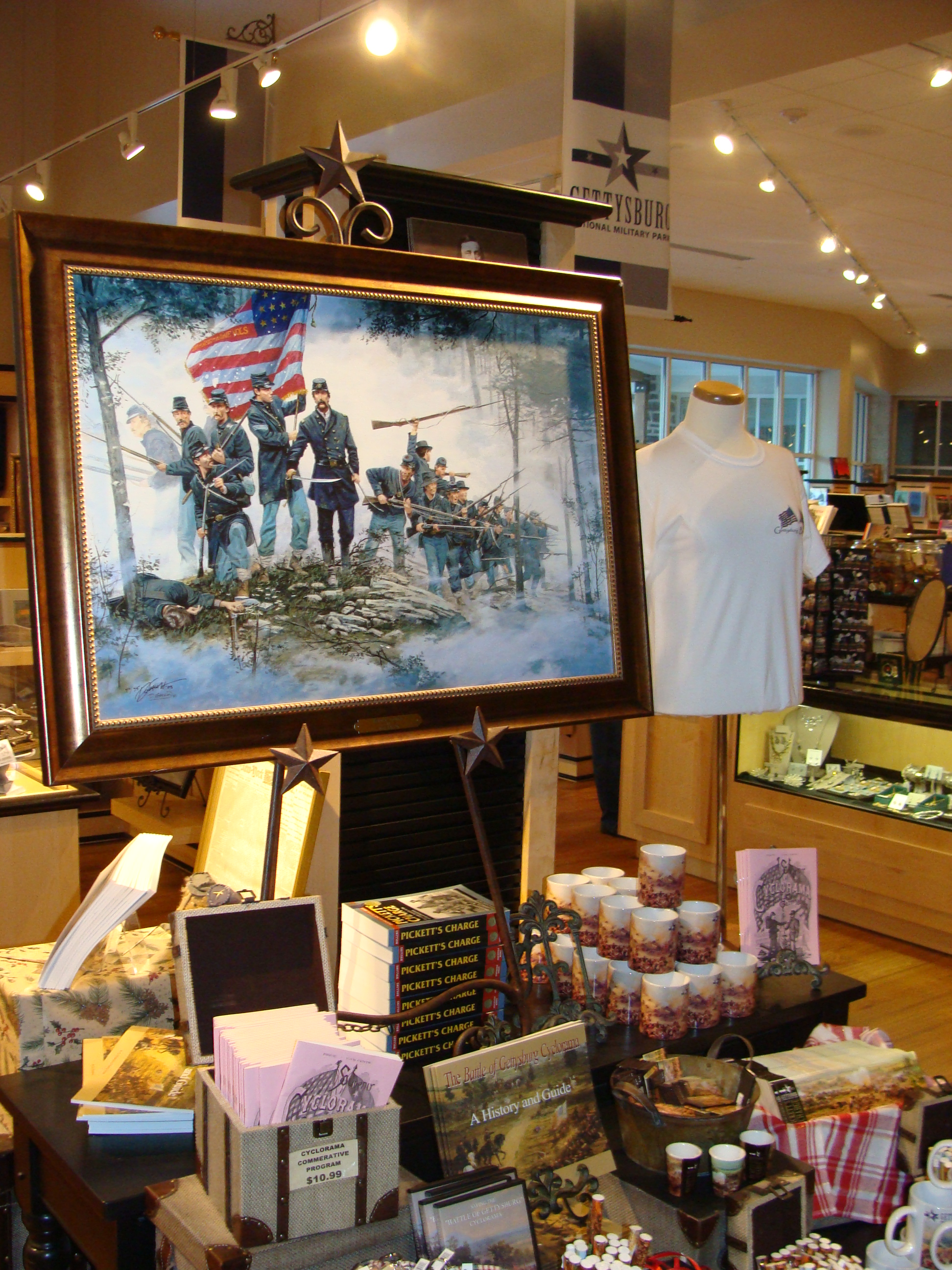
Displays in the new gift shop.
