= Gettysburg Cyclorama =

Cyclorama painting by Paul Philippoteaux

The Battle of Gettysburg (detail)
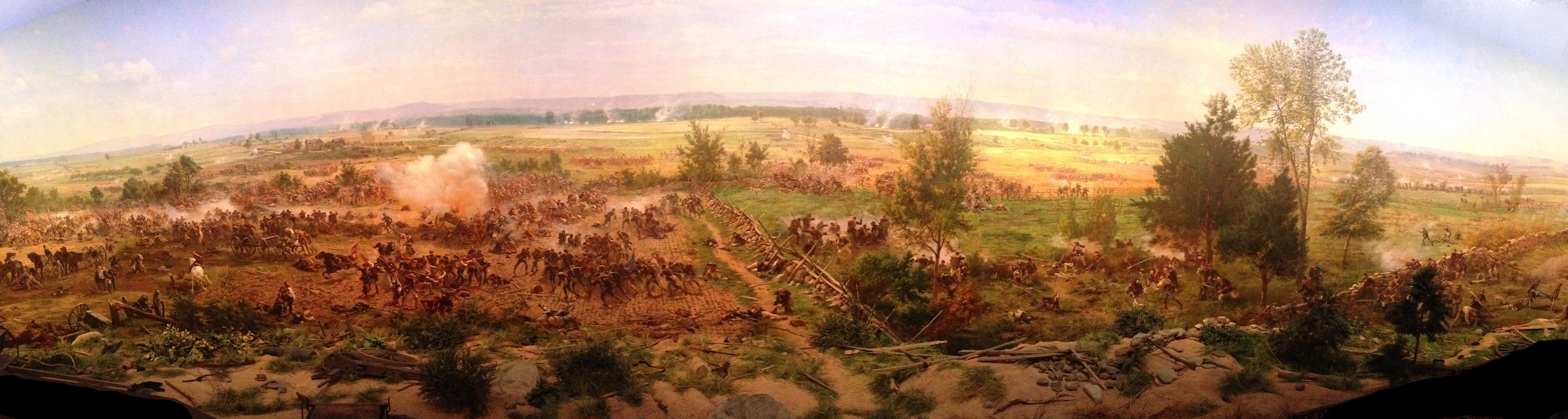
- Artist: Paul Philippoteaux
- Year: 1883
- Medium: Oil on canvas
- Dimensions: 13 m × 115 m (42 ft × 377 ft)
- Location: Museum and Visitor Center, Gettysburg National Military Park, Gettysburg, Pennsylvania; 39°48′41″N 77°13′33″W

The Battle of Gettysburg, also known as the Gettysburg Cyclorama, is a cyclorama painting by the French artist Paul Philippoteaux depicting Pickett's Charge, the climactic Confederate attack on the Union forces during the Battle of Gettysburg on July 3, 1863. After being commissioned by Chicago investors, Philippoteaux studied the battlefield and interviewed participants, completing the cyclorama in 1883. A Boston version of the cyclorama was later made, as well as two other major copies. After being displayed in several other locations in whole and in part, the Boston version was taken to Gettysburg, Pennsylvania, and was displayed there beginning in the 1910s. In 1942, it was purchased by the National Park Service. The cyclorama has been restored multiple times and is on display at Gettysburg National Military Park.

== Description ==
The painting is the work of French artist Paul Dominique Philippoteaux. It depicts Pickett's Charge, the failed infantry assault that was the climax of the Battle of Gettysburg. The painting is a cyclorama, a type of 360° cylindrical painting. The intended effect is to immerse the viewer in the scene being depicted, often with the addition of foreground models and life-sized replicas to enhance the illusion. Among the sites documented in the painting are Cemetery Ridge, the Angle, and the "High-water mark of the Confederacy". The version that hangs in Gettysburg, a recent (2005) restoration of the version created for Boston, is 42 feet (13 m) high and 377 feet (115 m) in circumference.

=== Details of the painting ===
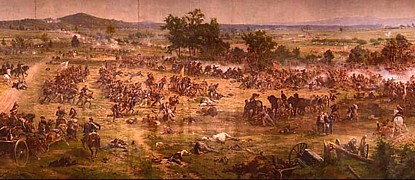
Pickett's Charge up Cemetery Ridge.

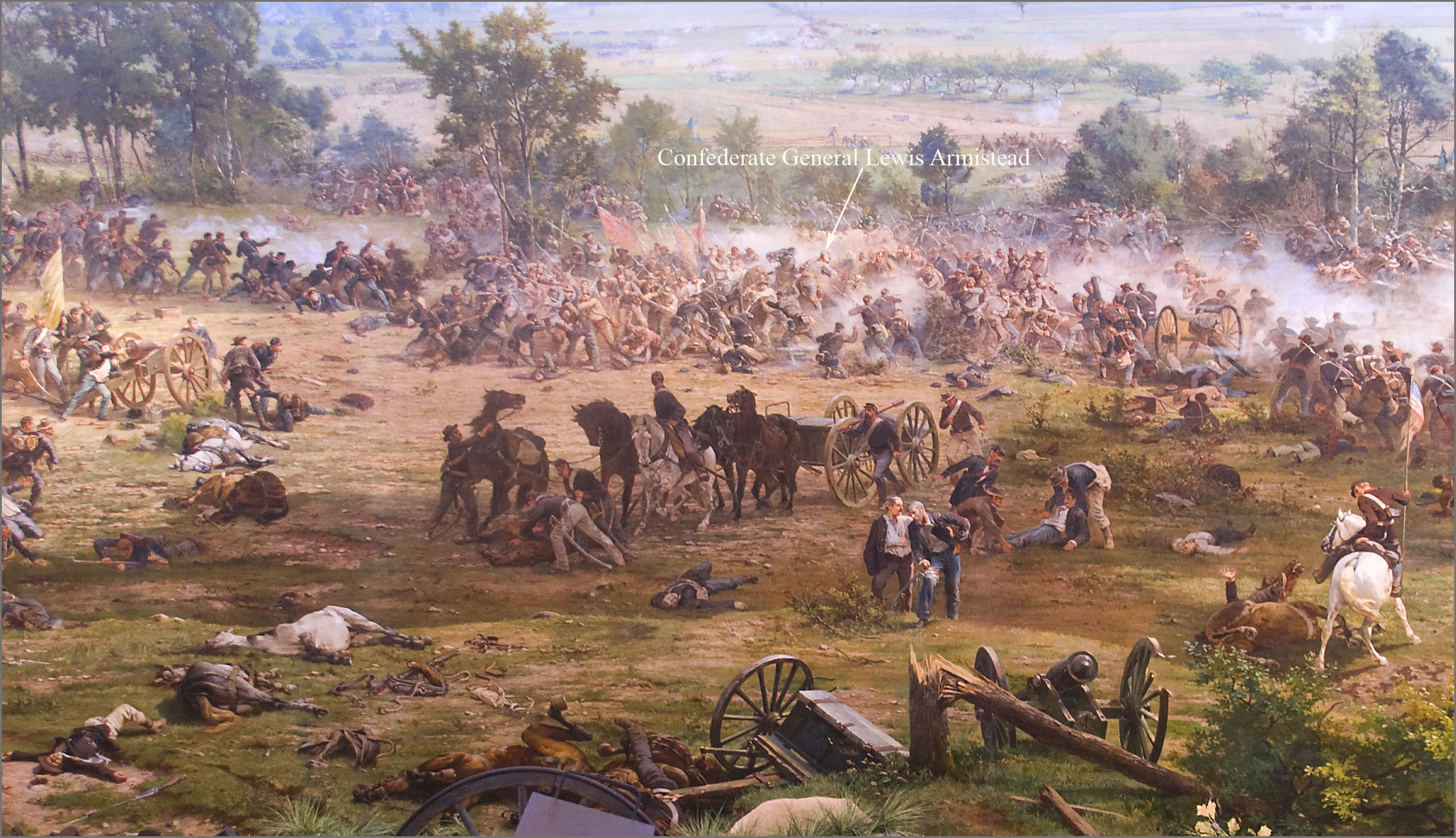
Confederate General Lewis Armistead at The Angle (Note: an artist's mistake, as Armistead was not on horseback and ran the last yards with his sword over his head holding his hat on its tip.) He was shot three times, and died, probably of sepsis, two days later in a Union field hospital.

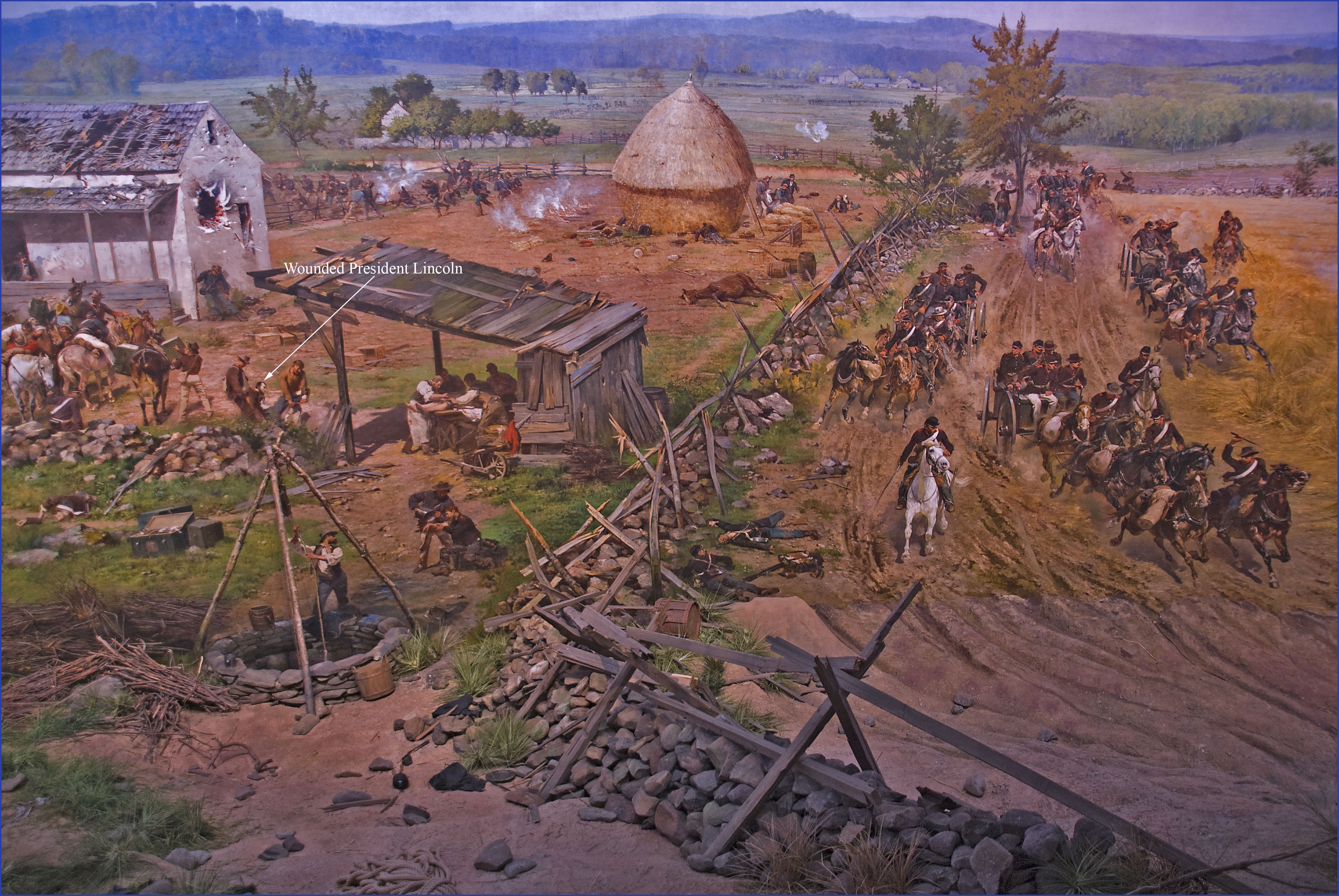
A wounded President Lincoln, reportedly according to Philippoteaux, representative of a wounded nation

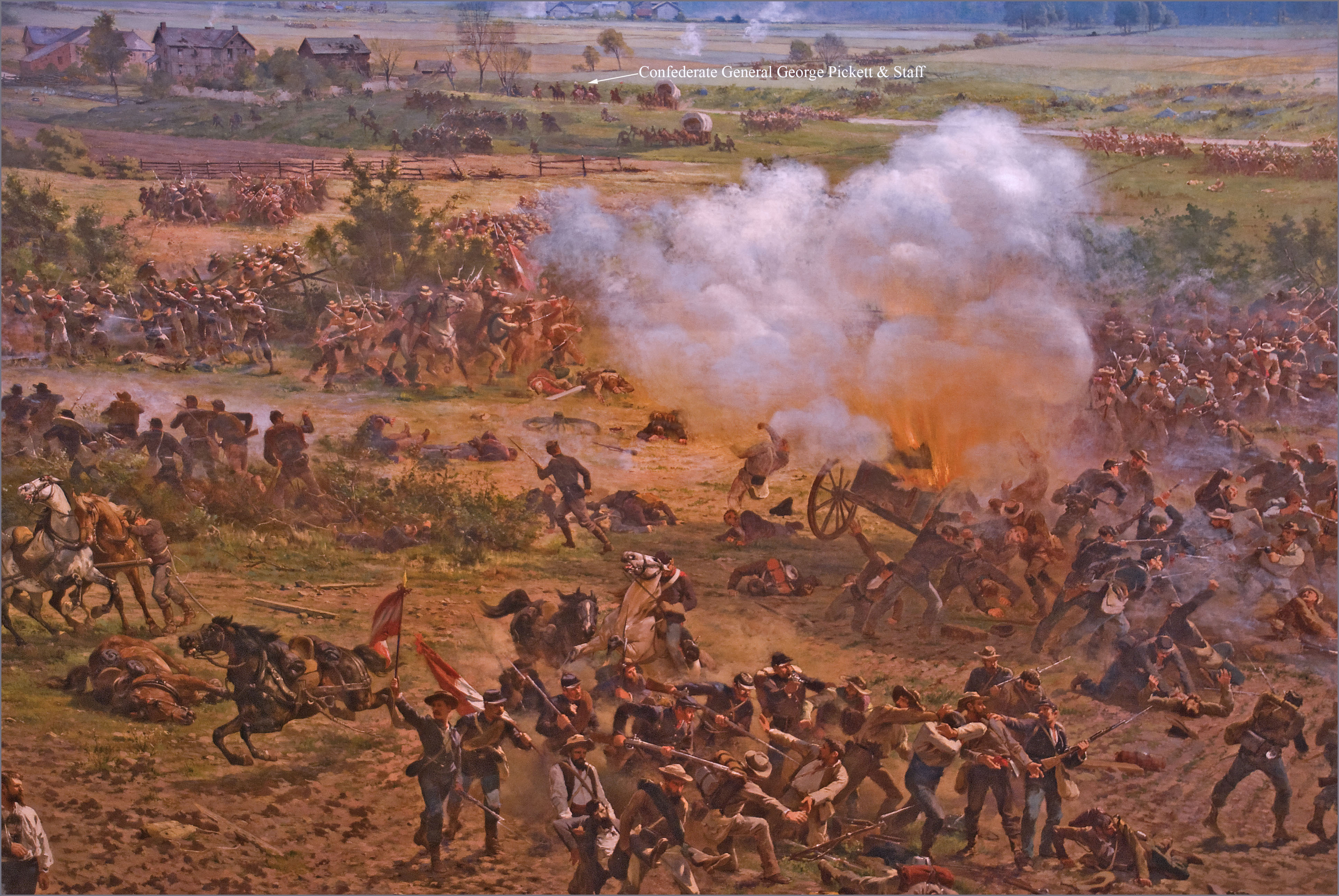
Caisson exploding

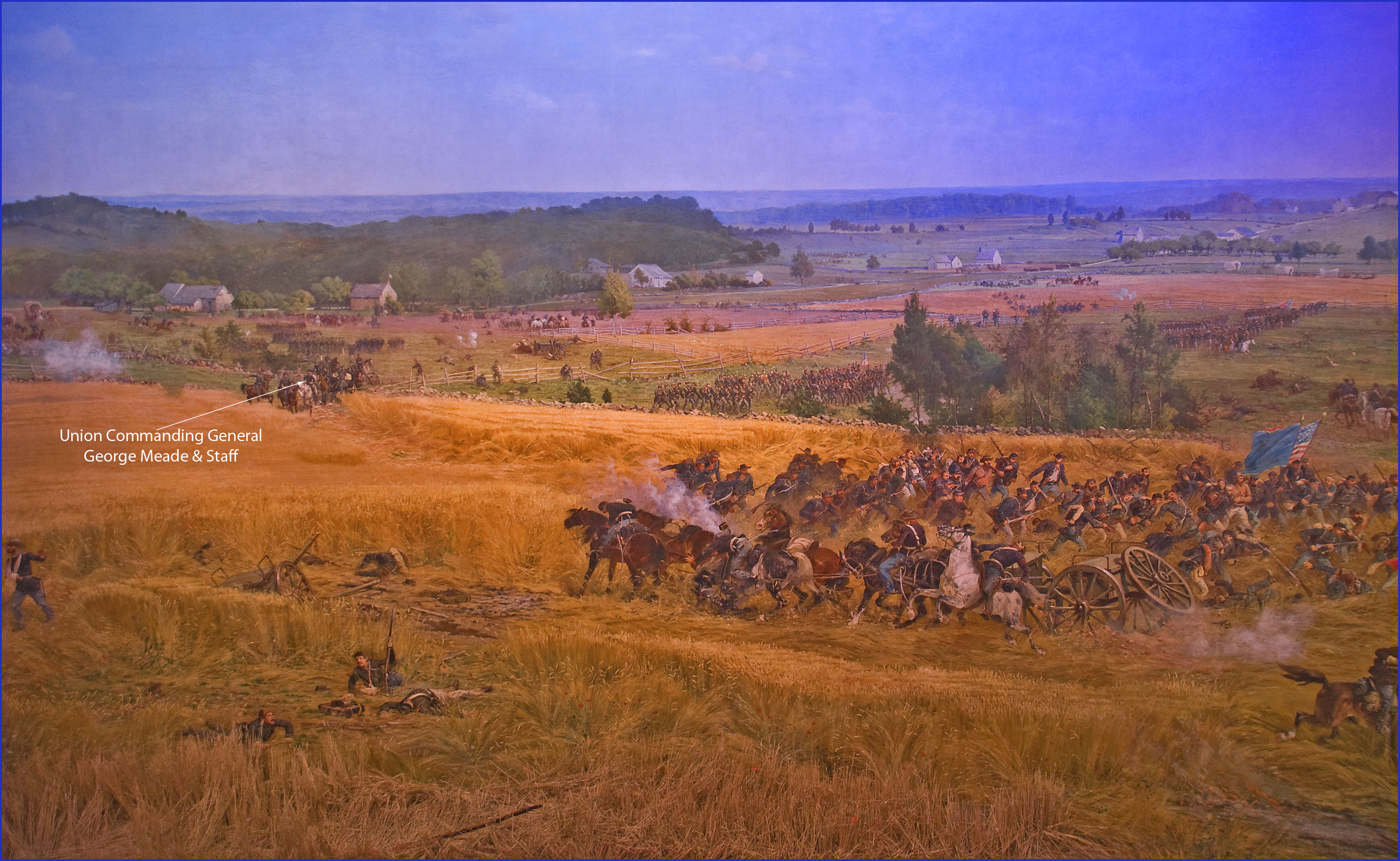
General George Meade and staff advancing toward Cemetery Ridge

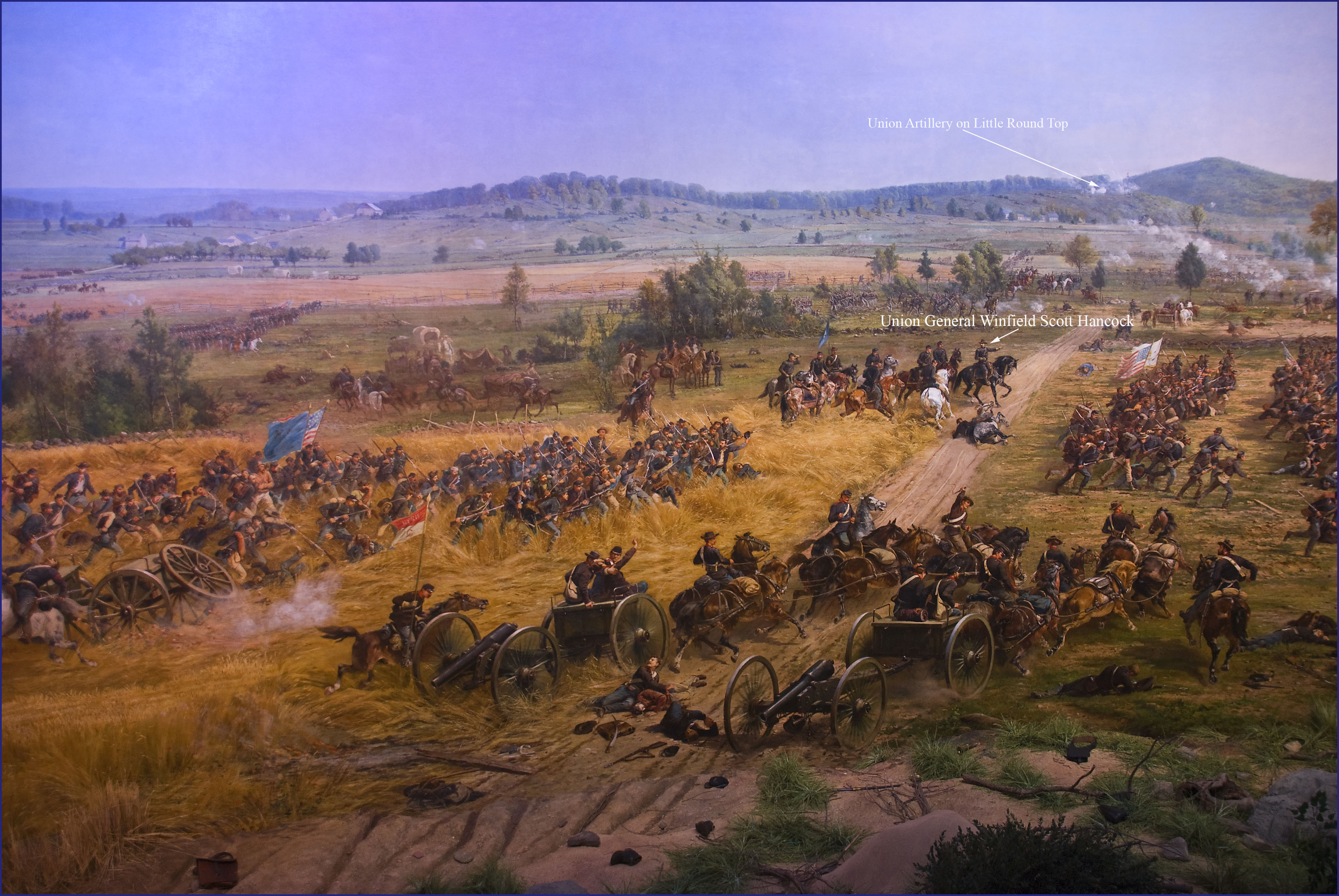
General Winfield Scott Hancock

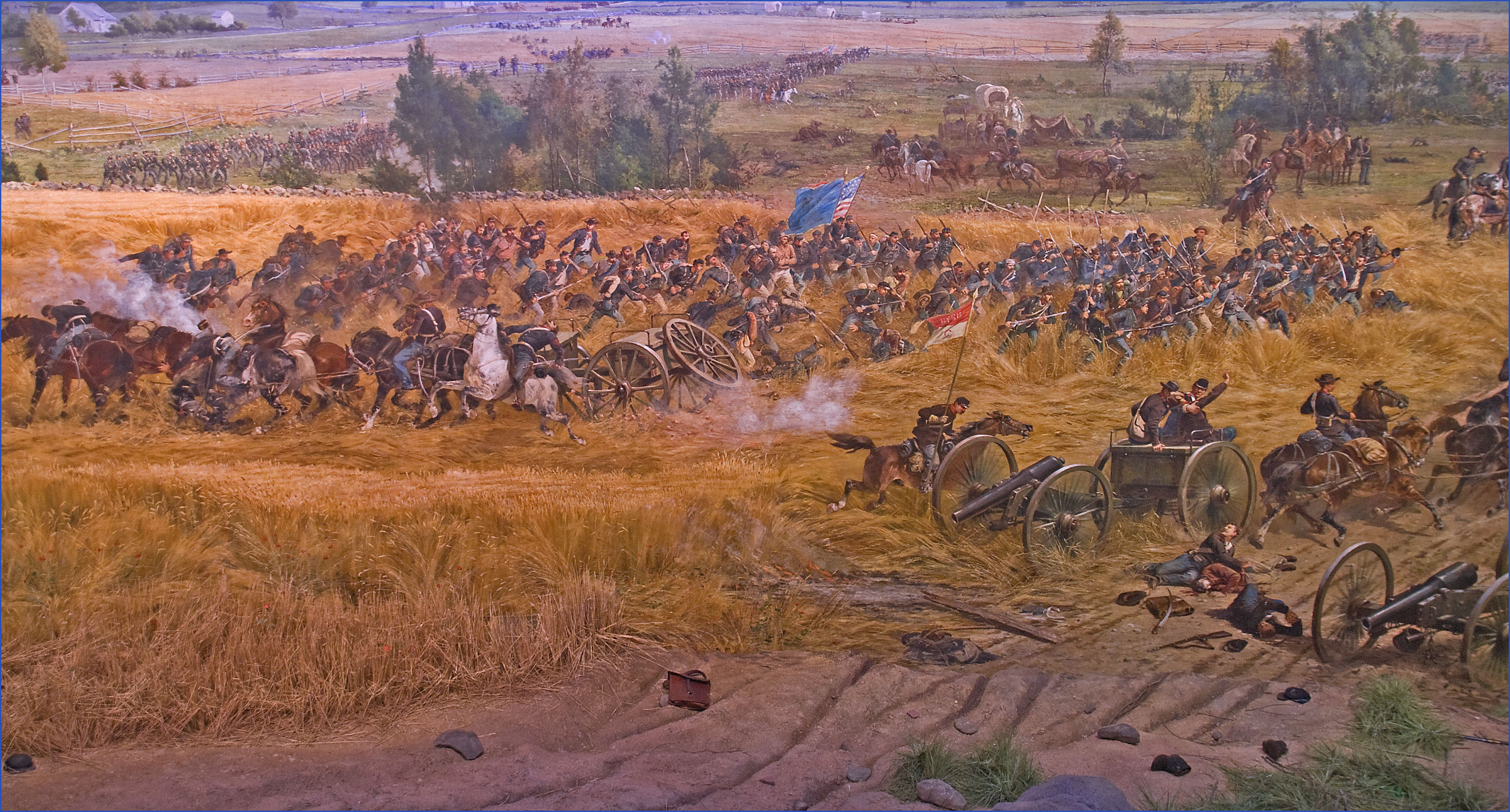
Union infantry and artillery advancing Toward The Angle

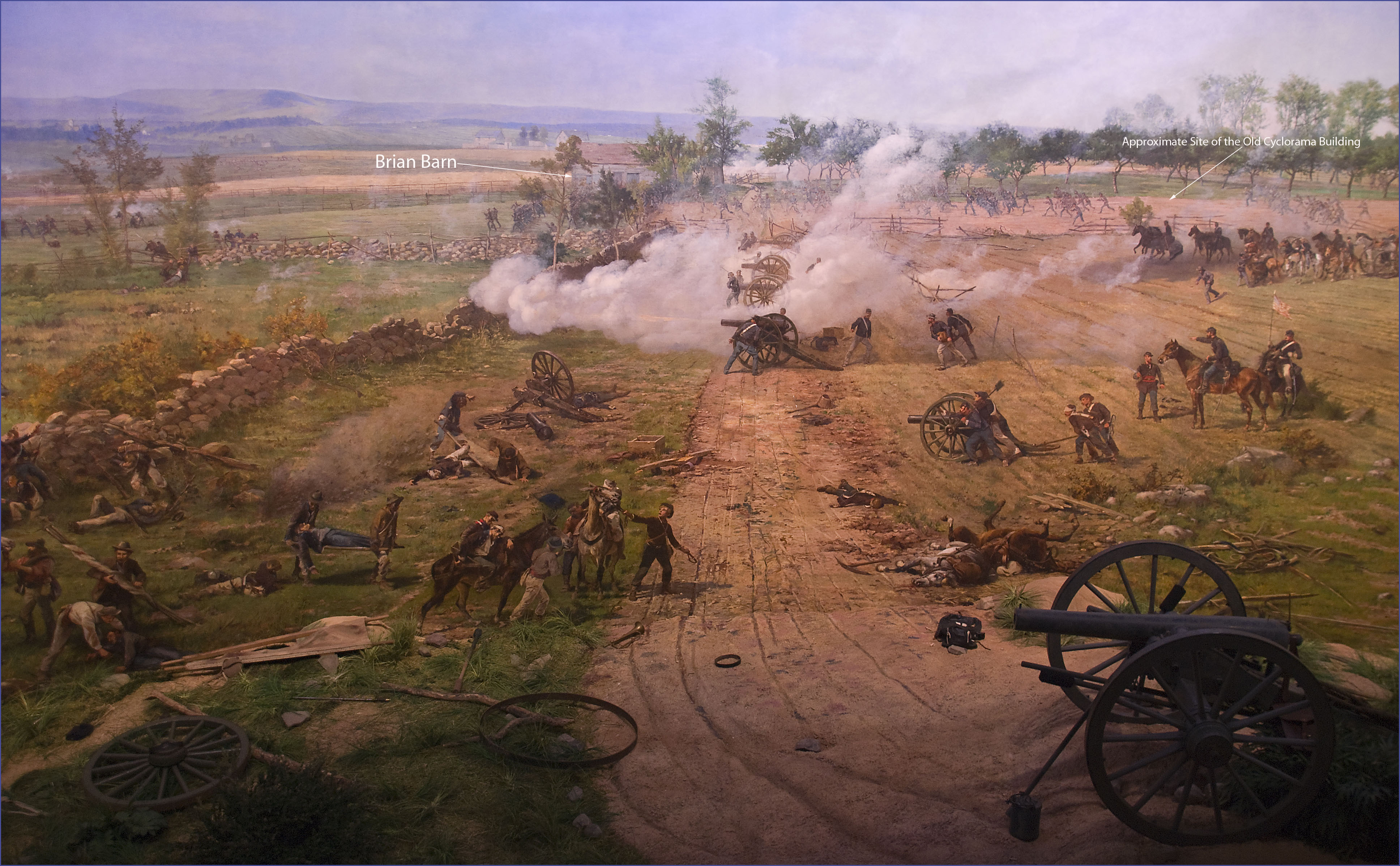
Union Line on Cemetery Ridge

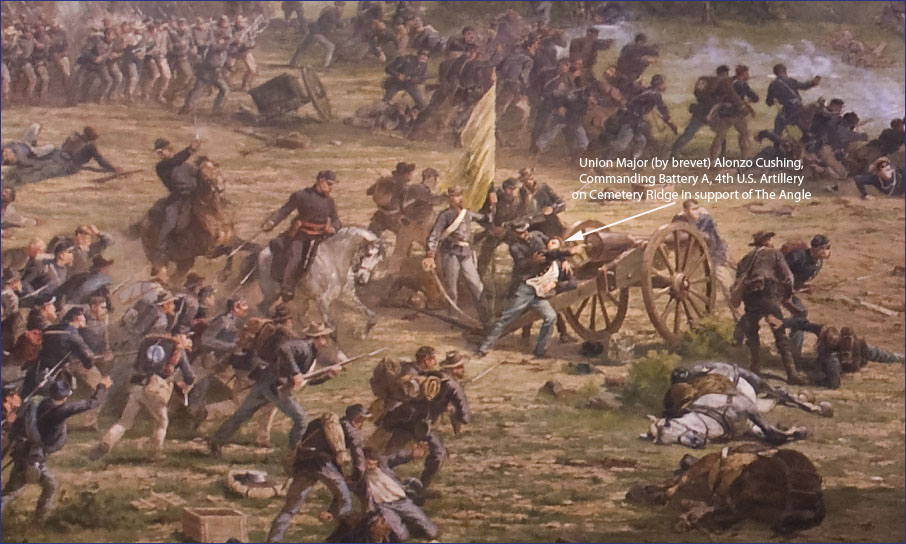
Union Major Alonzo Cushing at The Angle

== Development ==
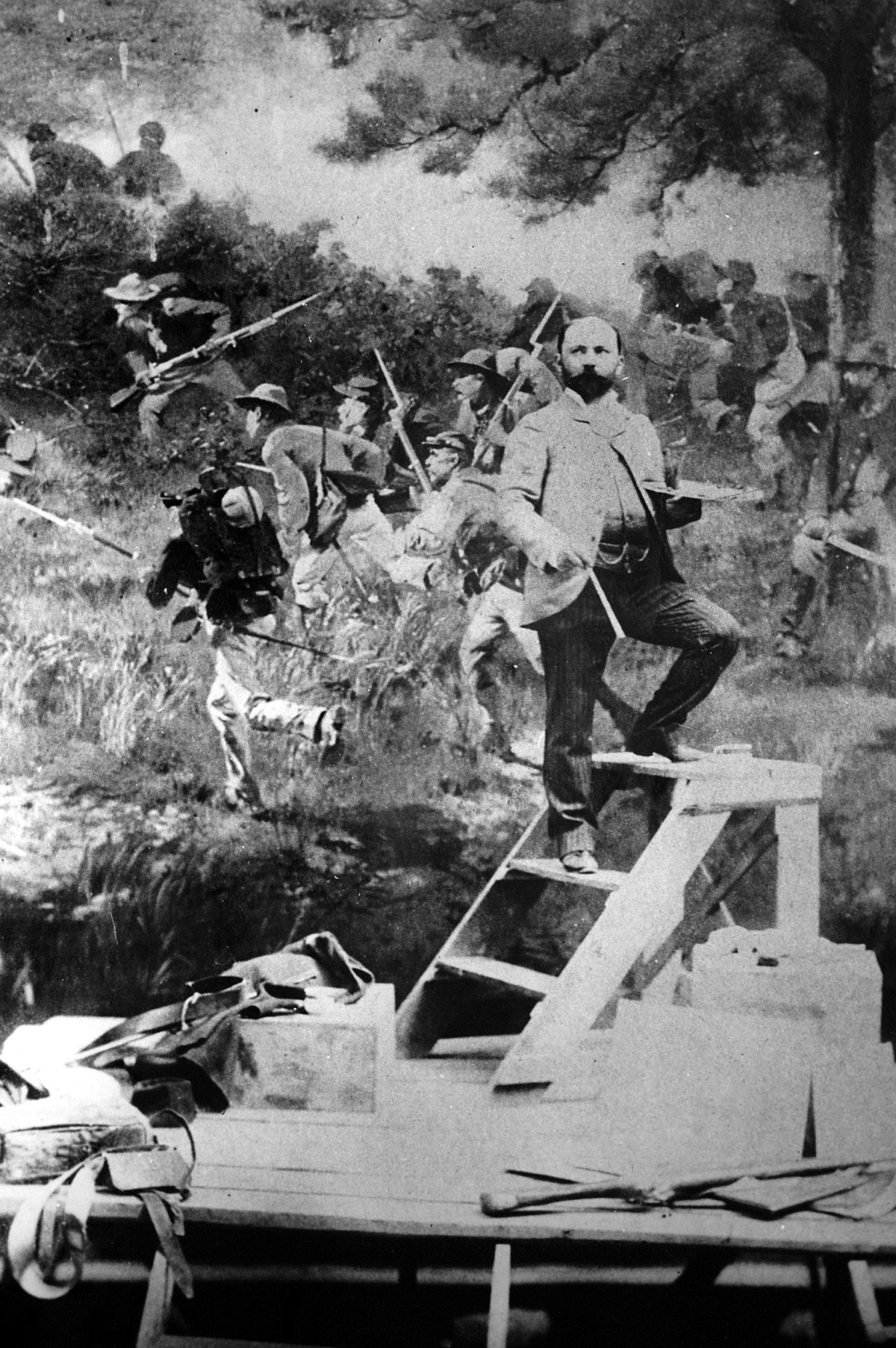
Philippoteaux painting the Gettysburg Cyclorama. The officer depicted on the far right, holding a sword in front of the tree, is an image of the artist, included in the painting as a hidden "signature".

Philippoteaux became interested in cycloramas and, in collaboration with his father, created The Defence of the Fort d'Issy in 1871. Other successful works included Taking of Plevna (Turko-Russian War), the Passage of the Balkans, The Belgian Revolution of 1830, Attack in the Park, The Battle of Kars, The Battle of Tel-el-Kebir, and the Derniere Sortie. He was commissioned by a group of Chicago investors to create the Gettysburg Cyclorama. He spent several weeks in April 1882 at the site of the Gettysburg Battlefield to sketch and photograph the scene, and extensively researched the battle and its events over several months. He erected a wooden platform along present-day Hancock Avenue and drew a circle around it, eighty feet in diameter, driving stakes into the ground to divide it into ten sections. Local photographer William H. Tipton took three photographs of each section, focusing in turn on the foreground, the land behind it, and the horizon. The photos, pasted together, formed the basis of the composition. Philippoteaux also interviewed several survivors of the battle, including Union generals Winfield S. Hancock, Abner Doubleday, Oliver O. Howard, and Alexander S. Webb, and based his work partly on their recollections.

Philippoteaux enlisted a team of five assistants, including his father until his death, to create the final work. It took over a year and a half to complete. The finished painting was nearly 100 yards long and weighed six tons. When completed for display, the full work included not just the painting, but numerous artifacts and sculptures, including stone walls, trees, and fences. The effect of the painting has been likened to the nineteenth century equivalent of an IMAX theater. Four major versions were made: the Chicago copy, the Boston copy, and two others. Of the latter copies, one was cut up and converted into tents for use on an Indian reservation, while the fate of the other is not known.

== Chicago version ==
In 1881, Paul Philippoteaux was commissioned by Charles Willoughby to paint a cyclorama depicting Pickett's Charge for $50,000. Willoughby, Phillippoteaux, and other investors formed the National Panorama Company to display the artwork once it was completed. A location for a building to house the cyclorama was also selected.

The work opened to the public in Chicago on October 22, 1883, to critical acclaim. General John Gibbon, one of the commanders of the Union forces who repelled Pickett's Charge, was among the veterans of the battle who gave it favorable reviews. So realistic was the painting that many veterans of the war were reported to have wept upon seeing it. The painting was displayed in Chicago for ten years; the exhibitors claimed that it was viewed by over two million people during that time. This version was probably not the copy displayed at the 1893 Chicago World's Fair, and a cyclorama displayed in Indianapolis, Indiana, in 1893 was claimed to be the Chicago copy by its presenters. The next year, a copy claimed to be the original Chicago version was on display for a fair in Sioux City, Iowa; it was badly damaged by weather during this display.

For a time, it was believed that a copy of the cyclorama discovered by North Carolinian Joe King in 1965 and later donated to Wake Forest University was the original Chicago copy. While work was being performed on the Boston version of the cyclorama in the 21st century, it was determined that this version was actually a later copy made under the direction of E. J. Austen. This version was sold in 2007, and in 2019 was sold to the North Carolina Civil War & Reconstruction History Center for a fraction of its appraised value.

== Boston version ==
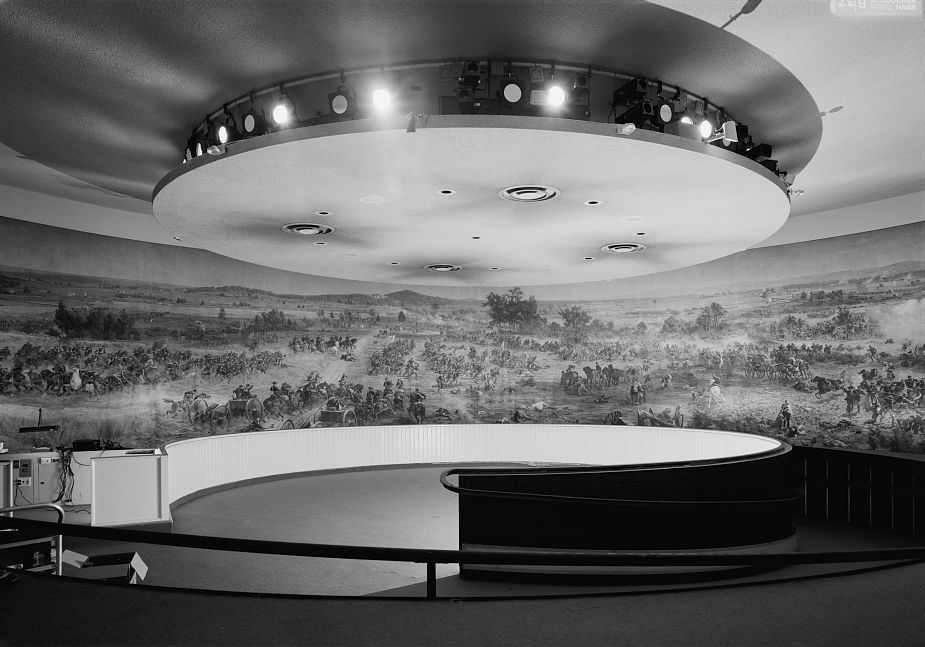
Interior view of the Gettysburg Cyclorama in the former, Neutra building location

The Chicago exhibition was sufficiently successful to prompt businessman Charles L. Willoughby to commission a second version, which opened in Boston, Massachusetts, on December 22, 1884. From its opening until 1892, approximately 200,000 people viewed the painting. The Boston version was housed in a specially designed building, the Cyclorama Building, on Tremont Street, and was the site of popular public lectures on the battle. Two additional copies of the cyclorama were made: the third was first exhibited in Philadelphia, Pennsylvania, beginning in February 1886 and a fourth debuted in Brooklyn, New York, in October 1886.

Many reviewers and visitors agreed with the Boston Daily Advertiser that "it is impossible to tell where reality ends and the painting begins." One veteran, pointing at the painting, said to his friend: "You see that puff of smoke? Just wait a moment till that clears away, and I'll show you just where I stood." In New York, police responding to a report of a nighttime burglary and disoriented by the illusion twice seized dummies representing dead soldiers, convinced that they were live burglars.

In 1891, the Boston cyclorama was sent to Philadelphia, Pennsylvania temporarily, while another cylcorama depicting the Crucifixion of Jesus was displayed in Boston. The immediate following history of the cyclorama is unclear, but it was likely displayed at the 1893 Chicago World's Fair. but by 1896 it had been returned to Boston, where it was stored in a 50-foot (15 m) crate behind the exhibition hall, where it was subjected to damage from weather, vandals removing boards from the crate, and two fires. It was eventually purchased in its deteriorated state by Albert J. Hahne of Newark, New Jersey, in 1910. Hahne displayed sections of the cyclorama in his department store in Newark beginning in 1911, and sections were also shown in government buildings in New York City, Baltimore, Maryland, and Washington, D.C. In the Baltimore exhibition, George E. Pickett's widow, "Sallie" Pickett, lectured on her husband's experiences and found herself very moved by the experience.

== Cyclorama building ==
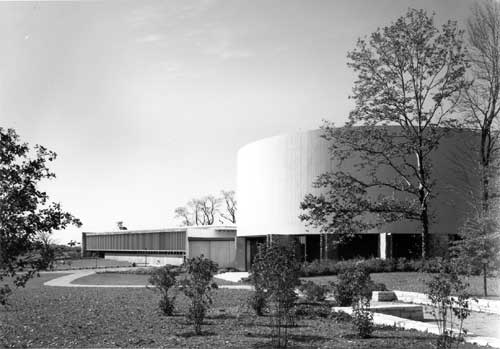
Former Cyclorama building

On September 3, 1912, ground was broken for a new cyclorama building on Baltimore Street in Gettysburg, on Cemetery Hill (on the site of the present day Holiday Inn), near the entrance to the Soldiers' National Cemetery. It opened to the public in 1913, in time for the 50th anniversary of the battle, once again displayed as a full circular painting, rather than in sections. The unheated, leaky brick building took a further toll on the condition of the painting. The Boston cyclorama was purchased by the National Park Service in 1942, and moved to a site on Ziegler's Grove near the new Visitor Center in 1961, after a second round of restoration.

The exhibition was closed in 2005 for a third restoration. The $12-million restoration, by Olin Conservation, Inc., of Great Falls, Virginia, started with the 26 sections of the painting and recreated its original shape of 14 panels hung from a circular railing, slightly flared out at the bottom. In the process, some original pieces were found of the 12 circumferential feet that had been cut away. Fourteen vertical feet of sky was also restored.

A new visitor center at the Gettysburg battlefield was constructed, and the cyclorama painting was moved there after the renovation was completed in 2008. The prior cyclorama building, which had been designed by Richard Neutra, had been built on ground where fighting occurred during the battle. The National Park Service decided to demolish the old building to restore the area to closer to its wartime state, although the proposed demolition met some criticism from preservationists. The building was demolished in early 2013.

== See also ==
- Atlanta Cyclorama
