= Emo subculture =

Youth subculture

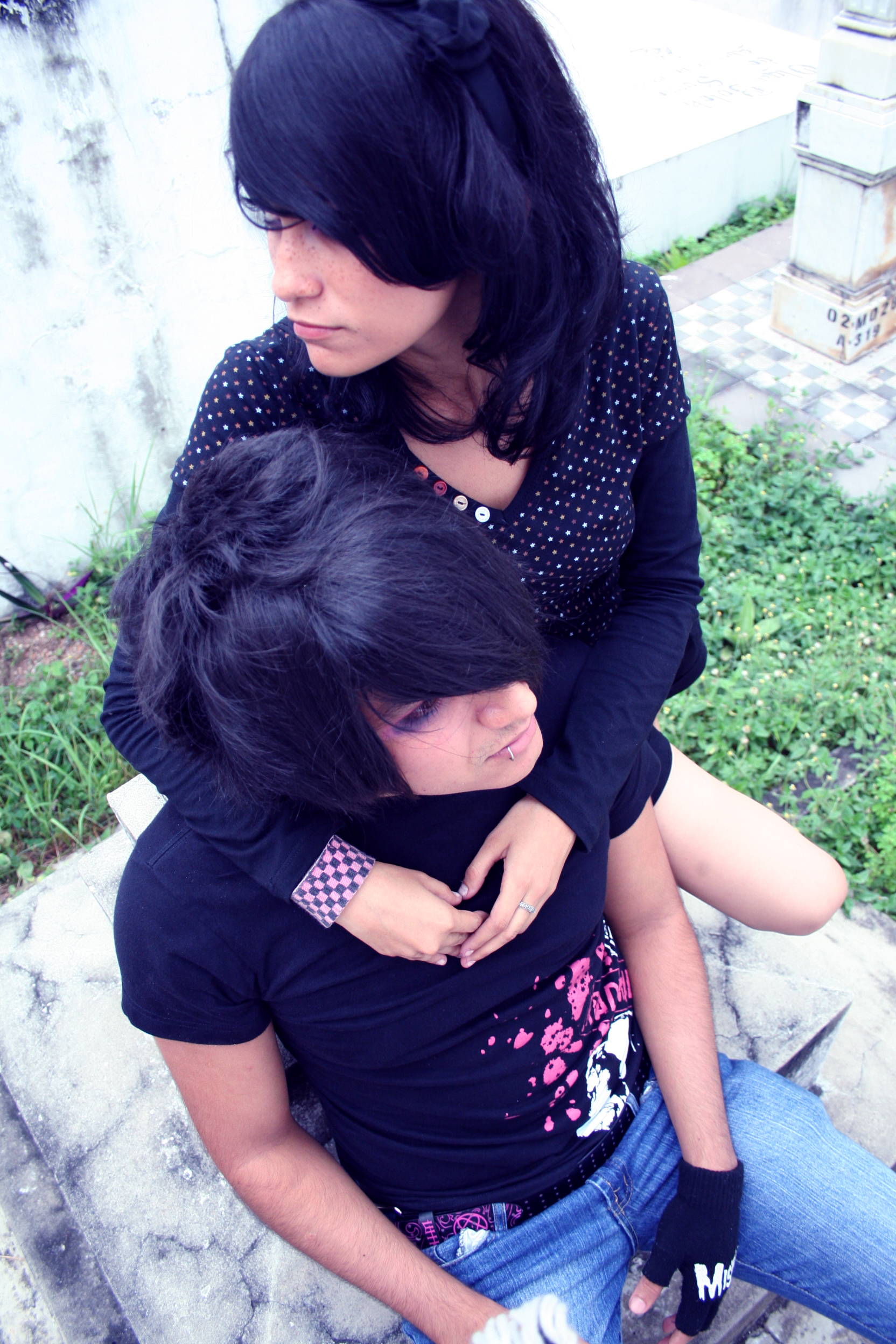
A boy and girl in 2007, displaying hair, fashion and snakebite piercings characteristic of the emo subculture

Emo, whose participants are called emo kids or emos, is a subculture which began in the United States in the 1990s. Based around emo music, the subculture formed in the genre's mid-1990s San Diego scene, where participants were derisively called Spock rock due to their distinctive straight, black haircuts. The subculture entered the mainstream consciousness in the 2000s, being associated with social networks including Myspace, Buzznet and hi5. During this time of popularity, it faced backlash, including violent attacks on emo teens in Mexico and Iraq, and proposed Russian laws targeting the subculture, due to views that it was dangerous and promoted anti-social behavior, depression and suicide. By 2009, this mainstream attention had largely declined as the subculture continued underground on websites including Tumblr and through emo revival groups.

== Fashion ==
=== Clothing ===
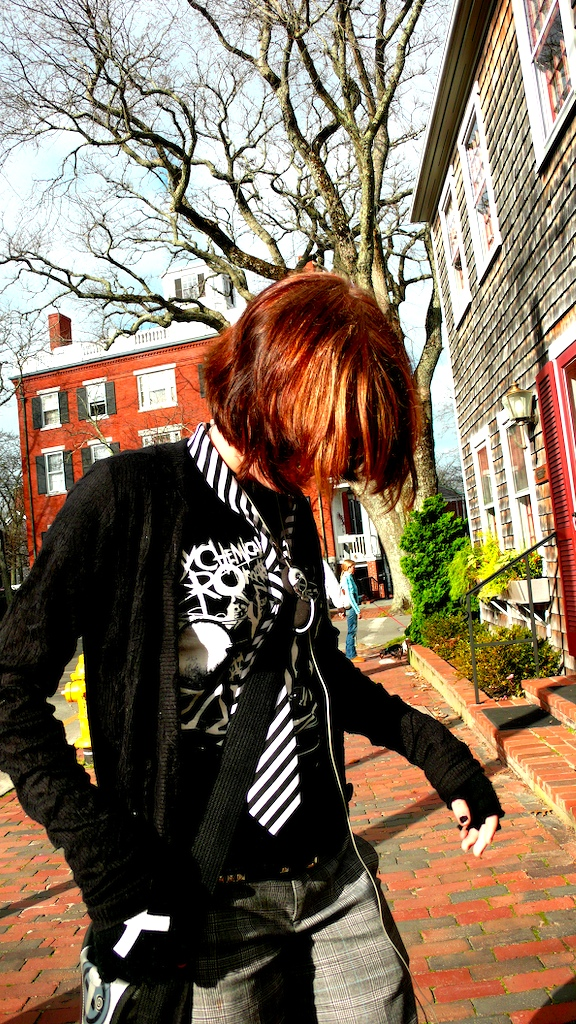
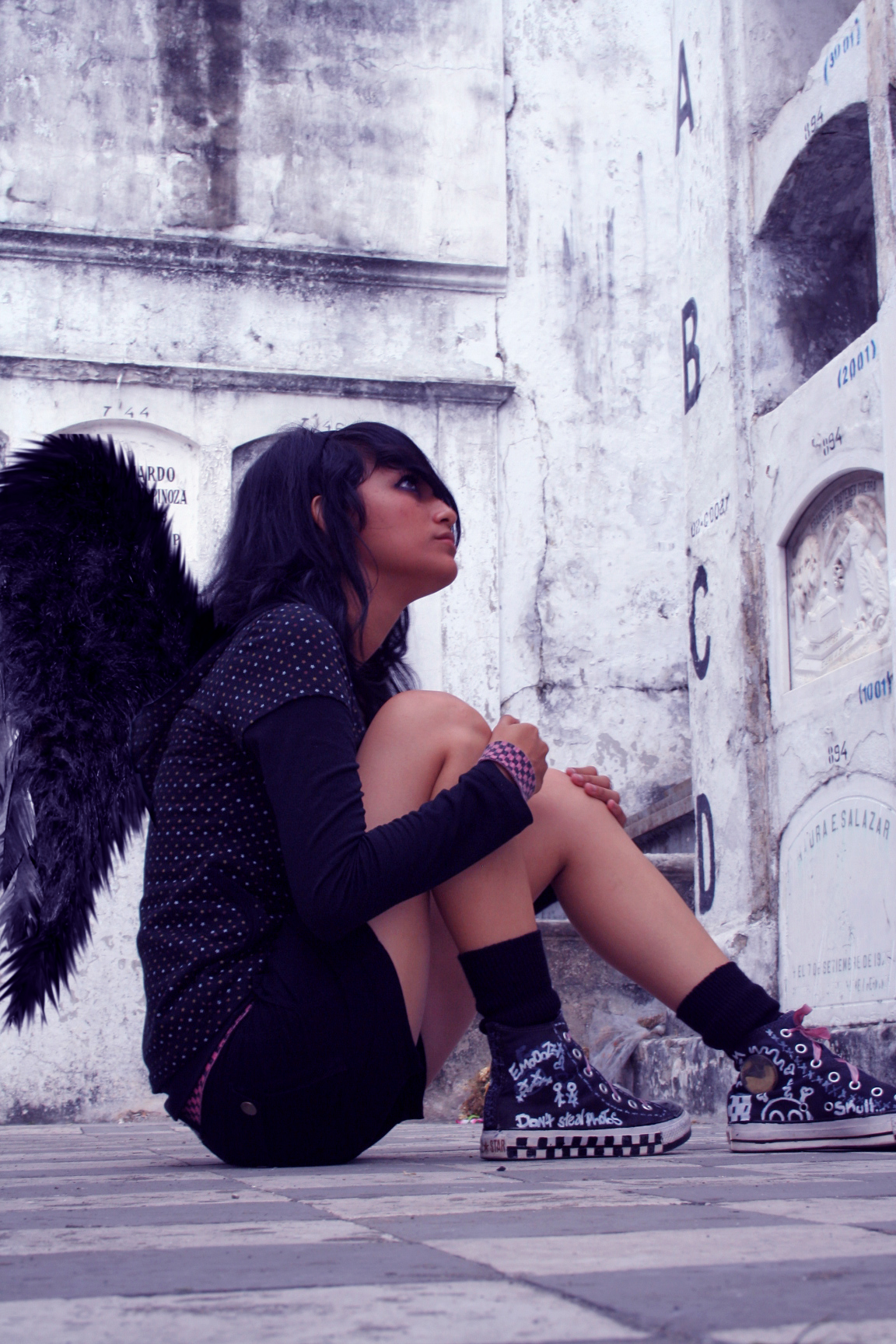
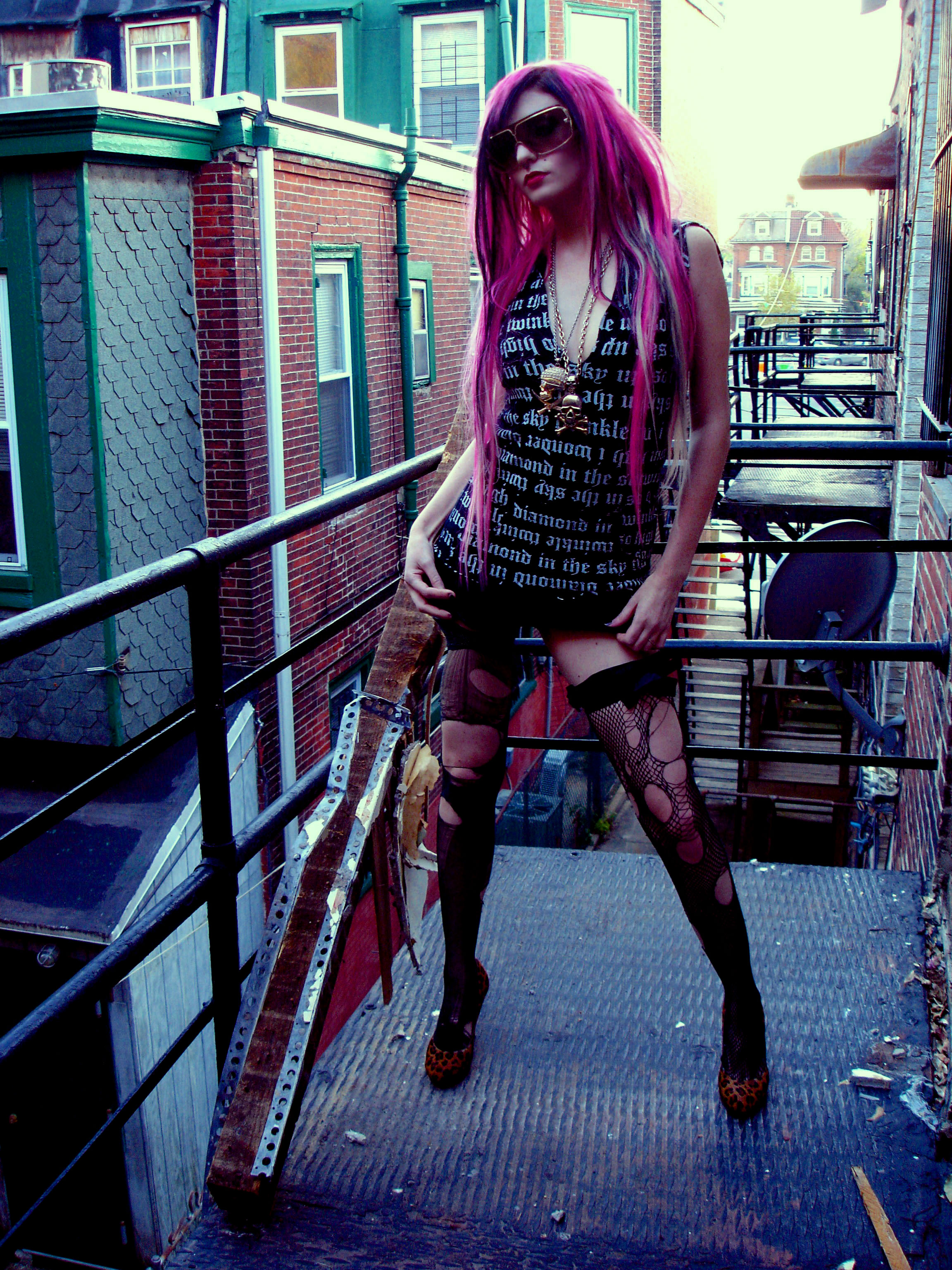
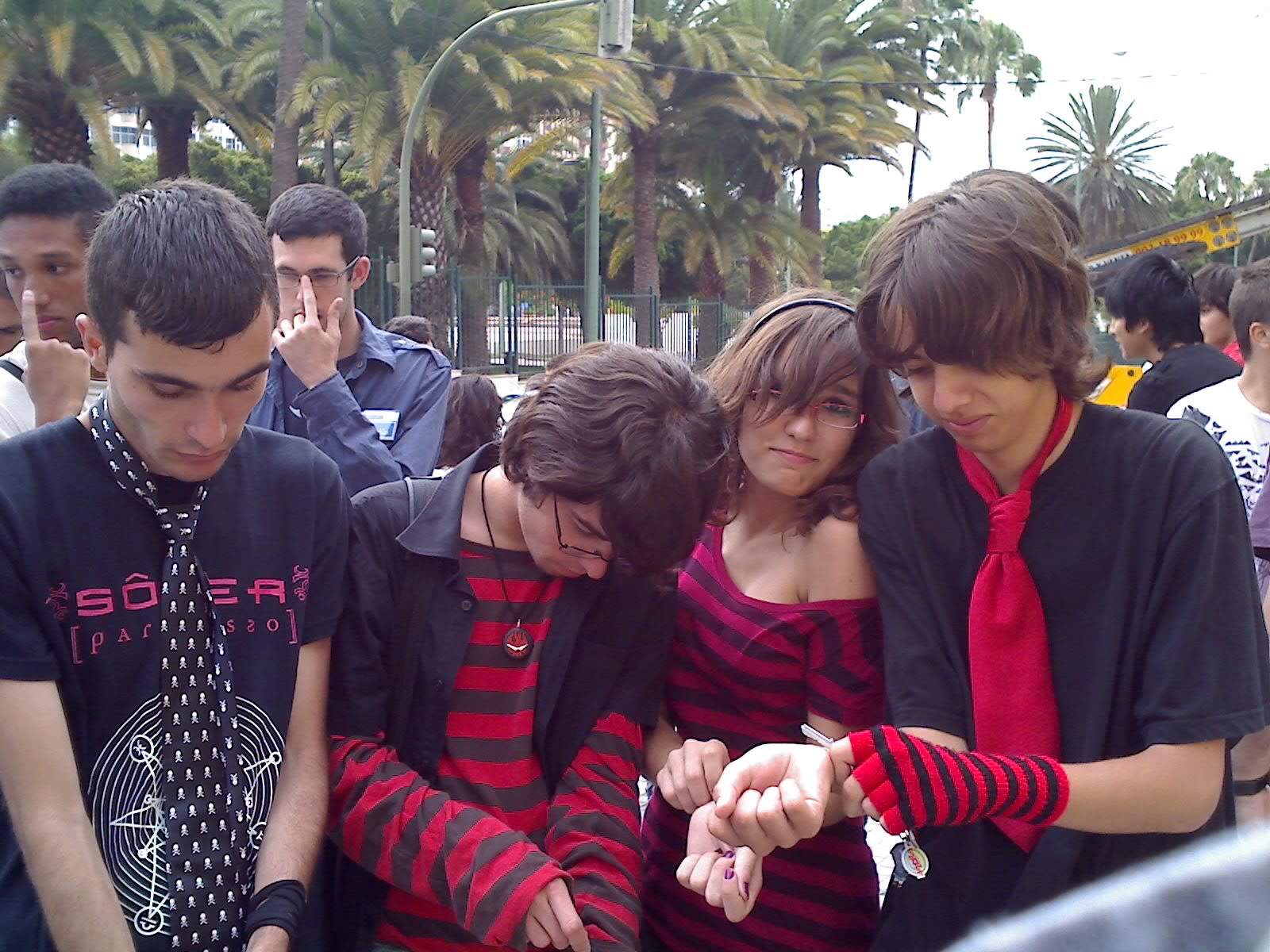

During the 1990s, emo fashion was clean-cut and tended towards geek chic, with clothing items like thick-rimmed glasses resembling those worn by 1950s musician Buddy Holly, button-down shirts, t-shirts, sweater vests, work pants, skinny jeans, converse shoes, dress shoes or generally "chunky" black leather shoes, such as Doc Martens, and cardigans being common.

Emo fashion in the mid-to late 2000s included skinny jeans, tight T-shirts (usually short-sleeved, and often with the names of emo bands), studded belts, Converse sneakers, Vans and black wristbands. Thick, horn-rimmed glasses remained in style to an extent, and eye liner and black fingernails became common during the mid-2000s.

=== Hair and body modifications ===
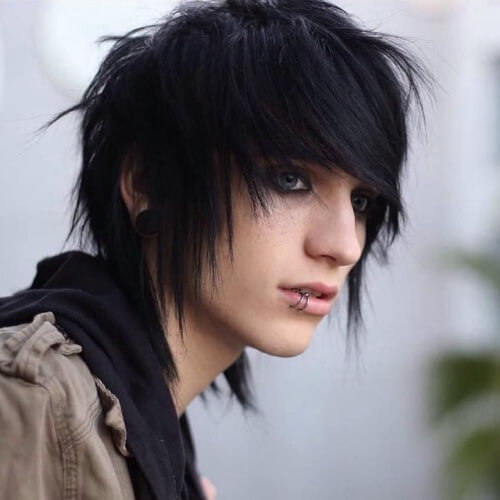
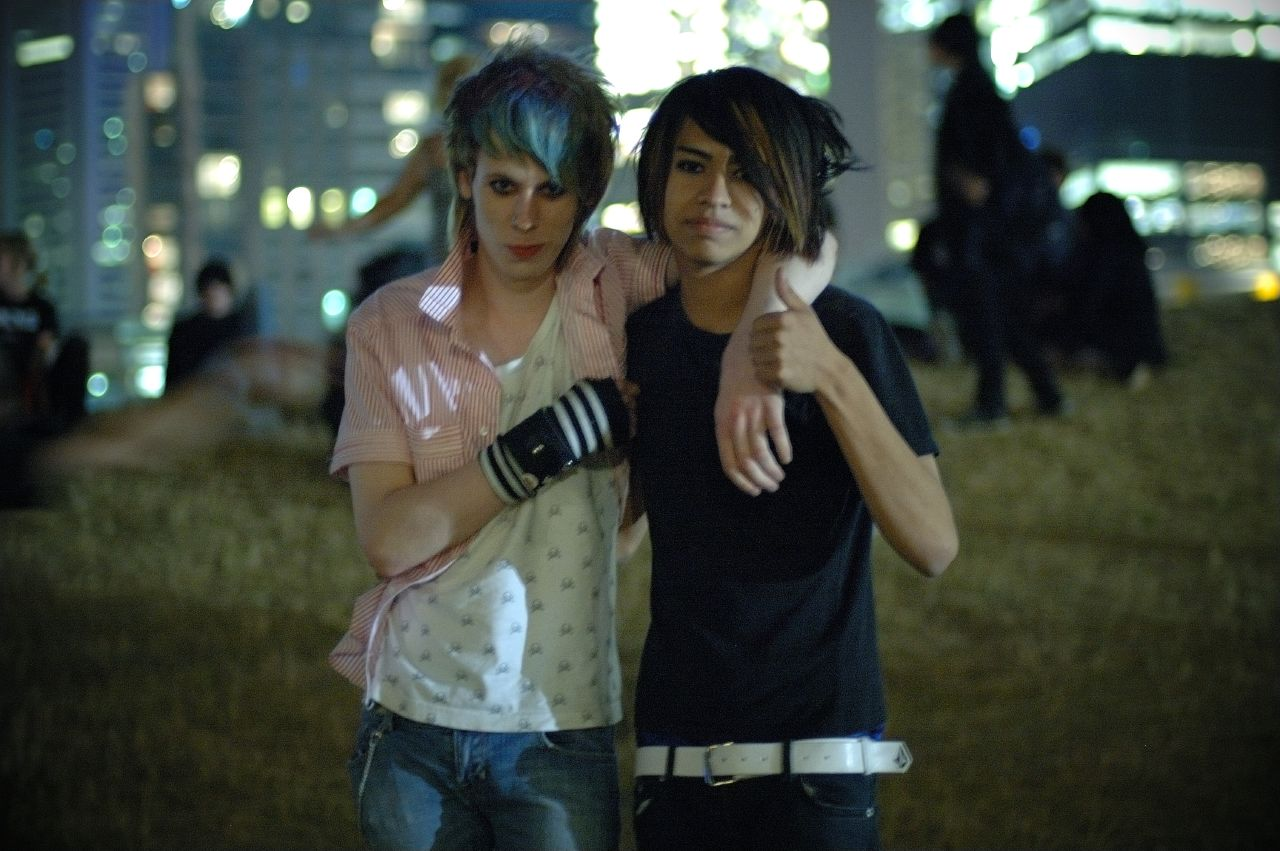

The earliest form of emo hair was the "Spock rock" haircut, which was a style of dyed black hair with straight bangs, popular amongst emos in the mid–1990s. But this had evolved to be longer and have side-swept bangs. By the 2000s, this had developed into a flat, straightened hairstyle with long, side-swept bangs covering one eye. This style is often called simply "emo hair", and was popular outside of the subculture in the 2000s and 2010s. The hairstyle has been subject to controversy, with some optometrists suggesting having one eye covered by hair can lead to the development of amblyopia. A variation of this style was the "shotgun blast" haircut, which included the same front as the emo haircut, however with the back of the hair spiked up.

Other popular hairstyles amongst the subculture was the bob cut (often A-line), swoop and skullet. Generally emo haircuts contained layers and were kept uncombed and oily. Emos sometimes dyed their hair, usually black, however blocks of bleached hair and neon colors were also common. Occasionally, multiple colors were used to make patterns such as raccoon stripes or cheetah spots. Some emos cut their hair using razor blades.

Snakebite lip piercings and stretched lobe piercings are popular amongst the subculture.

== History ==
=== Origins (mid–1980s to mid–1990s) ===
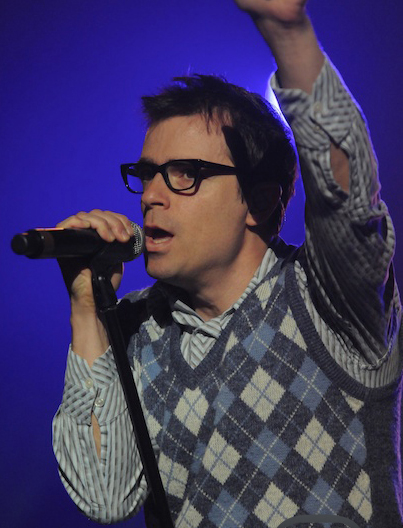
In the 1990s, emo fashion tended towards geek chic.

The emo music genre was pioneered in the mid-1980s by Washington D.C. hardcore musicians who sought to make less violent and more emotional music, like Rites of Spring, Embrace and Dag Nasty. The "emocore" label quickly spread through the scene to refer to these bands, and was associated with many bands signed to Ian MacKaye's record label Dischord Records. Although many of the bands rejected the term, it stayed. Jenny Toomey recalled, "The only people who used it at first were the ones that were jealous over how big and fanatical a scene it was. [Rites of Spring] existed well before the term did and they hated it. But there was this weird moment, like when people started calling music 'grunge,' where you were using the term even though you hated it." The Washington, D.C. emo scene lasted only a few years, and by 1986, most of emo's major bands (including Rites of Spring, Embrace and Gray Matter) had broken up.

The beginning of emo as a subculture rather than just a style of music dates back to the mid-1990s San Diego scene. Bands in this scene, such as Heroin, Antioch Arrow and Swing Kids, and participants in this scene were often called "Spock rock", in reference to their black-dyed hair with straight fringes. In a 2024 episode of the Cult & Culture podcast both Justin Pearson (of Swing Kids) and Aaron Montaigne (of Heroin and Antioch Arrow) referenced that the scene's dress sense began immediately following a performance by Washington D.C. band the Nation of Ulysses, who wore suits. Pearson soon had choppy spikes protruding from the back of his head alongside straight fringes, which was a prototype for the emo "shotgun blast" haircut. In a 2020 interview with NoEcho, Pearson cited the band's aesthetic as being based on mods, greasers, the Situationist International, the artists on Blue Note Records and the minimalism of Crass.

A defining aspect of 1990s emo were the all-ages shows. Often times, the musicians involved in emo were under 21, which restricted them from performing in bars or nightclubs. As a result, bands would often book shows at libraries, churches, community centers, or cafés. Notable venues that fall under this category include The First Unitarian Church of Philadelphia, Huntington Beach Public Library, The Fireside Bowl, 924 Gilman Street, ABC No Rio, and the Ché Cafe

After the 1998 release of the music video for "New Noise" by Swedish hardcore punk band Refused, straight, black hair with long, swooped bangs became common. Refused adopted this haircut alongside black clothing and nail polish. In January 2002, the Honolulu Advertiser described emo people as "intentionally unshowy": "these guys often ride bicycles, keep diaries, write poetry and hang out at coffee shops. They prefer art films to Hollywood blockbusters and frequent independent music stores. They are usually shy and introspective."

=== Subsequent development (late 1990s) ===
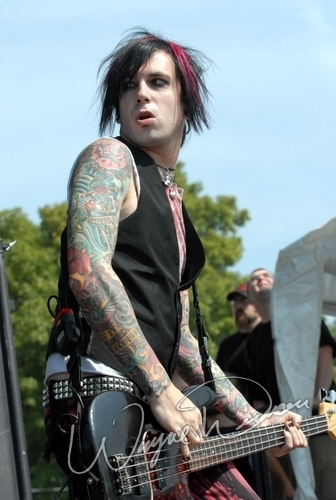
Eighteen Visions' "fashioncore" look was a prototype for 2000s emo fashion.

Metalcore band Eighteen Visions was the band that expanded the prototype of later emo fashion. As many hardcore bands in the 1990s had a hypermasculine image characterized by shaved heads, baseball caps and tattoos, Eighteen Visions wanted to rebel against this image. Inspired by the look of bands like Orgy and Unbroken, Eighteen Visions dressed in effeminate fashion, including skinny jeans, straightened hair, swooped bangs, black clothes and eyeliner. This emphasise on the band's presentation lead to them being derogatorily labeled "fashioncore". Fashioncore became a popular trend in hardcore and metalcore in the early 2000s, and other bands began to be labeled as fashioncore including Avenged Sevenfold, Bleeding Through and Atreyu. Influenced by the members of Eighteen Visions, emos in the early 2000s became increasingly experimental with their hair, making use of layers, asymmetrical fringes and cutting hair using razorblades. Haircuts such as the Bob and the A-Line cut were also popular.

=== Mainstream prevalence (2000s) ===
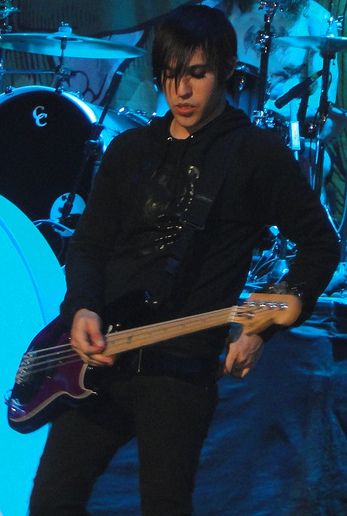
Pete Wentz of Fall Out Boy displaying features of emo fashion: skinny jeans, eye liner, and flat, straight, jet-black hair with long bangs covering the face

Around 2002, the term "scene queen" began to be used as a pejorative against attractive, popular women perceived by older hardcore musicians as only being involved in hardcore for the subculture. Through this term, people who participated in the fashioncore-influenced style of emo dress began to be termed scene, which would eventually develop into its own subculture of emo. As time went on, scene became less intertwined with hardcore, instead gravitating to early social networks including Myspace, Buzznet and hi5, and metalcore music.

Fashioncore spread to the West Coast of the United States with the success of Long Island's From Autumn to Ashes and, California band, A Static Lullaby's 2003 tour, with support from New Jersey's Senses Fail. The New Jersey scene became what ultimately brought the subculture to mainstream attention.

As emo became known by the mainstream it received backlash. Anti-emo groups attacked teenagers in Mexico City, Querétaro, and Tijuana in 2008 in what NPR called "The Mexican Emo Wars". Legislation was proposed in Russia's Duma regulating emo websites and banning emo attire in schools and government buildings, with the subculture perceived as a "dangerous teen trend" promoting anti-social behaviour, depression, social withdrawal and suicide. The BBC reported that in March 2012, Shia militias in Iraq shot or beat to death as many as 58 young Iraqi emos.

=== Decline in mainstream popularity (2010s) ===
Emo had largely left the mainstream by 2009. In the subsequent years, the subculture became based mostly around Tumblr. Junkee Media writer Bianca Devino described Tumblr emos as having "a cooler, Instagram-ready image... marked by Autumn leaves, flannel, thick rimmed glasses, and Fender Telecasters". A key aspect of this was the posting of images of pastel coloured forests with lyrics from emo revival bands, like Modern Baseball, Tigers Jaw, the Front Bottoms and Citizen, superimposed on top. During this era, many emos began dressing in the soft grunge fashion style which was popular on the website at the time.

=== Revival attempts ===
Beginning in 2019, there were several movements promoting the return of the subculture, such as #20ninescene (2019) and the "Rawring 20s" (2020s). Websites like SpaceHey and FriendProject, which retain Myspace's early design, have gained popularity among teenagers, and social media influencers on Instagram and TikTok have begun adopting scene fashion. Around this time, the subculture was also influential on the development of the e-girls and e-boys subculture.

== See also ==
- Scene (subculture)
- Pop-punk
- Horror punk
- Goth subculture
- Post-hardcore
