= Emos vs. Punks =

2008 confrontations between emos and punks and other subcultures in Mexico

- Date: 2008–2009
- Location: Mexico
- Also known as: Emo Wars-Subcultures civil war
- Type: Confrontation
- Cause: Conflict between emo and other subcultures
- Target: Emo groups
- Perpetrator: Anti-emo groups
- Outcome: The emo groups disappeared progressively
- Injuries: 3 (Querétaro City)
- Arrests: 28 (Querétaro City)

Emos vs. Punks was a series of confrontations that occurred in Mexico from 2008 to 2009 in Mexico between emos and anti-emo groups, mainly punks.

The emo movement emerged in Mexico in the early 2000s. It was influenced by the international subculture of the United States and pop punk music, known for its emotionally expressive lyrics. Fashion drew inspiration from androgynous styles, including skinny jeans and men wearing make-up, both uncommon in the country at that time. In Mexico City, emos first gathered at the Tianguis Cultural del Chopo, a flea market known for hosting various underground subcultures, including punk and heavy metal communities.

As the movement became mainstream in the country, mainly among teenagers and young adults, anti-emo groups formed, which claimed that emos were appropriating and imitating their subcultures. Harassment from anti-emo groups escalated over time, with some even calling for the assassination of emos. In Mexico City, the anti-emo groups expelled emos from El Chopo market, prompting them to regroup at the Glorieta de los Insurgentes traffic circle, at the clandestine club Los Sillones.

In March 2008, a group of emos was attacked in Querétaro City. Alleging that the emos were attempting to expand and appropriate more zones in Mexico City, anti-emo groups organized a confrontation at the traffic circle on 16 March 2008 via social network services. Police officers partially controlled the mob, but the unrest resumed a few hours later. It was not until members of the Hare Krishna movement intervened and diverted the attention from both groups that the brawl ended. In the following weeks, emo groups held demonstrations in the country, calling for respect and tolerance. Subsequently, the emo movement in Mexico declined, as many individuals either abandoned the identity or integrated into other subcultures.

== Emo subculture in Mexico ==
The emo subculture emerged in Mexico around 2002. Social network services, like MySpace, hi5, and MetroFLOG, were gaining popularity among teenagers and young adults. Musically, international rock groups like My Chemical Romance, Paramore, and Fall Out Boy, as well as local bands like Panda, Delux and Kudai, surged or became popular. Emo lyrics typically focused on personal emotions and introspection, differing from the politically and socially charged themes found in punk music. The associated fashion embraced androgynous styles, including skinny jeans, makeup, and the signature emo hairstyle with long bangs covering one eye. Over time, emo fashion became more widespread, and isolated groups became mainstream. In Mexico City, some members gathered at the Tianguis Cultural del Chopo, a street flea market known for hosting a variety of underground scenes, including punks, goths, metalheads, skinheads, among others.

== Anti-emo groups ==
The emo subculture faced backlash from members of other youth scenes, who perceived it as a parody or superficial imitation of their own identities. Emos were perceived as emotionally fragile and inauthentic, adopting the style solely for aesthetic reasons. Kristoff Raczyñski, a host on TeleHit—a Televisa cable television channel similar to MTV—dismissed the subculture as a trend for "little girls who are 15 years old", adding that "[t]here isn't a movement here. There isn't a unified manner of thinking, there [aren't] musicians. You have confused hard rock, punk and screamo and you have grouped all the ideas of these scenes, just to give significance to your stupid bullshit movement."

Emos were constantly harassed at El Chopo market, prompting them to relocate to the Glorieta de los Insurgentes, a traffic roundabout along Avenida de los Insurgentes, in the clandestine club Los Sillones. Punks interpreted this move as an attempt by emos to expand their presence. Anti-emo groups surged in the country, and tensions rose among punks and metalheads, who viewed emos as a threat to their subcultural values and code. Their sentiment grew hostile, with incidents of emos getting their bangs cut and the spread of slogans such as Haz patria y mata a un emo ("Do your duty and kill an emo"). Online anti-emo groups emerged, including Movimiento Anti Emosexual—a portmanteau combining emo and homosexual—and Anti Emo Death Squad, the latter hosted on Last.fm.

Fernanda Guzmán said on NPR that stereotypes surrounding emotional behavior and fashion may have contributed to a bullying culture, primarily because emos were perceived as effeminate. This perception conflicted with Mexico's widespread culture of machismo and homophobia, in contrast to punks and metalheads, whereas the latter subcultures were associated with more traditionally masculine traits. Daniel Hernandez commented that emos were associated with higher-income backgrounds, which generated discontent in a country marked by a significant divide between lower and upper classes. He also suggested that the phenomenon might reflect broader effects of globalization on "traditional Mexican culture".

== Confrontations ==
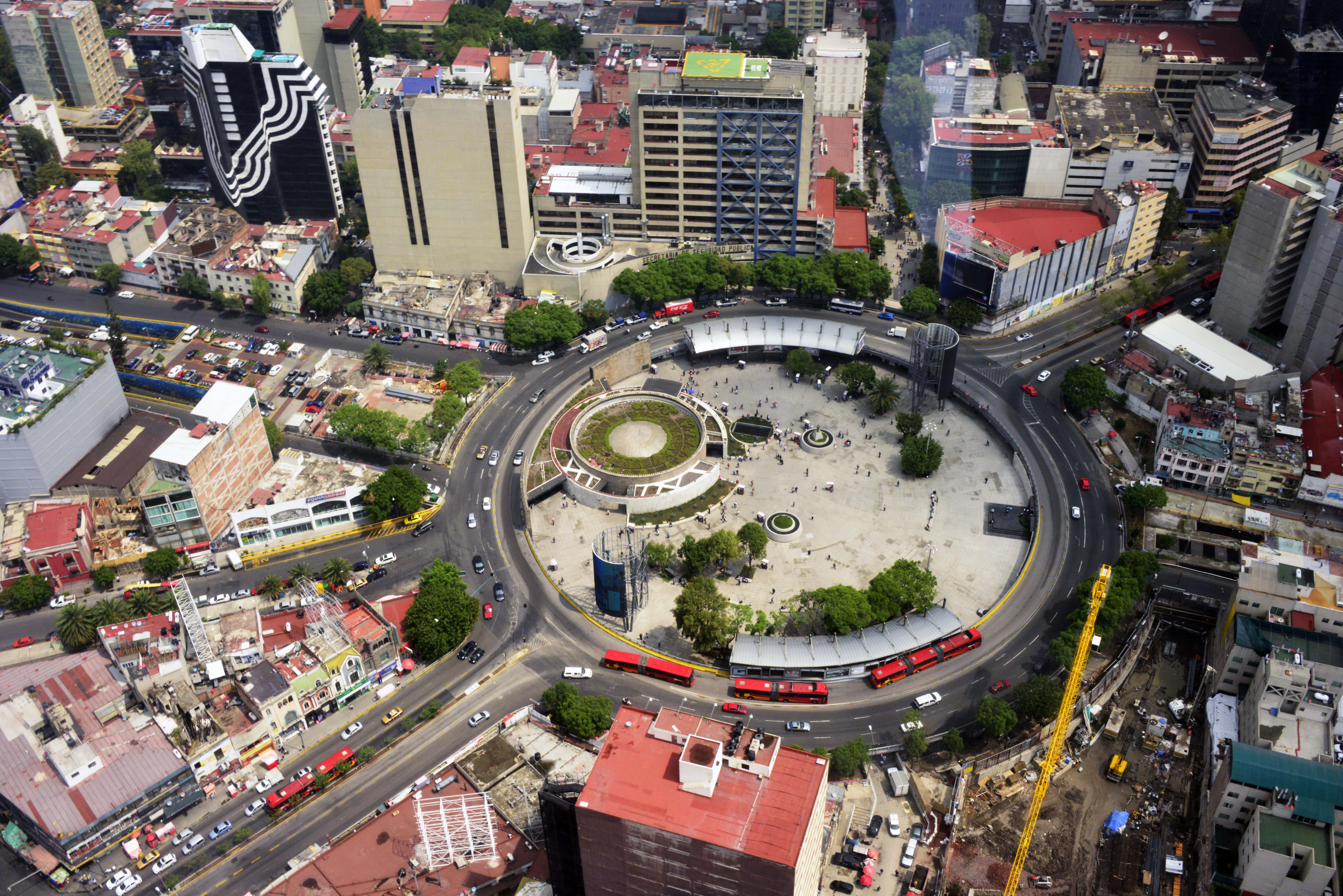
A confrontation took place at the Glorieta de los Insurgentes (pictured) in 2008

On 7 March 2008, around 800 people gathered in Querétaro City to attack emos. The movement, driven by online groups and email chain letters, targeted those who rejected the "emo look and attitude". The crowd assaulted three teenagers in a city plaza, punching and kicking them. Police arrested 28 people.

The following week, on the afternoon of 16 March, anti-emo groups gathered at the Glorieta de los Insurgentes to attack emos at Los Sillones. The two groups exchanged verbal confrontations, but quickly escalated to physical violence with belts. City police intervened to separate both groups, but a few hours later, the brawl resumed. It was only deescalated when members of the Hare Krishna movement—who regularly sang at the traffic circle on Saturdays—invited both sides to join them in singing.

In Tijuana, metalheads warned emos not to attend the city's fair the following month. In 2009, further clashes between emos and anti-emos occurred in Tampico.

== Aftermath and impact ==
Emo groups held demonstrations in several cities, requesting respect. In Mexico City, they attempted to return to the El Chopo market, but were blocked by anti-emo groups. In the following years, the emo scene dwindled, with Guzmán attributing it to teenagers aging out of the subculture or merging into others while continuing their search for identity.

The events were referenced in an episode of La rosa de Guadalupe in 2008 in the episode "Soy emo" (transl. "I'm emo"). Seventeen years later, the television series released an unofficial sequel episode titled "Lo difícil de ser yo" (transl. "The hard part about being me"), in which the protagonist from the original episode is now portrayed as a strict mother whose experiences of discrimination during her emo adolescence shaped her behavior.

In 2025, a peaceful commemorative march took place at the Glorieta de los Insurgentes, where participants staged a symbolic mock street fight.

== See also ==
- 2012 emo killings in Iraq
- Mods and rockers
