= 2012 Iraq emo killings =

Series of murders of Iraqi teenagers in 2012

Coordinates: 33.325°N 44.422°E

Emo Killings in Iraq during 2012
- Location: Baghdad, Iraq
- Date: March 2012
- Target: Iraqi teenage boys who dressed in an emo style, and assumed homosexuals
- Attack type: Homicide, torture, kidnapping
- Weapons: Cement blocks, firearms, bladed weapons
- Deaths: Between 6 and 70
- Perpetrator: Paramilitary groups
- Motive: Attack on Western culture and association of emo with homosexuality

The 2012 emo killings in Iraq were a string of homicides that were claimed by some sources to be part of a campaign against Iraqi teenage boys who dressed in an emo style carried out by paramilitary groups as an attack on Western culture. It is has been believed that between 6 and 70 young men were beaten to death with cement blocks in Baghdad in March 2012, but BBC News reported that little of it has been verified and that Iraqi authorities have completely denied that any killings happened. In September 2012, BBC News reported that targeted killings against homosexual people were also happening.

== Background ==
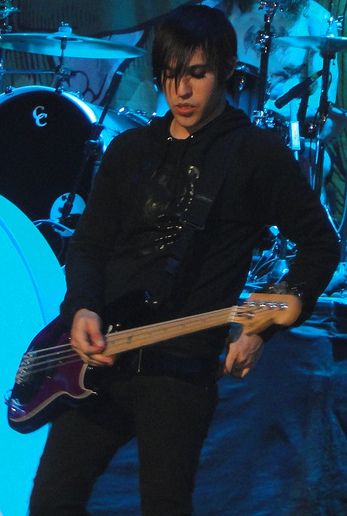
Pete Wentz of Fall Out Boy displaying features of emo fashion: skinny jeans, eye liner, and flat, straight, jet-black hair with long bangs covering the face

The emo subculture gained popularity among Iraqi teens in 2011. Emo, a form of post-hardcore, is associated in most of the world with teen fashion and alienation, but in the Arab world is also strongly associated with homosexuality and satanism. Homosexuality was not illegal in Iraq at the time but has always been taboo, and many LGBT people in Iraq are discriminated against, abused or murdered. Activists say anti-gay harassment has increased since the invasion of Iraq and subsequent Iraq War, with gay Iraqis being bullied and harassed by security forces, and beaten and killed by reactionary paramilitary groups in heavily Shiite areas of Baghdad, including Sadr City and Al-Shu'ala, since at least 2006.

Before the 2003 invasion of Iraq, sexual minorities there enjoyed a fair amount of freedom, but the invasion brought to power the conservative Islamic Dawa Party and Human Rights Watch says that since 2004, hundreds of Iraqi gay men have been killed. The campaign has been said to be led by the Mahdi Army, with Iraqi security forces said to have "colluded and joined in the killing." Witnesses told Human Rights Watch the killers broke into houses, picked up people in the street, interrogated them to extract the names of other victims, killed them and mutilated their bodies.

By 2007, according to the London-based human rights organization Iraqi LGBT, Iraqi political and religious organizations had launched an organised, coordinated campaign to hunt, arrest, torture and kill everyone they perceived as gay. Iraqi LGBT says the Iraqi government forces gay people to give names and addresses of other gays, then arrests them and hands them over to paramilitary groups to be murdered.

Israeli intelligence analyst Daniel Brode claims the murders are part of an overall shift inside the Iraqi Shiite-Arab population towards becoming "more religious, more conservative and more assertive," with the goal of consolidating its own power by creating a "fundamentalist Shiite government." In The Guardian newspaper, American human rights activist Scott Long described Iraq as "a devastated society with a broken political process and a fractured public" and said the labelling of the murders as "gay killings" was "counterproductive". He called on Iraq to begin a debate about difference, mentioning the events of the previous 40 years.

== Killings ==
In February 2012, the Baghdad Morality Police published a statement on the Iraqi Interior Ministry website criticizing emo teens for wearing "strange, tight clothes with pictures of skulls on them", as well as nose and tongue piercings. The statement condemned emo as Satanic, and quoted Colonel Mushtaq Taleb al-Mahemdawi as saying the Morality Police had been given official approval by the Interior Ministry "to eliminate [the phenomenon] as soon as possible", as they believed it had a negative effect on Iraqi society. The New York Times reported that in the following weeks, anti-emo flyers threatening death "unless gay men cut their hair, stopped wearing the clothing of devil worshippers and stopped listening to metal, emo and rap music", began appearing in neighbourhoods across Baghdad.

Interior Ministry security officers say the number of dead is six. However, the Reuters news agency reported that hospital and security officials put the number at 14 or more, and human rights groups such as the Brussels Tribunal said that the body count could be as high as 101. The Associated Press reported that an unnamed Interior Ministry official put the number at 58, and said all but one were male. According to the BBC, the United Nations puts the number of dead at 12 minimum, but believes the real number is much higher.

The dead were found in dumpsters, after having been beaten to death with cement blocks in a practice known as "death by blocking" or "mawt al-blokkah". A person who survived one such attack told the Beirut-based newspaper Al Akhbar that concrete blocks are thrown at teenagers' arms and legs before being thrown at their heads, repeating the process if the boys survived.

== Aftermath and responsibility for the murders ==
As a result of the emo killings, the International Gay and Lesbian Human Rights Commission joined Human Rights Watch and Amnesty International in March 2012 to call on Iraqi authorities to investigate the killings, saying they are the work of paramilitary groups and the police, including groups such as the Mahdi Army, created in 2003 by Shia cleric Muqtada al-Sadr. The Dutch government stated that it "expanded" its asylum policy towards LGBTQ Iraqis in May 2012. The U.S. State Department's 2013 Country Reports on Human Rights Practices for Iraq reported that in 2013, Iraq's Council of Ministers established an inter-ministerial committee that issued a statement saying LGBTQ people are "no different" from others, and that established a charter to describe the baseline protection owed to them.

Iraqi commentators and American professor of Middle Eastern history Mark LeVine have speculated that deploying paramilitary groups against emo kids serves Iraqi authorities' interests by keeping the groups occupied, and deflecting the groups' anger and unhappiness from other possible targets in chaotic post-war Iraq. Iraqi television network Al Sumaria reported that Sadr denied responsibility for the deaths, calling the emo teens fools and unnatural but saying they should be dealt with through legal means. Following coverage of the murders, Iraqi officials denied there was any campaign to kill gay or emo teenagers, and said the story was made up to serve anti-religious and anti-government agendas. They added that emo teens can dress as they please, and that the government will protect them. In September 2012, the BBC reported that arrests and killings are still ongoing.

== See also ==
- Emos vs. Punks, confrontations against emos in Mexico in 2008
- LGBT activism in Iraq
- LGBT history in Iraq
- LGBT rights in Iraq
- Murder of Doski Azad
- Subculture
- Violence against LGBTQ people
