= Huntington Beach Public Library on Triangle Park =

Library in Huntington Beach, California, US

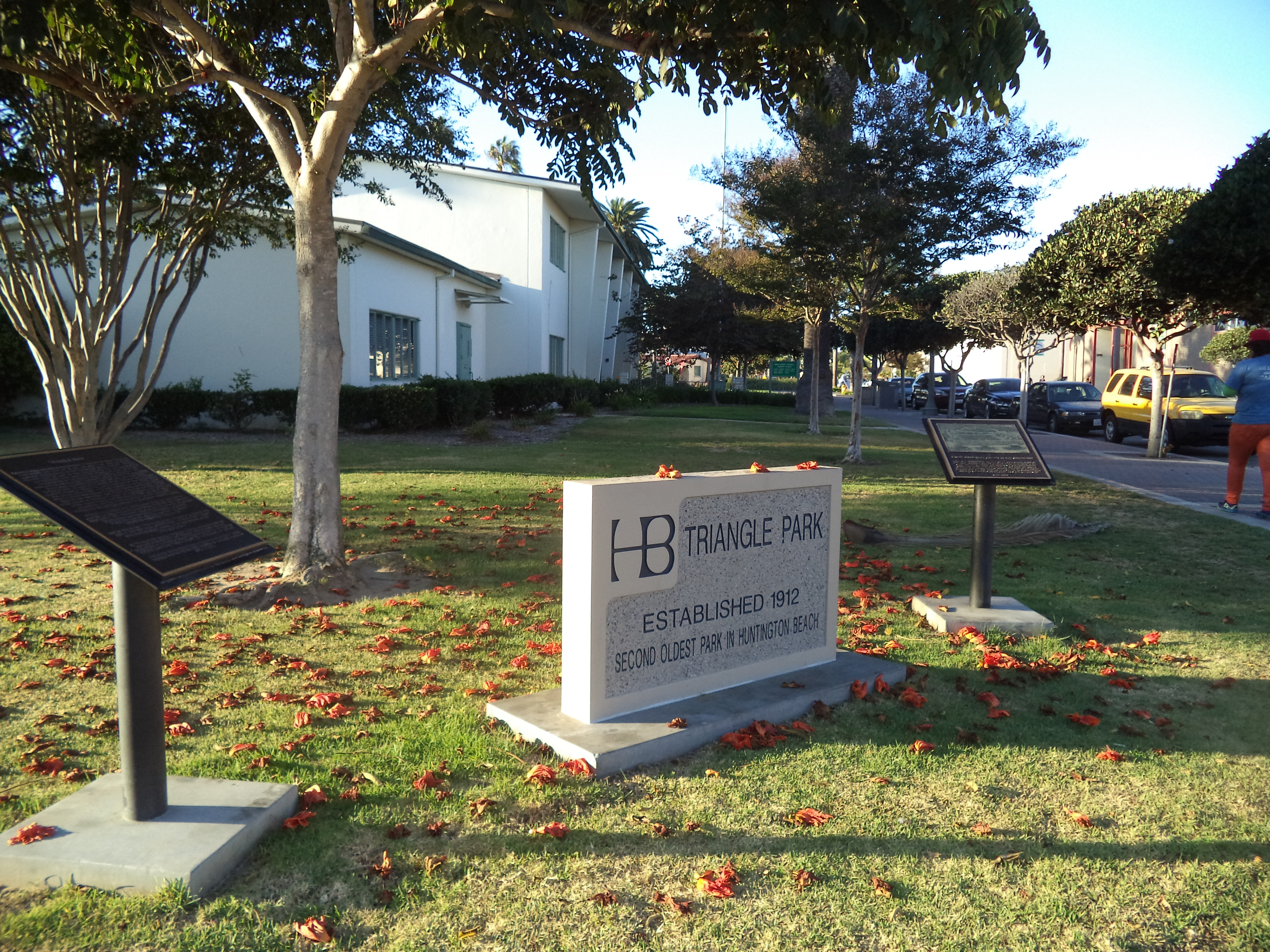
- 33°39′43″N 117°59′57″W
- Location: Huntington Beach, California

The Huntington Beach Public Library on Triangle Park, also known as the Main Street Branch Library, is located on Triangle Park, 525 Main Street, in the City of Huntington Beach, California.

The Main Street Branch Library is one of four branch libraries for the City of Huntington Beach Public Library system and, along with Triangle Park, is one of the 122 historic properties and districts listed on the National Register of Historic Places for Orange County, California.

Both the Main Street Branch Library and Triangle Park were listed on the National Register of Historic Places on April 13, 2013, by the United States Department of the Interior, Reference Number 13000157.

== Main Street Branch Library ==
Construction began on the 9,034-square-foot Main Street Branch Library in 1949, in what was known as the International Style, and more recently called Mid Century Modern. The library opened in 1951, and the town's original Carnegie Library (1914-1951) at 8th and Walnut streets was closed and demolished. From the City of Huntington Beach City Clerk's "Historical Notes" (1975), “When the current Main Street facility (library), consisting of 9,000 square feet, was completed in 1951, it was celebrated for its size and its design." The Library was dedicated in 1951 by Huntington Beach Mayor Vernon Langenbeck. The Main Street Branch Library held a collection of between 40,000 and 50,000 books and served as the main public library for the community from 1951 up until 1975.

The architectural firm of McLellan, MacDonald and Marcwith designed the Main Street Branch as part of the mid-20th Century Civic Center. James Edward McClellan, Denver Markwith, Jr., and Jack Hunt MacDonald, developed site-cast, concrete tilt-up construction, during the post-World War II building boom in Southern California. This innovative method was considered novel at the time, as was the library's three-hinged arch structural system.

A handcrafted grandfather clock in the library's main room was donated by the senior class of Huntington Beach High School in 1914.

== Triangle Park ==
Triangle Park is a 1.11 acre neighborhood park that was created in 1912, three years after the City of Huntington Beach's incorporation in 1909. The park was remodeled from 1924-1925 and Canary Island palm trees were planted, which still stand today.

Triangle Park was used as a recreational area, prior to it officially being deeded to the city. The Park was associated with a baseball field (1912 to early 1930s); a tent city for oil workers (1921 to 1923); recreational activities like croquet and tennis (circa 1928 to 1930s); a putting green (1927 to circa 1950); and horseshoes (circa 1931).

In 1917, the Huntington Beach Company officially deeded land blocks #405 and #505 to the City, specifying public park uses for the deeded land.

A portion of Block 505, the future Triangle Park, was temporarily used for tents to house the constant flow of new residents to Huntington Beach upon the discovery of oil in 1920. The City of Huntington Beach City Clerk's office reports "on July 5, 1921, a lease contract was signed with R.E. Wright who constructed small beaverboard houses and rented them for $30 and $35 a month of which $8 a year went to the City. Bungalet Court, more commonly known as 'Cardboard Alley' was located on the triangular piece of land."

The incorporation of Triangle Park as part of a larger civic center complex was initiated in 1922, including the adjacent city hall (1922 to 1923); the Memorial Hall (1923); the Horseshoe Club (1931), which later provided space for a courthouse and city administrative offices: and the Huntington Beach Fire Department headquarters (1939). By the mid 1920s, the "triangular park" was seeded with grass, street lights were installed on Main Street, and the City began planting trees. In February 1925, the board of trustees (city council) discussed "with considerable interest" a resident suggestion "advocating the use of Block 505 for a recreation park, suggesting tennis, croquet, and handball courts as being a very desirable form of amusement." In 1927, the recreational improvements at Triangle Park were well underway, with the addition of a lighted baseball diamond, grandstand, and cement work on the horseshoe grounds.

The Huntington Beach Horseshoe Club House was constructed in 1931 on the north east corner of Triangle Park and used for community meetings until 1942. In 1933, Triangle Park was considered as a possible site for a federal post office, but later rejected when a downtown Huntington Beach parcel on Main Street was identified. The Pomona Public Library Frasher Foto Postcard Collection includes images of the horseshoe club, circa 1935. During World War II, the American Red Cross set up headquarters in the Horseshoe Club building, providing first aid and rolling bandages for the war effort.

The name, Triangle Park, was known locally but not officially adopted by the City of Huntington Beach until 2011, following a recommendation by the Parks Naming & Memorials Committee. A plaque was installed at the park to provide a historical summary for both the library and Triangle Park in 2013.
