= Buena Park Library District =

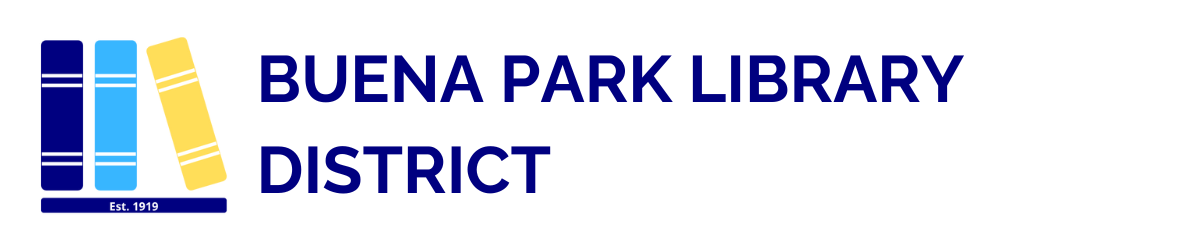

Special district overview
- Formed: 1919
- Headquarters: 7150 La Palma Ave, Buena Park, CA
- Special district executive: Helen Medina, Library Director
- Website: https://www.buenaparklibrary.org

The Buena Park Library District is a special district that provides library services in Buena Park. The district also oversees a small portion of unincorporated Orange County. It is one of two library districts in Orange County, the other being the Placentia Library District.

== History ==
The district began as a town library comprised primarily of donated books in 1905. Following an election in 1919, the Buena Park Library District was founded after petitioning from the Buena Park Women's Club. The need for library services in the area preceded the founding of the city of Buena Park, which was later incorporated in 1953.

Following having several locations, its current facility opened in 1969. The building was designed by William Pereira & Associates. The building underwent a $434,000 renovation to remove asbestos in 1987.

In 1994, the district conducted a study on whether to consolidate with either the city of Buena Park, become a dependent district of Buena Park, or merge with the Orange County Public Library. The study concluded that the potential consolidation options should be dismissed and the district should remain independent.

During the 1994 Orange County bankruptcy, a quarter of the district's budget was frozen due to being in the county's bankrupt investment pool. Trustees alleged the library director withheld financial information and filed a complaint with the Orange County Grand Jury.

Sometime between 2005 and 2023, and following Orange County LAFCO's 2005 Municipal Service Review and Sphere of Influence Study, the boundaries of the district changed to remove portions that were in the cities of Anaheim, Fullerton, and La Palma, each of which either have their own city library or are part of the county system. The boundaries were also expanded to include portions of the city of Buena Park which were not previously included within the district.

In 2020, the library discontinued the use of overdue fines.

== Governance ==
The Buena Park Library District is governed by a five-member Board of Trustees, each elected to a four-year term. Beginning in 2021, the Directors were elected by geographic district, rather than at-large, after being threatened by a lawsuit from the Mexican American Legal Defense and Educational Fund. The current members of the Board are:

Board Member	Division	Last election	Term ends
Carole Jensen	1	2024	2028
Brenda Estrada	2	2022	2026
Richard Rams	3	2022	2026
Christian Quintero	4	2024	2028
Vacant	5	N/A	2028
