= Placentia Library District =

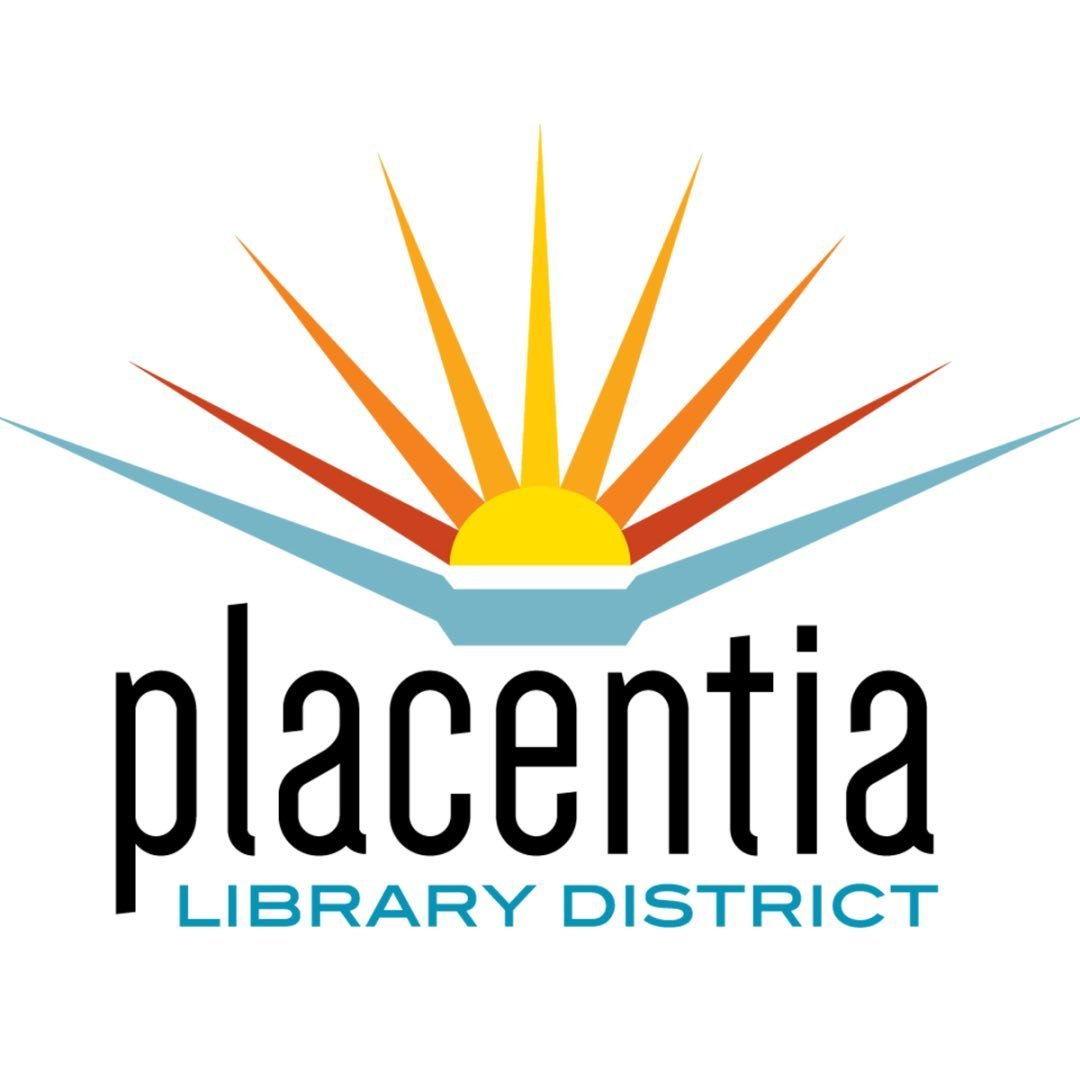

Special district overview
- Formed: September 2, 1919
- Headquarters: 411 E. Chapman Ave, Placentia, CA; 33°52′18″N 117°51′39″W
- Special district executive: Jeanette Contreras, Library Director
- Website: https://www.placentialibrary.org/

The Placentia Library District is an independent special district that provides library services in Placentia and nearby unincorporated areas and is governed by an elected board of trustees. It is one of two library districts in Orange County, the other being the Buena Park Library District.

== History ==
Beginning in 1914, the Woman's Christian Temperance Union established a reading and recreation room for boys in a storefront on Bradford Avenue. After a successful election, the district was officially formed on September 2, 1919. The formation of the district precedes the City of Placentia itself, which did not incorporate until 1926.

The new library district included seven square miles of the Placentia area: the north line was beyond Golden Avenue, the east line along Linda Vista through Hazard's subdivision, the south through Golden State Tract but not as far as Miraloma Avenue and the west line along the Fullerton boundary. The library board of trustees hired Placentia's first librarian, Sara Rideout, for $0.25 an hour, and the Women's Christian Temperance Union turned over their reading room and 193 books. The library officially opened to the public on January 15, 1920, from 2:00–5:00pm and 7:00–9:00pm.

By 1926, a new library building was needed to meet the needs of the growing community. The building, designed in the Spanish Colonial Revival style by renowned architect Carleton Monroe Winslow, features beautiful Talavera tiles created by Mexican potter Pedro Sanchez. In March 1927, the grand opening was held for the new library building located at 143 S. Bradford Avenue.

In 1972, the district and the city of Placentia formed the Placentia Civic Center Authority to issue $2.5 million in bonds to finance a new library, city hall, and police department. By 1974, the library again moved to its current location in the Civic Center Plaza. Author Ray Bradbury spoke at the library’s dedication presentation. The building later received a seismic upgrade in 2000.

1993 budget woes forced the district the reduce the number of hours and layoff employees. Library programs and local schools were also affected. The district also lost over a hundred thousand dollars in the 1994 Orange County bankruptcy. Measure W was a 1996 ballot measure proposing to increase property taxes to help fund the district. The measure failed, and the district subsequently cut staff and hours.

A consolidation study was initiated in 1994 to determine whether to remain independent, merge with the city of Placentia as either a city department or dependent special district, or merge with the Orange County Public Library. The study concluded the district should remain independent.

In 2005, the district was awarded the California Special District Association’s “Innovative Program Award” for its Placentia Library Literary Services program, a literacy program for children, adults, and families.

Today, the Placentia Library District has over 330,000 visitors annually, with over 42,000 library cards issued. The library holds over 102,000 materials. In September 2018, the Placentia Library began a major $2.3 million renovation/modernization project as part of the library's centennial anniversary. The project was completed on September 14, 2019.

== Governance ==
The Placentia Library District is governed by a five-member Board of Trustees, each elected to a four-year term by district. The current members of the Board are:

Board Member	District	Term began	Term ends
Nithin Jilla	1	2025	2028
Gayle Carline	2	2022	2026
Sherri Dahl	3	2024	2028
Stephanie Beverage	4	2024	2028
Scott Nelson	5	2022	2026
