= Tianguis Cultural del Chopo =

Mexican flea market

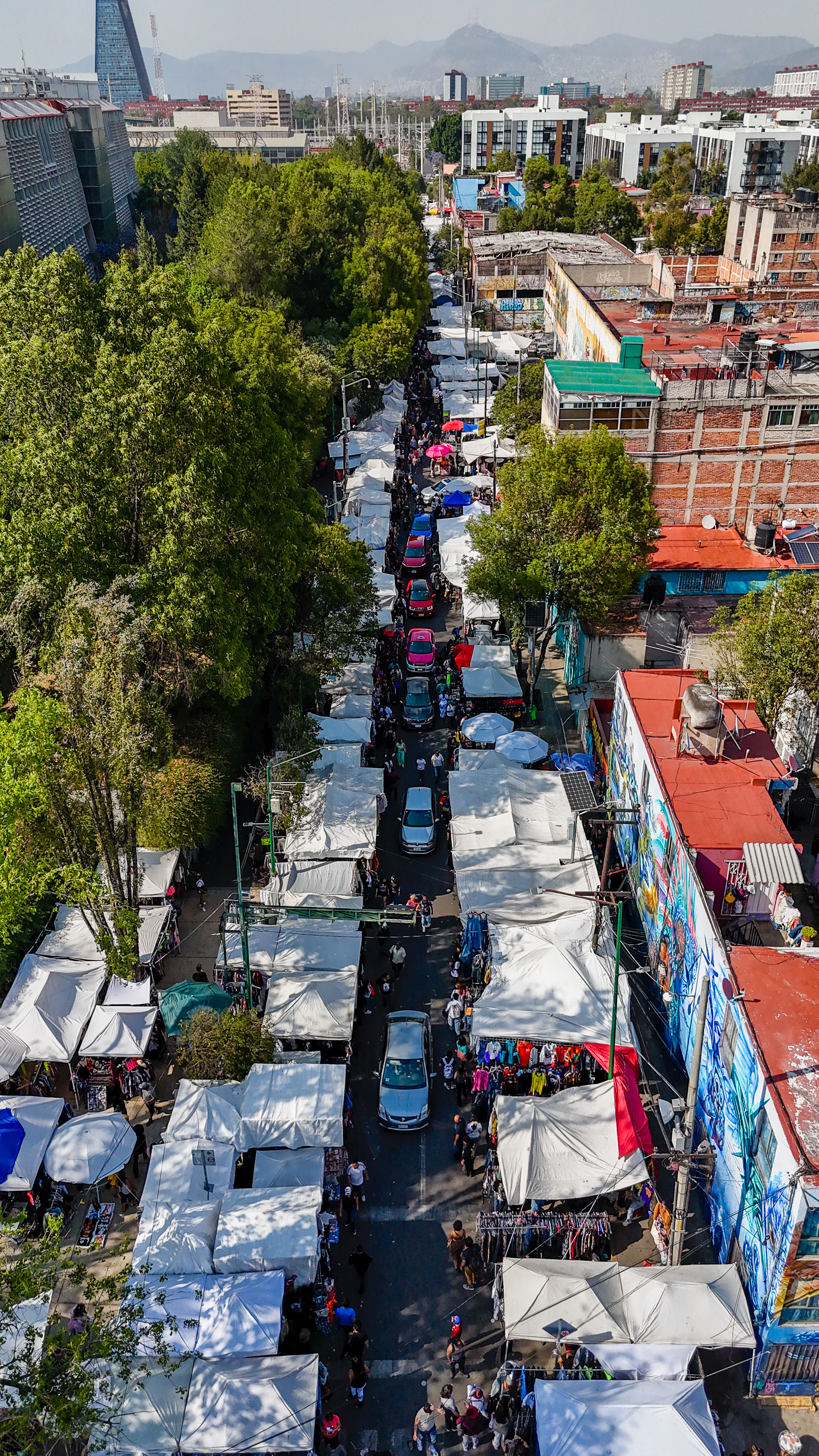
The market in 2025

The Tianguis Cultural del Chopo is a Saturday flea market (tianguis in Mexican Spanish) near downtown Mexico City, known locally as El Chopo. It is named after its original location which was near the Museo Universitario del Chopo, an Art Nouveau building with a couple of towers designed by Bruno Möhring. Depending on the affiliation one has with this event, it has been referred to as "The Punk Market", "The Metal Market", or "The Goth Market". Since the end of the 1980s, the Tianguis del Chopo has been located close to Metro Buenavista station on Aldama street, in the Colonia Guerrero neighborhood.

Originally, the Tianguis was a place for hippies to trade 1960s memorabilia including not only records but also clothing, magazines, books and other collectibles. Over time the Tianguis became a countercultural hub, becoming a meeting place for followers of different musical genres like metal, goth, punk, grunge and ska, among others. Almost always, some local and touring bands play live gigs at the back of the market where casual traders can be found, standing and looking out for rare collectibles, records or CDs. The market is a core site of the local alternative scene, home of the city's many subcultures.

On the northern end of the market, at the corner of Aldama and Camelia streets, is an area called Espacio Anarcho-punk. Vendors in this part of El Chopo sell mostly books, movies, and other materials that have an anarchist or radical perspective. Many of the Espacio Anarcho-Punk vendors contribute to a weekly zine of the same title addressing local social issues and radical politics.

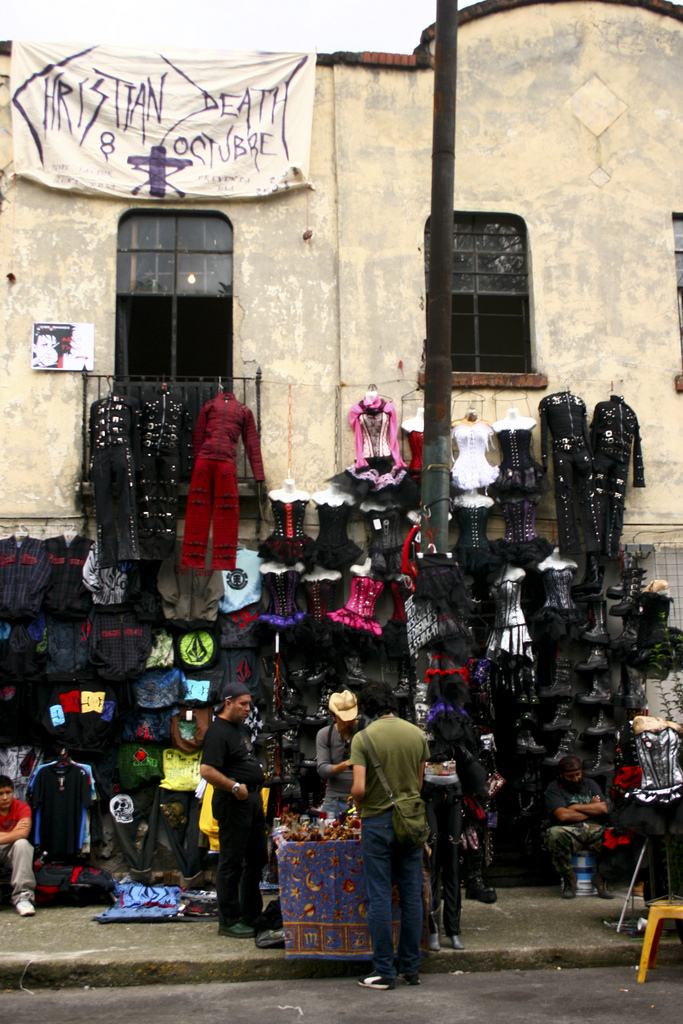
Clothes on sale

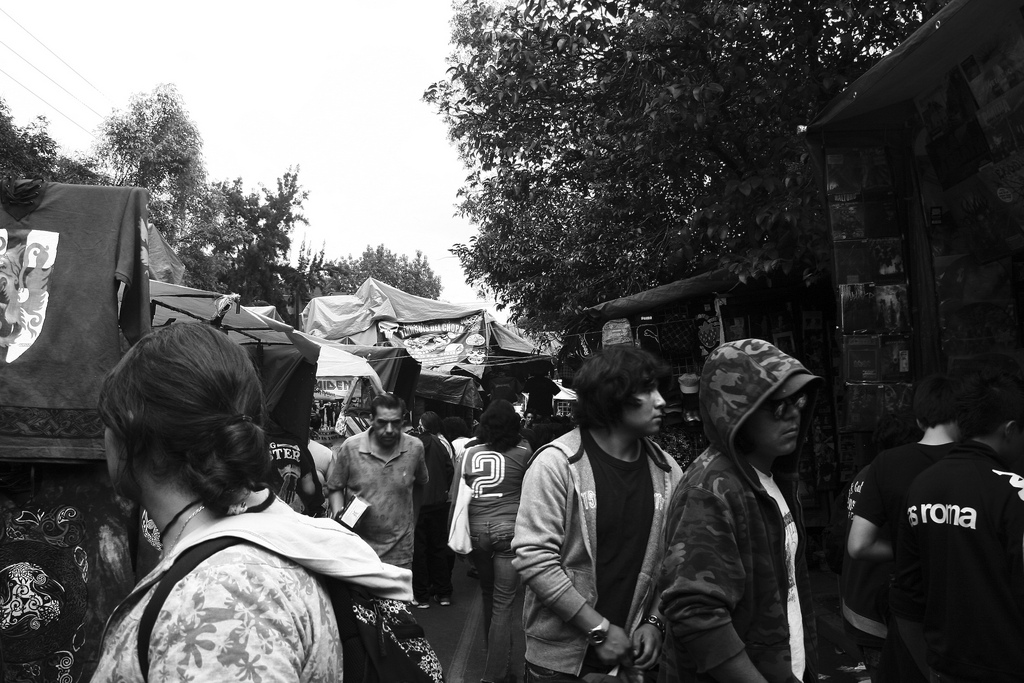
Chopo Fleamarket

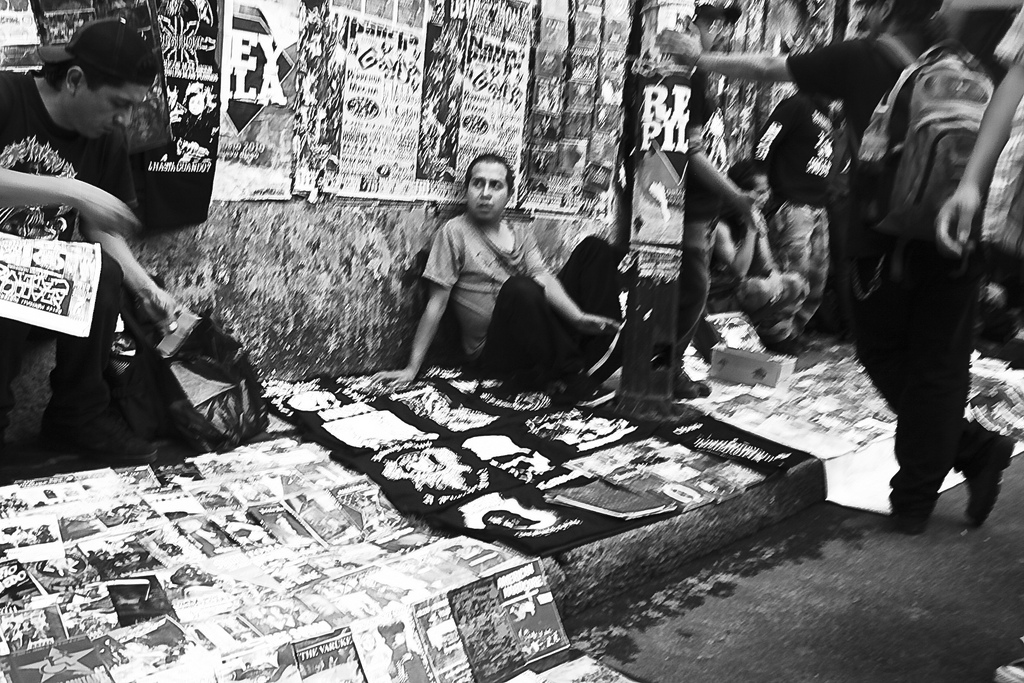
Records sale and exchange

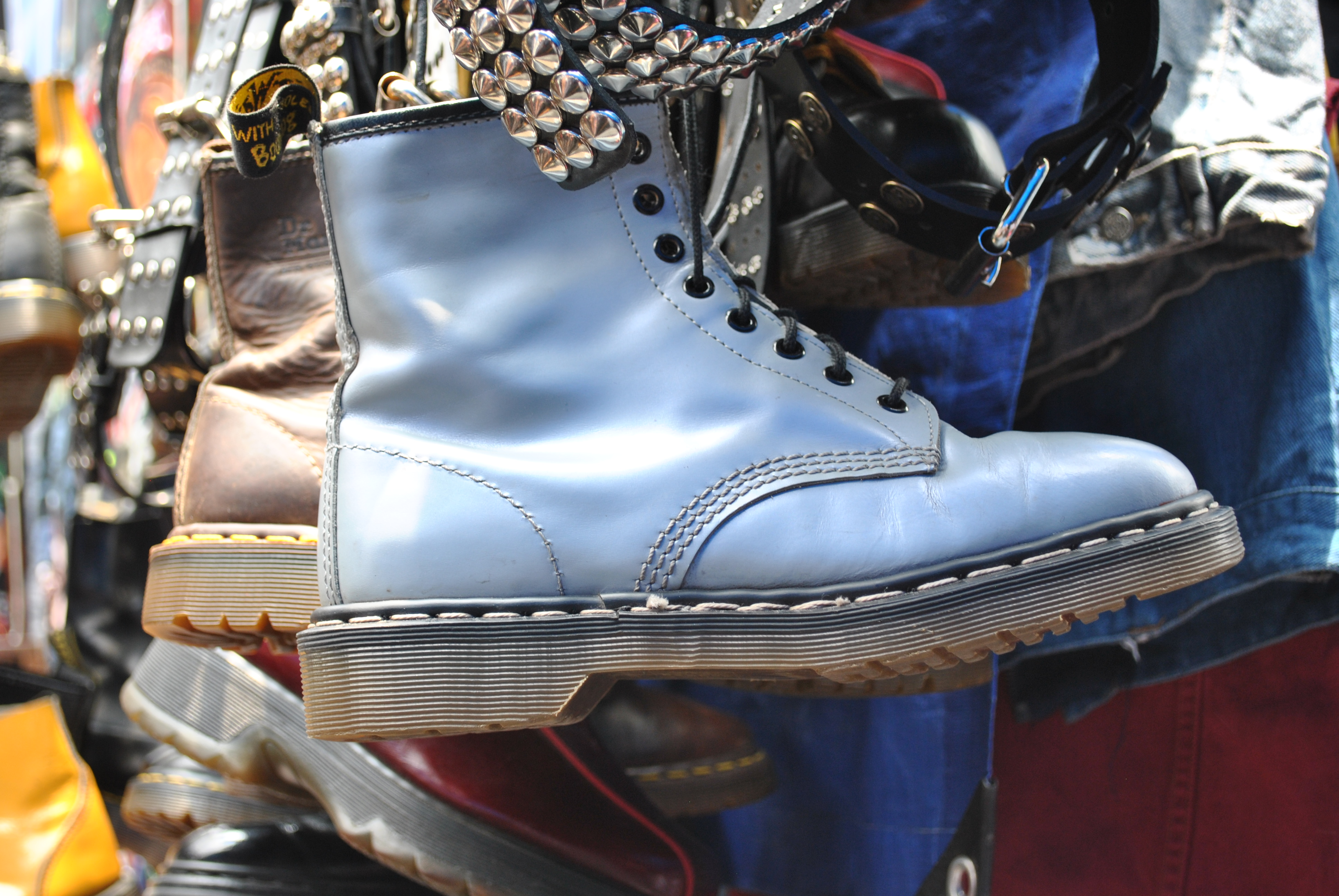
Shoes and leather goods, 30 July 2011
