= Huntington Beach Public Library =

Library system in California, US

Coordinates: 33°42′06″N 118°00′16″W

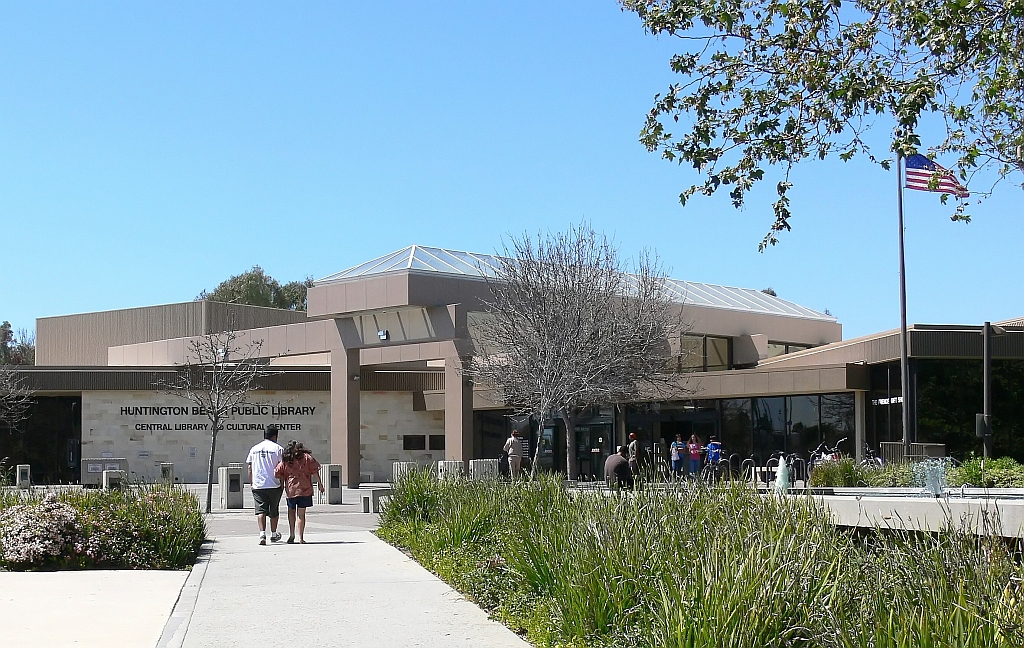
- The entrance of the Central Library and Cultural Center in 2008
- Location: Huntington Beach, California, United States
- Established: 1909
- Branches: 4

Access and use
- Circulation: 960,495
- Members: 123,838

Other information
- Director: Stephanie Beverage
- Website: hbpl.org

The Huntington Beach Public Library (HBPL) is a library system located in Huntington Beach, California. It offers online databases, print and electronic books and magazines, children's programs, computer lab, DVDs, CDs, and audiobooks for anyone with a Huntington Beach Library card. Library cards are free to California residents. Free wireless access is available at all locations without a card.

The library is financed and governed by the City of Huntington Beach, California. Volunteers also subsidize the library system by selling used books, operating a gift shop, and running charitable events. In 2015, volunteers donated 57,731 hours towards the library. The first library in Huntington Beach opened in 1909 and has since evolved to a five-location library system: Central, Main Street, Oak View, Helen Murphy, and Banning.

== Central Library and branches ==
The Central Library resides in a 350-acre (140 ha) park and features an open and light-filled floor plan, spacious reading decks, a public computer lab, and indoor fountains including a spiral ramp water feature. The Dion Neutra-designed facility opened in 1975 and was expanded by Huntington Beach architects Anthony and Langford in 1994. The Central library has seven meeting rooms available for rental to help support the library system. Local business and residents have held special events such as seminars, classes, weddings, auditions, jazz concerts and film festivals at the central location. Additionally, several community organizations use Central: Literacy Volunteers of America help adults learn to read; the Huntington Beach Art League hosts art shows; the Orange County, California Genealogical Society houses a depository of records; and the Huntington Beach Playhouse produces several shows a year in the library theater. The Central library is located at 7111 Talbert Ave. The size of the Central Library is 115,000 square feet (10,700 m^{2}) as of 2009.

=== Main Street Branch ===
Main Street Branch served as the city's main library from 1951 up until April 1975 when the Central Library was finished. The architectural firm of McLellan, MacDonald and Marcwith designed the modernist Main Street Branch. The building encompasses 9,034 square feet (839.3 m^{2}). At the time it was built it was part of the Civic Center. Located 5 blocks up from the Huntington Beach pier at 525 Main Street, this branch is a pleasant oasis in the heart of downtown Huntington Beach. In 2013 the Main Street Branch was listed on the National Register of Historic Places.

=== Oak View Branch ===
Oak View Branch Library is the newest branch library, having opened in 1995 on 17251 Oak Lane. Oak View is named for the adjacent Oak View elementary school and has a popular homework club program. The branch serves a largely Hispanic area of the city and offers a sizable Spanish language collection. The library is 4,300 square feet (400 m^{2}) in area.

=== Helen Murphy Branch ===
Helen Murphy Branch is the smallest branch library and is located in Marina Park, adjacent to Marina High School. The branch located on 15882 Graham Street, was renamed in memory of Helen Kathryn Murphy, a branch manager who worked for 23 years in library system. The library is 1,200 square feet (110 m^{2}) in area.

=== Banning Branch ===
This quaint branch in the southeast section of the city began as a former real estate sales office located on 9281 Banning Ave. The branch shares a parking lot with an elementary school and is a popular destination for students. The library is 2,024 square feet (188.0 m^{2}) in area.

=== Virtual branch ===
The library system offers many information services to home users via the Internet such as electronic databases and downloadable audiobooks and ebooks. From the convenience of home, library patrons have access to a wealth of authoritative factual information that is not freely available on the Internet. Students can obtain homework help, research newspaper and magazine articles, and search for historical pamphlets and clippings. Consumers can shop for the best rated products by reading Consumer Reports articles online. School children can access links to educational games and homework help sites without having to leave home. Buyers can purchase used books through the Friends of the Library's Amazon store.

== History ==
From the beginning the Huntington Beach Public Library has been an illustration of citizen concern for the community and its future generations.

=== 1908–09: Beginnings ===
Shortly before the city was incorporated February 1909, the possibility of opening a library was brought to the attention of the Board of Trade by two citizens, R. W. Blodgett and Mrs. R. H. Lindgren. Efforts of these two citizens aroused the interest of some local organizations and the Huntington Beach Women's Club called a mass meeting on February 15, 1909, to form a library association.

This meeting resulted in a temporary organization being established and Mrs. Blodgett was asked to draw up a constitution and by-laws for the new organization. The first board of trustees consisted of Mr. A. W. Everett, Mrs. C. D. Heartwell, Mrs. Mary Manske, Miss Alma Wilson and Mr. A. L. Reed. Each member of this board represented a different group or interest in the city. Once the Public Library Association was established, friends in the community began giving books and other necessary things and a home for the new library became a problem. The board decided to buy an old office building which was to be moved and Mr. Reed guaranteed payment of $50 for the roofless building. Mr. S. E. Hearn agreed to allow the board to move the building to a lot at the corner of Walnut Avenue and Main Street for a nominal rent charge. Community involvement in the new library was particularly noteworthy during this period. During the time the citizens and the library trustees were busy readying the new library the city was officially incorporated and a board of trustees, the forerunner of today's city council, was elected.

On June 14, 1909, the president of the Public Library Association, Mr. Everett, appeared before the city board and offered to turn over the library to the city. The subsequent agreement called for the city to set aside $300 for the immediate use of the library, to assume its debts and to support the library with tax funds. After Mr. Everett's appearance before the board, the city governing body enacted Ordinance 18, which established a public library. At this time, the city's board chairman, Ed Manning, appointed the first library board of trustees. Members of the first board were Mr. Everett, president; Mrs. Lindgren, secretary; Mrs. Manske; Mrs. Blodgett; and Ida Vincent.

Shortly after the city acquired the new library, Elizabeth Singleton and two assistant librarians from Long Beach came to the city and catalogued the books free of charge. Their lunches and traveling expenses were provided by the Library Board of Trustees. Edith Brown of Long Beach became the first city librarian in July, 1909. At that time there were 338 volumes in the library, 228 were gifts while 110 had been bought new. The new library subscribed to twelve magazines and held hours of 10 a.m. to noon and 2:00 p.m. to 7 p.m. In August, Mr. Hearn, owner of the property where the library was located, notified the Library Board that the library had to move by the end of the year.

=== 1910s: Improvements and expansion ===
In January 1911, the library was moved to the intersection of Walnut Avenue and 3rd Street.

Andrews was granted a leave of absence from her librarian's job in March 1911, and when she failed to return, Bertha Proctor was permanently appointed to take her place in May. At that time, the librarian's salary was $35 per month. During the next few months there were many improvements to the library building and its surroundings but it was becoming more apparent that the need for a permanent library building was surfacing. The Huntington Beach Company offered the city a site provided a $5,000 building was erected on the property. The Library Board began looking for the means to accomplish such an endeavor, but the project was temporarily abandoned when no funds could be located.

After some discussion, the Library Board decided to purchase four lots on the corner of Walnut Avenue and 8th Street at a cost of $1900. The Library Board was able to come up with all but $300, so the City Council provided the extra money and by May 1913, the city had acquired a site for the proposed library. Once the lots were clear and title was given to the city the Library Board in cooperation with the City Council, the Huntington Beach Women's Club and the Parent Teacher Association began gathering the necessary data to obtain a Carnegie Library building.

=== 1913 Carnegie Library ===

In February 1913, councilmen received notification of the $10,000 grant and they notified the Library Board to begin discussing plans for the new library. In August 1913, the Carnegie Corporation accepted the plans and W. D. Lambert of Long Beach received the contract. The cornerstone of the Carnegie Library was laid during a big ceremony. The history of the city, the library, names of all those who had served on the Library Board, city trustees, pastors of the churches, members of the Board of Trade, names of those who had served on the library staff, the name of each child in the schools and a small American flag were enclosed in the stone. In a little over four years the number of volumes in the library had risen from 328 volumes to 2800 volumes, 700 of which were donated by residents of the city. The main floor of the new Carnegie Library housed an adult reading room, a children's department and the librarian's office. The lecture room, a reference room and the furnace room were located downstairs. The Chamber of Commerce was located in the lecture room until 1921. In order to be more responsive to community needs the Library Board decided to establish a reading room at 205 Main Street. The reading room was used for a three-year period from 1928 until August 1931.

=== 1933: Earthquake damage ===
In March 1933, the Carnegie Library suffered considerable damage in the 1933 Long Beach earthquake which struck the area. The board authorized Catching Brothers Company to make the necessary repairs to the Carnegie building. 1934 saw the library lose its librarian of 23 years when Bertha Reynolds (formerly Proctor) resigned. She had seen the library grow from the small building at Walnut Avenue and 3rd Street to the Carnegie Building at Walnut Avenue and 8th Street, and now the library was outgrowing that facility. A preliminary set of plans was submitted to the Library Board by Architects McClelland, McDonald, and Markwith of Los Angeles, but the advent of World War II held up construction until 1949. Margaret Kemp served as temporary librarian until Floyd Jorgensen filled the job in 1937. When he left for the military, Lylyan Mossinger took over and served until 1959. On Friday, July 13, 1951, the Carnegie Library closed its doors after almost 40 years of service. When the doors closed, the library had a total of 42,000 volumes. On Sunday, September 30, 1951, the new library building at 525 Main Street was dedicated by Mayor Vernon Langenbeck. The library was built at a cost of $140,000. Members of the Library Board at the time of the dedication were Pearl M. Jones, president, Berta Tovatt, J. K. McDonald, Edith Vavra, and G. H. Hasson.

=== 1960s: The new Huntington Beach Library ===

The new Huntington Beach Library started its existence in 1967 when librarian Walter Johnson created a program citing the library needs for a growing community and the library board selected the Talbert Avenue site. The City Council then decided to place the library program on the ballot. The issue failed on the election held on November 5, 1968. With approximately 62 percent of the vote in favor of the library, however, the council decided to fund the project through the creation of a Public Facilities Corporation and created a five-man corporation for this purpose. The same body represented the city for the new Civic Center. Members are Dr. Dudley Boyce, Darrell Ward, Robert Polly, William Armstrong, and Larry Curran.

Library Board members, wanting a first hand view, toured libraries in California that had recently been constructed and were of similar size. The board developed a list of some 35 architects that they were interested in considering and eventually narrowed it down to 17 whom they invited in for interviews. Of the 17, the firm of Richard & Dion Neutra was asked to design the library. Shortly before the actual signing of the agreement, Richard Neutra died while on tour and his son, Dion, was retained to design the project.

The site had been selected because of its centralized location, both geographically and by population, and because of the natural beauty surrounding it. A 10-acre (40,000 m^{2}) plot of land was purchased for the site, including part of Talbert Lake, and the ground breaking ceremony took place on October 28, 1972.

=== 1980s–present: The Huntington Beach Public Library today ===
The Huntington Beach Public Library and Cultural Center has since experienced growth and expansion. The library increased its role as a vital community cultural center throughout the following two decades, and by the early 1990s plans were underway to expand its services. The City of Huntington Beach hired the architectural firm of Anthony & Langford to design what became a 43,000-square-foot (4,000 m^{2}) expansion. The Central library building was expanded to enclose an outdoor spiral ramp and fountain area. The new wing opened in 1994 and included a new Children's area with its own story time theater. The lower level featured five new meeting room, a catering kitchen, and a beautiful 319-seat theater. The library was also an early adopter of using an automated conveyor system to move books through the building.

Shortly after the Central library expansion, the Oak View Library branch opened to provide library services to the local Spanish-speaking community.

The late 1990s and early 2000s saw the emergence of a "virtual" branch when the library began offering a web-based catalog of its holdings and online reference databases. With help from the Bill and Melinda Gates Foundation, the library embraced the Information Age by providing computer labs with free Internet access. In 2005, a significant computer upgrade was completed which resulted in free Wi-Fi wireless Internet access, online renewals and reserves, and web-based used book sales. Starting in 2006, the Central library building underwent a phased refurbishment project which saw a return of the neutral brown and green color scheme that was originally envisioned by architect Dion Neutra.

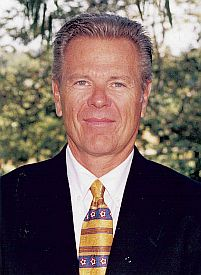
Ron Hayden

Ron Hayden served as Library Director from 1985 until 2008. Knowing that library funding was often precarious during lean budget years, he ensured the library's survival by establishing innovative revenue streams through development fees, media and room rentals, videoconferencing, and Friends of the Library used book sales. In 1992, Hayden was named Librarian of the Year by the California Library Association.

== See also ==
- Huntington Beach Independent
- Huntington Beach City School District
- Santiago Library System
