= Slim-fit pants =

Trousers tailored to fit very close to the body

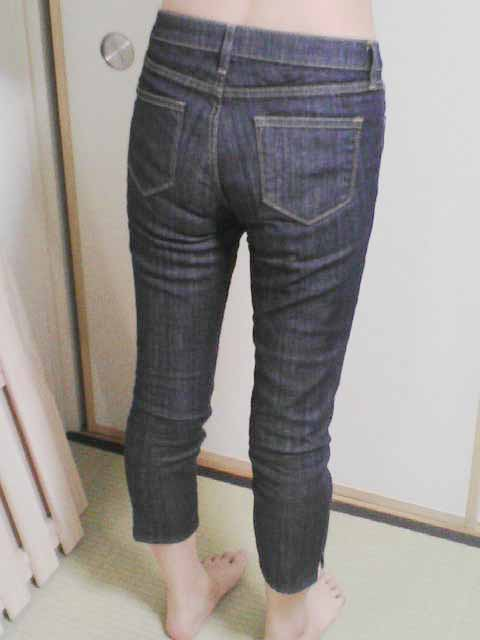
Women's skinny denim jean capri pants in 2008.

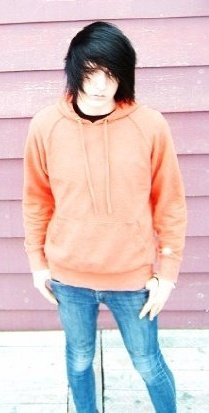
A man in the emo fashion wearing skinny jeans in 2009.

Slim-fit pants, slim jeans (when made of denim), or skinny jeans are tight trousers that have a snug fit through the legs and end in a small leg opening that can be anywhere from 9 to 20 inches (23 to 51 cm) in circumference, depending on size. Other names for this style include drainpipes, stovepipes, tight pants, cigarette pants, pencil pants, skinny pants, gas pipes, skinnies, and tight jeans.

Skinny pants taper completely at the bottom of the leg, whereas drainpipes are skinny but then the lower leg is straight instead of tapering and so they are often slightly baggier at the bottom of the leg than skinny jeans. In some very skinny styles, zippers are needed at the bottom of the leg to facilitate pulling them over the feet because the leg opening is so small. Stretch denim, with anywhere from 2% to 4% spandex, may be used to allow jeans to have a "super-slim fit". Skinny jeans come in a variety of colors and styles.

== History ==
=== Origins ===
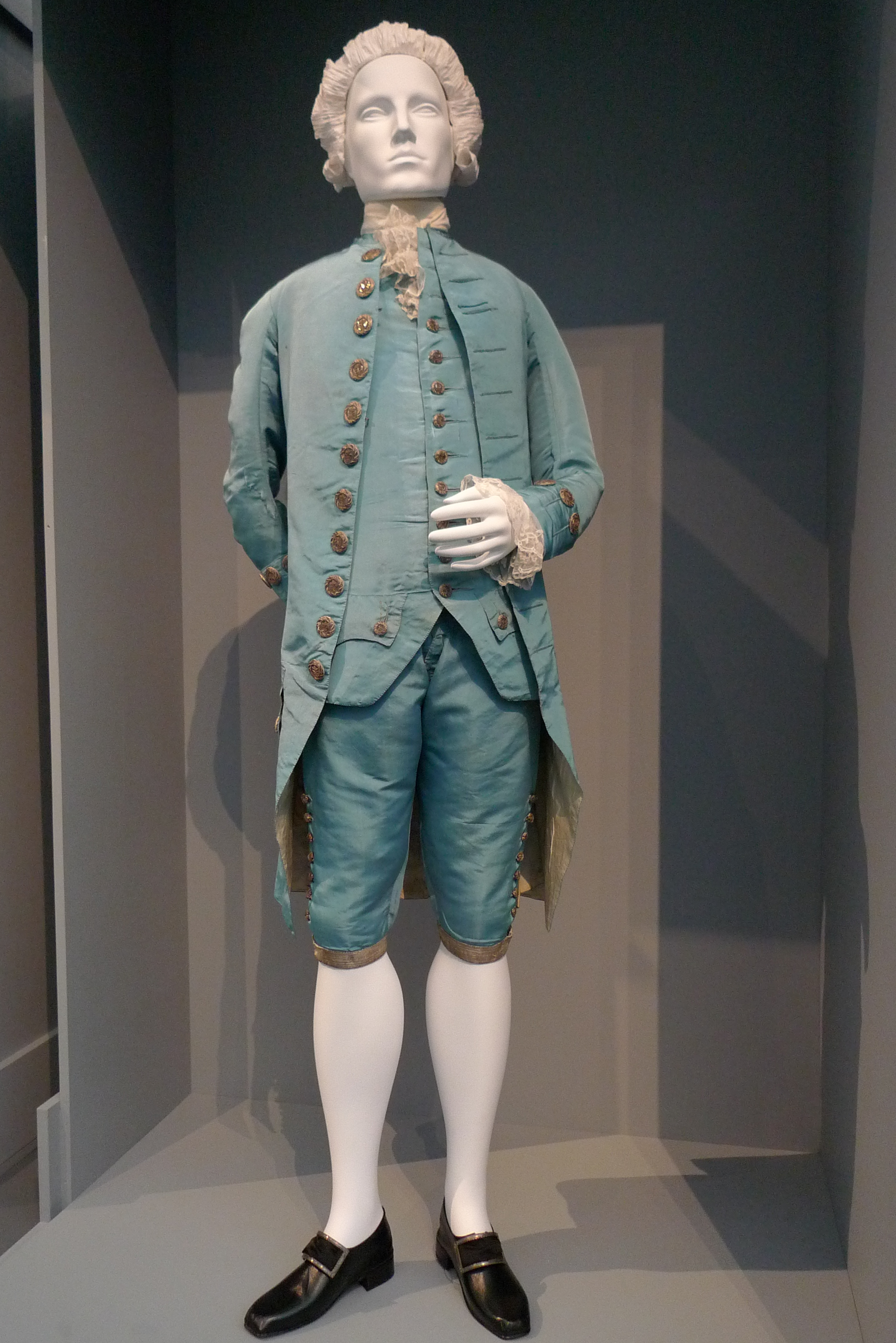
Tight-fitting breeches, as worn during the 17th and 18th centuries as part of the three piece suit

Before the 18th century, European men wore breeches and hose. In Tudor times, these breeches were loose-fitting, but by the 1660s, tight breeches were fashionable. These were popularised by Frenchmen at the court of Louis XIII, as part of the three piece suit that also included a type of frock coat called a Justacorps, a tricorne hat, a powdered wig, and a long waistcoat. During the Restoration era, the tighter breeches were introduced to England, and the rest of Europe, because the cut was deemed more flattering to the leg.

From the 16th until the 19th century, the Mughlai nobility attired themselves in tight-fitting churidars which were worn tied below the knee. These trousers, and other elements of traditional clothing like the shalwar kameez, were often worn by Englishmen working in India, especially officers of the East India Company.

=== The early 19th century ===
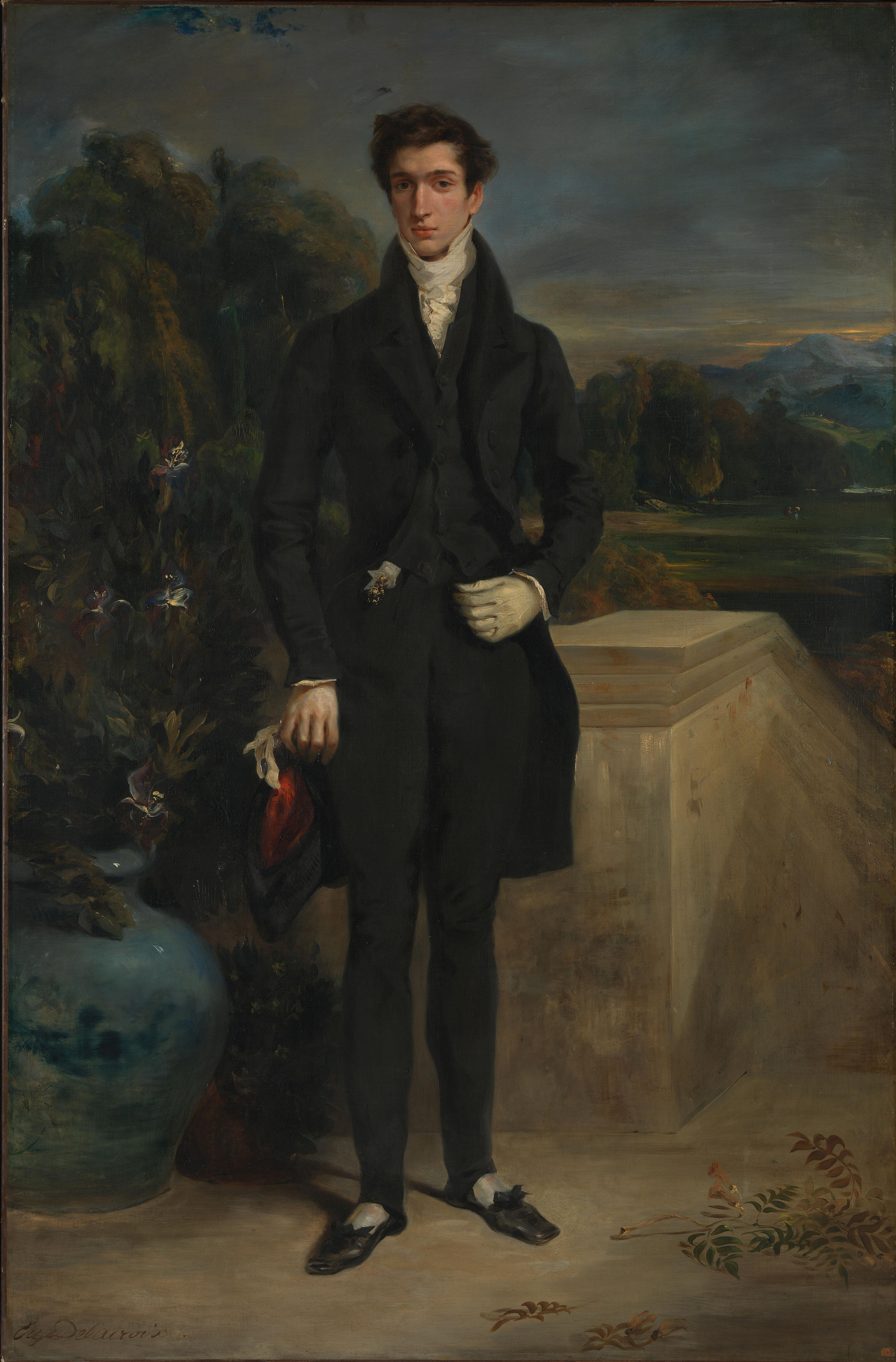
Regency era dandy wearing tailcoat and tight-fitting pantaloons

Tight-fitting trousers were fashionable from 1805 until 1850, being descended from the loose work trousers worn as a political statement by Sans-Culottes during the French Revolution. These "pantaloons," popularised by Regency era Englishmen such as Beau Brummell, were worn high on the waist and tailored to accentuate the leg like the breeches previously fashionable among the upper class. Pantaloons were tied (or buttoned) around the ankle and commonly put into boots.

=== Decline, 1890–1940 ===
Pants, which had come to mean tight-fitting trousers, but now just a synonym, fitted more loosely from the 1840s onwards as mass-production replaced tailoring. Beginning in the Edwardian era and continuing into the 1920s, baggy "Oxford" or "collegiate" trousers and plus fours were fashionable among the younger generation. As the name suggests, Oxford bags originated at the UK's elite universities, where young upper class men pursued an active, sports-centred lifestyle.

=== 1950s ===
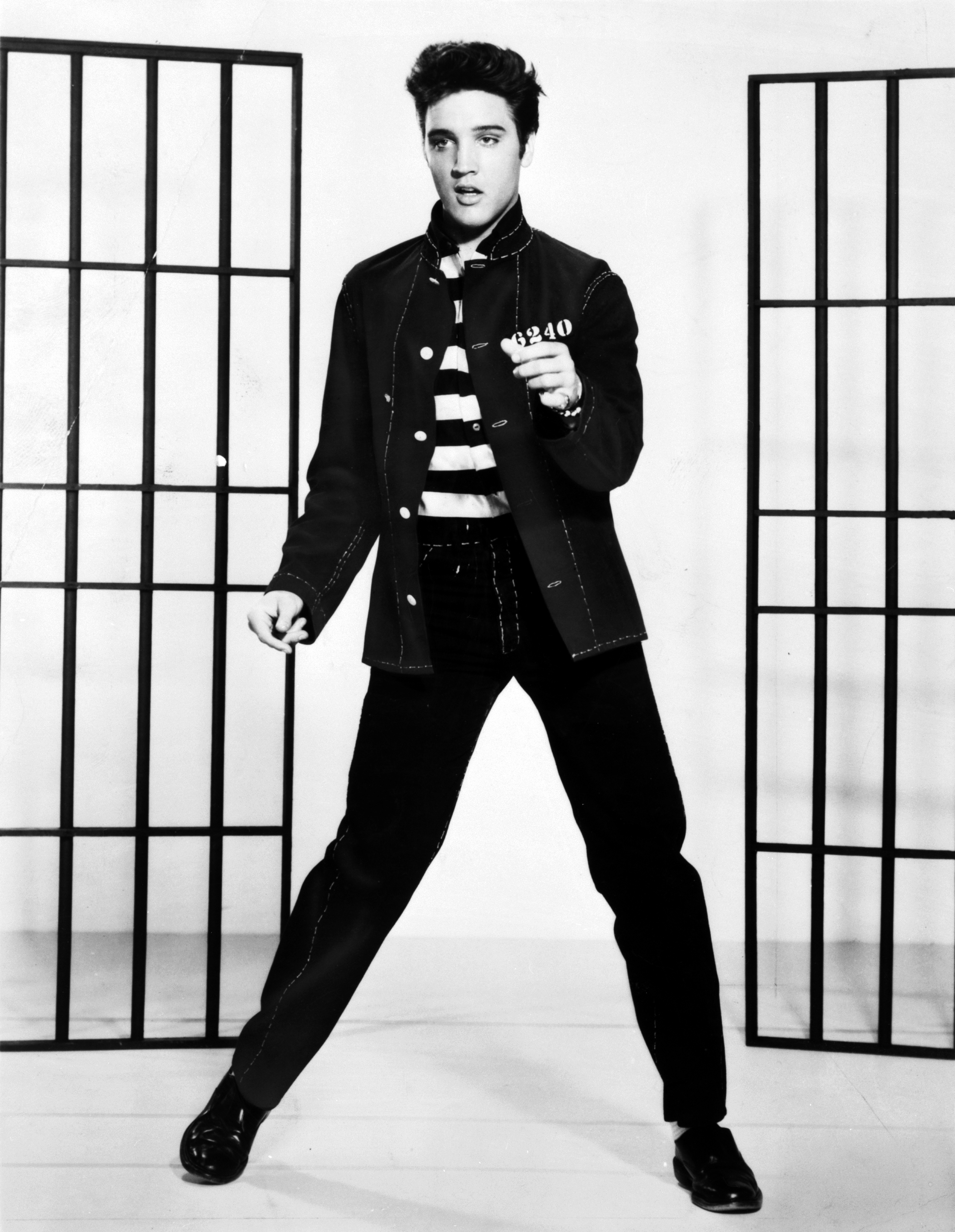
Elvis Presley wearing drainpipe jeans in the 1950s; the waist was higher than on modern skinny jeans.

Drainpipe trousers re-emerged in the 1950s, with popular Western stars such as the singing cowboy Roy Rogers, The Lone Ranger, The Cisco Kid, Zorro and Gene Autry and actresses Marilyn Monroe and Sandra Dee wearing their pants very slim to the ankle from 1955 onwards. Tapered jeans became most notable with country music stars and with the birth of rock and roll in the 1950s, when Elvis Presley donned slim-fitting jeans and shocked the country.

=== 1960s ===
In the early 1960s, drainpipes were worn by The Beatles, The Rolling Stones, Bob Dylan and other rock music acts. Fashion icon Audrey Hepburn also raised the popularity of drainpipe jeans. Slim fitting pants and jeans were worn not just by members of the teenage Mod or greaser subculture but also ordinary people. By 1962, Sears were selling tight jeans made from "stretch" denim that incorporated elastane. The trend lasted until the end of the 1960s when "hippie" culture gave rise to flared pants and bell bottom jeans.

=== 1970s ===
In the early 1970s, glam rock and rockabilly bands reviving the Teddy Boy look popularised drainpipe jeans in contrast to the flared trousers worn by hippies. Red tartan drainpipe jeans (as they were then called) were popular in the punk subculture of the late 1970s, and were worn by many bands and scene leaders such as Ramones, The Clash and Sex Pistols.

=== 1980s ===
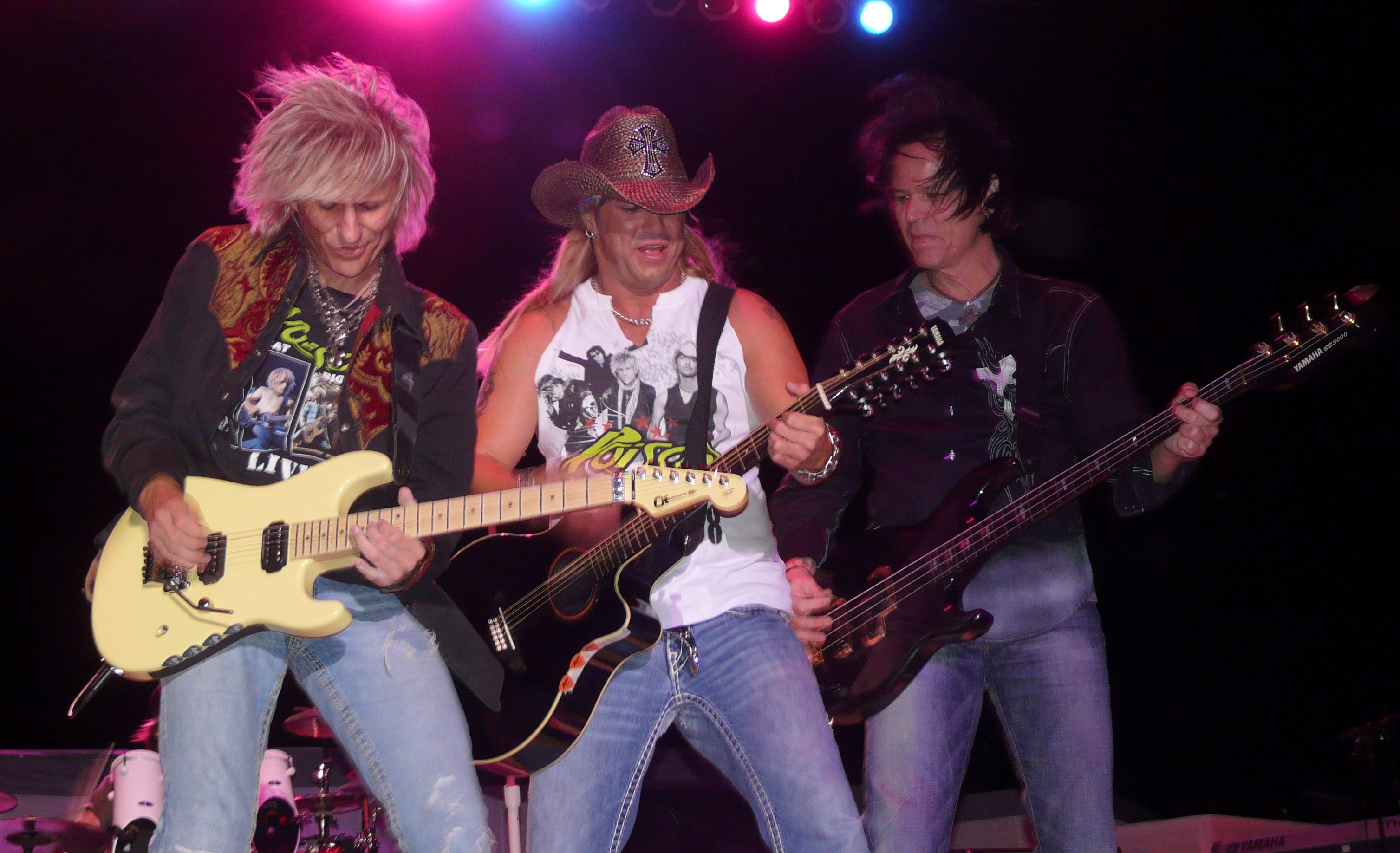
1980s glam metal band Poison wearing stonewashed drainpipe jeans

Skin-tight acid-washed jeans were also popular in the 1980s with most heavy metal bands, and in particular those in the thrash metal scene, such as Anthrax, Megadeth, Metallica and Slayer. This was the trend for those who did not wear spandex, which was popular with the dominant heavy metal scene at the time. They were often worn with white high-top sneakers or basketball shoes like Converse. By the late 1980s, drainpipe pants were largely superseded by straight leg jeans like Levi 501s, but remained popular among fans of hard rock until the 1990s. Tight-fitting jeans were also worn by pop stars like Michael Jackson and Freddie Mercury. The 1980s also saw the revival of "stretch jeans," pioneered and popularized in the United States by Steven Kohn and Sal Parasuco.

=== 1990s ===
By the early 1990s, many glam metal bands such as Poison, Mötley Crüe, Kiss, Bon Jovi, and Slaughter, abandoned spandex and wore form fitted jeans. Tight jeans were also worn by members of the casual subculture from the late 80s until the mid 90s, including Ewan McGregor in Trainspotting. However, with the rise of grunge and hip-hop music in the mid 1990s and the post thrash movement, drainpipe jeans quickly went out of fashion in favor of baggy carpenter jeans, as worn by hip-hop/rap acts such as Kris Kross, Another Bad Creation, and Snoop Dogg. Flared jeans also made a comeback from the mid-1990s onward, furthering the move away from the drainpipe styles.

=== 2000s ===
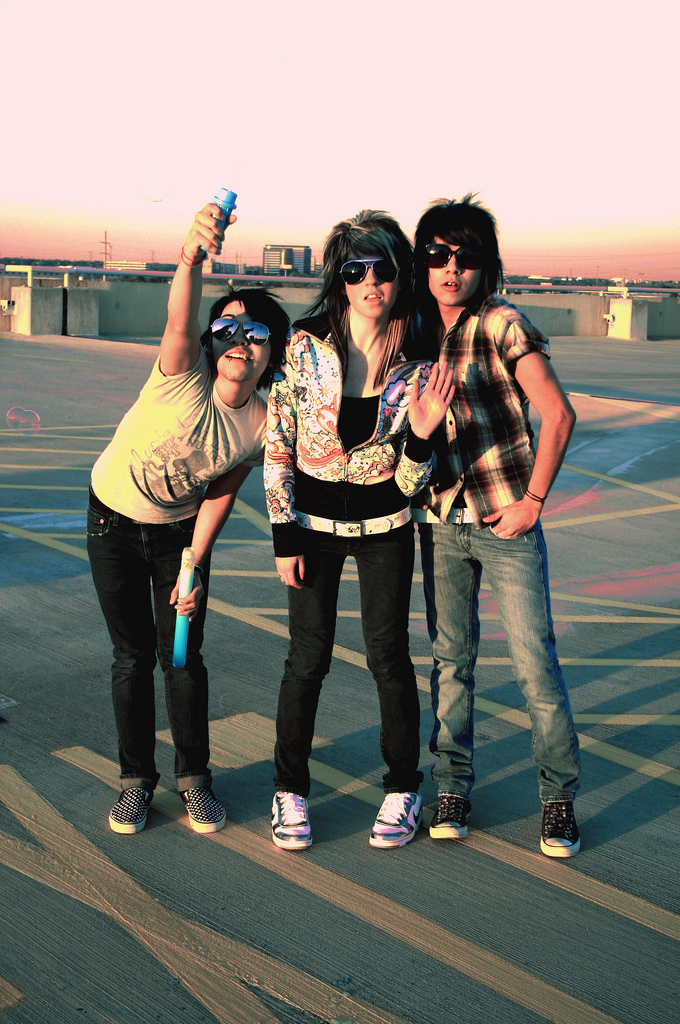
Scene kids wearing skinny jeans, late-2000s

The 2000s saw the continued rejection of slim-fitting pants and jeans throughout the early and middle years in mainstream fashion. However, in 2005, fitted pants were reintroduced to the mainstream market for women. This new style of pants was called "skinny jeans". During its first year, skinny jeans were only sold online, and they were not available in stores. Initially, they were not well received by the public, though there were some early adopters. It was not until 2006 that skinny jeans gained more steam in fashion world, and by this time skinny jeans were being sold at shopping malls. Throughout 2007 skinny jeans received more mainstream exposure as fashion trends started moving away from the bell bottoms and baggy pants which had been dominant for the previous 10 years. Men's skinny jeans were introduced in the late 2000s and became the norm by 2009.

=== 2010s and 2020s ===
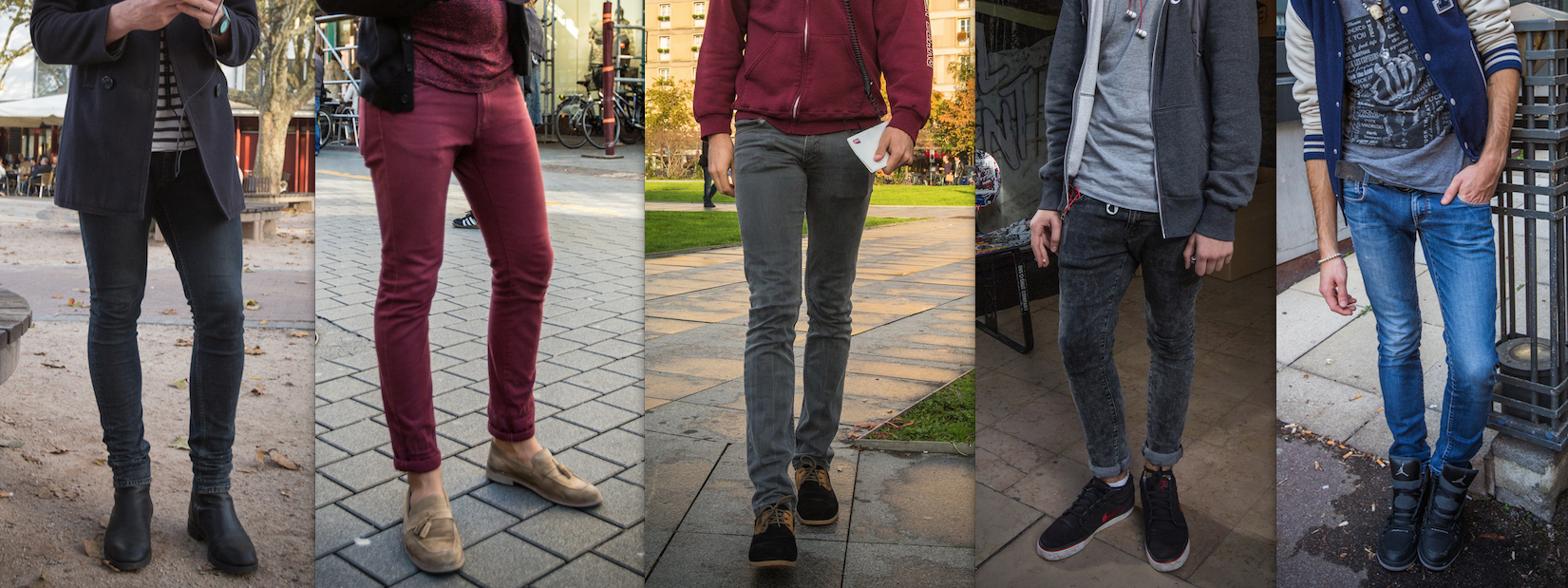
Skinny jeans for men, street style in Strasbourg, France, October 2013

Skinny jeans first spread to men's fashion in 2009. This has continued into the 2010s, entering the mainstream fashion in 2011. They eventually became one of the decade's defining fashion pieces for both men and women. Many men expanded their wardrobe to include tight-fitting chino trousers coming with variety of colors, but often in khaki, brown or white. Women's skinny jeans also came in various colors, often neutral colors like khaki and white. Starting in the mid-2010s, high-waisted women’s skinny jeans became stylish.

In the mid to late 2010s, skinny jeans peaked in popularity. Starting in the late 2010s, straight legged jeans would increase in popularity and lead to a steady decline in skinny jeans popularity. Stay-at-home orders during the COVID-19 pandemic accelerated a trend toward more comfortable, loose-fitting clothing and athleisure apparel.

== Medical problems ==
Victorian doctors theorised that tight trousers caused an outbreak of apoplexy in New York. However, the veracity of this claim is questionable, given the often speculative nature of early modern medicine.

In modern times, some physicians believe tight trousers may cause numbness due to compression of nerves. For example, this may affect the outer thigh in the condition meralgia paraesthetica.

A recent study by Korean doctors suggests that skinny jeans can cause varicose veins. Among men, tight trousers may also cause dyspermia due to overheating of the testes.

A study in 2015 documented the case of skinny jeans causing rhabdomyolysis, bilateral peroneal and tibial neuropathies.

== Bans and violence ==
Some opposers of skinny or tight pants believe that they are immoral, immodest, overtly sexual, or a threat to local traditions. In conservative regions of the Southern United States and some other western countries, like Russia, it was often linked to homosexuality as of the 2000s.

A number of schools around the world have banned students from wearing overly slim pants like "skinny jeans". In the United States, the ban in Brigham Young University–Idaho caught the attention of mainstream media in 2011; the ban was lifted in that college the same year. In one case, a student was banned from taking an exam for wearing skinny jeans. In India some colleges have advised against or prohibited tight pants for female students, citing their own safety. In Tanzania it was reported a female parliament member was asked to leave the parliament for wearing "skin-tight pants", with the parliament speaker calling it 'non-parliamentary attire'. There have also been reported incidents in the world of court defendants being turned away for wearing such "unappropriate" slim pants. Female police officers in Mexico have reported becoming victims of sexism for outfits which included tight pants.

In the 2010s, several religious fundamentalist governments, especially radical Islamists, disapproved of tight trousers. In Saudi Arabia, the police were reportedly instructed to arrest teenagers who dress this way because the tight jeans are seen as un-Islamic and, when worn by men, a sign of homosexuality. In the Gaza Strip, Palestinian youths caught wearing skinny jeans have been arrested and beaten by the Hamas police. Incidents of wearers being imprisoned or fined have been reported in places including Sudan and in territories that were controlled by ISIL in 2015. In Israel, a number of Rabbis signed a decree prohibiting devout Jewish men from wearing tight pants.

Some people wearing them have been met with violence, such as in 2012 when unknown individuals murdered between twelve and one hundred people in Iraq—among them were "emos" of both sexes wearing tight clothes and emo hairstyles. There has also been a case in the Democratic Republic of the Congo where security officers attacked a number of women who were wearing tight pants.

Since the Cold War, many Communist dictatorships have disapproved of skinny jeans. In Russia, they were associated with anticommunist juvenile delinquents like the Stilyagi beatniks during the 1950s or the so-called "hairies" during the 1960s. In Cuba during the late 2010s and early 2020s, law enforcement have used tight pants as a marker for male homosexuality in the context of arresting. In May 2021, North Korea banned "skinny jeans" and a number of other fashion items for its citizens, citing it as "capitalistic".

== See also ==
- 2000s in fashion
- 2010s in fashion
- Bell-bottoms
- Breeches
- Hose (clothing)
- Jeggings
- Tights
- Wide-leg jeans
