= Free Media Awards =

Award for achievements in journalism

- Awarded for: Independent journalistic works
- Sponsored by: ZEIT-Stiftung and Fritt Ord (organization)
- Country: Presenters: Germany, Norway; Recipients: Eastern Europe
- Presented by: ZEIT-Stiftung and Fritt Ord (organization)
- Formerly called: Gerd Bucerius Prize Free Press of Eastern Europe
- Reward: 15,000 EUR per recipient
- First award: 2000
- Website: frittord.no/en/prizes/free-media-awards

Free Media Awards (formerly: Gerd Bucerius Prize for Free Press in Eastern Europe, German: Gerd Bucerius-Förderpreis Freie Presse Osteuropas) is the press prizes awarded by the two foundations The Fritt Ord Foundation and the ZEIT-Stiftung.

== History and prize consideration ==
The prize was launched in 2000 by the ZEIT Foundation and was called the Gerd Bucerius Press Prizes for Eastern Europe (German: Gerd Bucerius-Förderpreis Freie Presse Osteuropas). The prize is named after the German politician and journalist Gerd Bucerius. In 2004, after the ZEIT Foundation began cooperation with the organisation Freedom of Expression Foundation (Fritt Ord), the prize was presented jointly.

The prize is awarded to journalists and media in Eastern Europe, who are distinguished by their quality, professionalism and civil courage. Organisations consider nominations after consultation with external experts. Each year, an independent jury selects the winners based on these nominations. Three to five awards are awarded per year.

== Jury ==
- Alice Bota — Polish-German journalist and writer
- Ane Tusvik Bonde — Norwegian senior advisor at the Human Rights House Foundation
- Juri Durkot — Ukrainian journalist and translator
- Guri Norstrøm — Norwegian journalist, NRK correspondent
- Martin Paulsen — Eastern Europe expert from the University of Bergen
- Silvia Stöber — German journalist specialising on Eastern Europe, South Caucasus and Central Asia

== Laureates ==
=== 2000 ===
- Brestskiy Kurier — Belarusian newspaper
- Königsberger Express — Russian newspaper in the German language
- Veidas — Lithuanian news magazine
- Veronika Koutsyllo — Russian journalist based in Moscow

=== 2001 ===
- Zerkalo Nedeli — Ukrainian newspaper
- Asya Tretyuk (Russian: Ася Третюк) — Belarusian journalist
- Belorusskaya Delovaya Gazeta — Belarusian newspaper
- Obshaya gazeta — Russian newspaper

=== 2002 ===
- Novaya Gazeta — Russian newspaper
- Vysoky Zamok — Ukrainian newspaper
- Narodnaja Volya — Belarusian newspaper
- Sega — Bulgarian newspaper
- Cristian Tudor Popescu — Romanian journalist

=== 2003 ===
- Svobodny kurs — Russian newspaper
- Ekspres — Ukrainian newspaper
- Belorusy i rynok (back in 2003 called "Belorusskiy Rynok" Russian: Белорусский рынок) — Belarusian newspaper
- Mikola Markevich (Russian: Николай Маркевич) — Belarusian journalist

=== 2004 ===
- Nevskoe vremya — Russian newspaper
- Zvezda — Russian newspaper
- Molodoy Bukovynets — Ukrainian newspaper
- Intex-Press — Belarusian newspaper
- 24 saati (Georgian: 24 საათი) — Georgian newspaper
- Yulia Latynina — Russian journalist and writer
- Svetlana Kalinkina — Belarusian journalist

=== 2005 ===
- The New Times — Russian magazine
- Chechenskoye obshchestvo (Russian: Чеченское общество) — Russian newspaper
- BelaPAN — Belarusian news agency
- Vitebskiy Kurier — Belarusian newspaper
- Resonansi — Georgian newspaper
- Semyon Novoprudsky (Russian: Семен Новопрудский) — Russian journalist

=== 2006 ===
- Salidarnasć (Belarusian: Салідарнасць, lit. 'Solidarity') — Belarusian newspaper
- Russian-Chechen news agency — Russian news agency (now Finland-based)
- Sovetskaya Kalmykiya segodnya (Russian: Советская Калмыкия сегодня) — Russian newspaper
- Vyborgskie Vedomosti (Russian: Выборгские Ведомости) — Russian newspaper
- Fatima Tlisova — Russian journalist of Circassian origin
- Veronika Shahova (Russian: Вероника Шахова) — Russian journalist
- Ukrayinska Pravda — Ukrainian newspaper

=== 2007 ===
- Natalia Novozhilova (Russian: Наталья Новожилова) — Russian journalist
- Inform Polis (Russian: Информ Полис) — Russian newspaper
- Caucasian Knot — Russian news portal
- TURAN — Azerbaijani news agency
- Nasha Niva — Belarusian newspaper
- CDMAG or CDMag — Belarusian media project

=== 2008 ===
- The New Times — Russian magazine
- Moy gorod bez tsenzury (Russian: Мой город без цензуры, lit. 'My city without censorship') — Russian weekly newspaper
- Victoria Ivleva — Russian photojournalist and correspondent
- Elena Larionova (Russian: Елена Ларионова) — Russian journalist
- Hazeta Slonimskaya — Belarusian newspaper
- Yezhednevnik (Russian: Ежедневник, lit. 'Diary') — Belarusian online portal
- Rauf Mirgadirov — Azerbaijani journalist

=== 2009 ===
- Roman Shleinov — Russian journalist of the newspaper Novaya Gazeta
- Zoya Svetova — Russian journalist based in Moscow
- Novy Chas — newspaper of the city of Minsk, Belarus
- Batumelebi — Georgian weekly newspaper
- Marianna Grigoryan — freelance Armenian journalist
- Azadliq — Azerbaijani daily newspaper
- Natik Javadli — journalist of the newspaper Bizim Yol

=== 2010 ===
- Mikhail Beketov — journalist of the newspaper Khimkinskaya Pravda (Russian: Химкинская правда)
- Arsenyevskiye Vesti — the newspaper of the city of Vladivostok, Russia
- Borisovskie novosti (Russian: Борисовские новости) — newspaper of the city of Barysaw, Belarus
- Liberali — Georgian magazine
- Shahvalad Chobanoglu — Azerbaijani journalist
- ANTV — Azerbaijani network television
- Edik Baghdasaryan — Armenian journalist

=== 2011 ===
- Chernovik — Dagestan weekly newspaper
- Natalya Ivanishina — journalist of the newspaper Ust-Ilimskaya Pravda (Russian: Усть-Илимская правда)
- Marina Koktysh — journalist of the newspaper Narodnaya Volya
- Natalya Ligacheva — journalist of the Internet media Telekritika
- Zamin Haji — Azerbaijani journalist
- A1plus — Armenian news portal

=== 2012 ===
- Olga Romanova — blogger on Echo of Moscow and columnist for The New Times
- Dosh magazine — Caucasian independent magazine
- Valery Karbalevich — editor-in-chief of the Gramadzyanskaya Alternative magazine and leading columnist for the Svobodnye novosti plus newspaper
- The Ukrainian Week magazine
- Khadija Ismayilova — Azerbaijani journalist

=== 2013 ===
- Elena Kostyuchenko — special correspondent of the information department of Novaya Gazeta
- Alexander Golts — chief editor of the Daily Journal online portal
- Yakutsk Vecherniy — socio-political weekly newspaper
- Serhiy Leshchenko — Ukrainian political journalist
- Tamina Taghizade — Azerbaijani journalist
- Mehman Huseynov — Azerbaijani journalist

=== 2014 ===
- Maria Eismont — Russian journalist
- TV Rain — Russian independent channel
- Tetiana Chornovol — Ukrainian journalist
- Yulia Mostovaya — Ukrainian journalist
- Mustafa Nayyem — Ukrainian journalist
- Alexander Klaskovsky (Russian: Александр Класковский) — Belarusian journalist
- Objective TV — Azerbaijani internet channel
- Epress.am — Armenian news portal

=== 2015 ===
- Netgazeti — Georgian news portal
- Serhiy Harmash — Ukrainian journalist and editor-in-chief of the online newspaper Ostro V
- Slidstvo.Info — Ukrainian news agency
- Valentyna Samar — Ukrainian journalist
- Pskov province — Russian regional socio-political newspaper
- Galina Timchenko — Russian journalist, editor-in-chief and the founder of the Meduza newspaper

=== 2016 ===
- Nashi Groshi (Our Money) — Ukrainian website
- Elena Milashina — Russian journalist
- Seymur Hazi — Azerbaijani editor and commentator

=== 2017 ===
- Sergei Jolkin — Russian caricature artist
- Anton Naumlyuk — Russian journalist
- Zaruhi Mejlumyan — Armenian journalist
- Meydan TV — Azerbaijani media organisation

=== 2018 ===
- Belarusian Partisan — Belarusian newspaper
- Fontanka — Russian newspaper
- Chai Khana — Georgian media platform

=== 2019 ===
- The Insider — Russian online newspaper
- Novoye Vremya — Ukrainian magazine
- Hafiz Babali — Azerbaijani journalist
- CivilNet — Armenian media platform
- 7x7 — Russian regional online newspaper and blog

=== 2020 ===
- MediaZona — Russian media outlet
- Proekt — Russian media outlet
- Aziz Karimov — Azerbaijani journalist
- Stanislav Aseyev — Ukrainian journalist
- Schemes (Ukrainian: Схеми) — broadcast on Ukrainian television

=== 2021 ===
- Katsiaryna Barysevich – Belarusian journalist of TUT.BY
- Katsyaryna Andreeva – Belarusian journalist of Belsat TV
- Darya Chultsova – Belarusian journalist of Belsat TV
- Natallia Lubneuskaya – Belarusian journalist of Nasha Niva
- TUT.BY – Belarusian media outlet
- Belarusian Association of Journalists

=== 2022 ===
- Mstyslav Chernov - Ukrainian photographer
- Yevgeniy Maloletka - Ukrainian photographer
- Nataliya Gumenyuk - Ukrainian journalist and author
- Andriy Dubchak - Ukrainian photo and video reporter
- Vladyslav Yesypenko - Ukrainian journalist and political prisoner on Russian-occupied Crimea
- Zaborona - Ukrainian online newspaper

=== 2023 ===
- Sevgil Musayeva
- OC Media
- Reform.by
- iStories

=== 2024 ===
- Bihus.Info
- Abzas Media
- Larisa Shchiryakova
- Mikhail Afanasiev

=== 2025 ===
- Mzia Amaglobeli
- Direkt36
- Belarusian Investigative Center
- Nargiz Absalamova
