= Mucu =

Mucu may refer to:

- Muçu, Azerbaijan
- Mücü, Azerbaijan
- MUCU, the ICAO airport code of Antonio Maceo Airport, in Santiago de Cuba
