= Mücühəftəran =

- Municipality
- Location within Azerbaijan
- Coordinates: 40°48′05″N 48°03′00″E
- Country: Azerbaijan
- Rayon: Ismailli

Population
  - Total: 255
- Time zone: UTC+4 (AZT)
  - Summer (DST): UTC+5 (AZT)

Mücühəftəran (also, Myudzhukhefteran, Myudzhyugaftaran, and Myudzhyukhefteran) is a village and municipality in the Ismailli Rayon of Azerbaijan. It has a population of 255. The village was created by the civilians of the Mücü village fleeing during the turbulent events of the Caucasus region following World War I. They moved closer to another nearby Jewish community called Haftaran, creating the modern name of the village.

A cemetery in the village shows that civilians did live in the area before the people from Mücu and Haftaran arrived. A synagogue once stood in the village but burned during Soviet rule.
