= Elton Guliyev =

Azerbaijani human rights lawyer

- Elton Quliyev
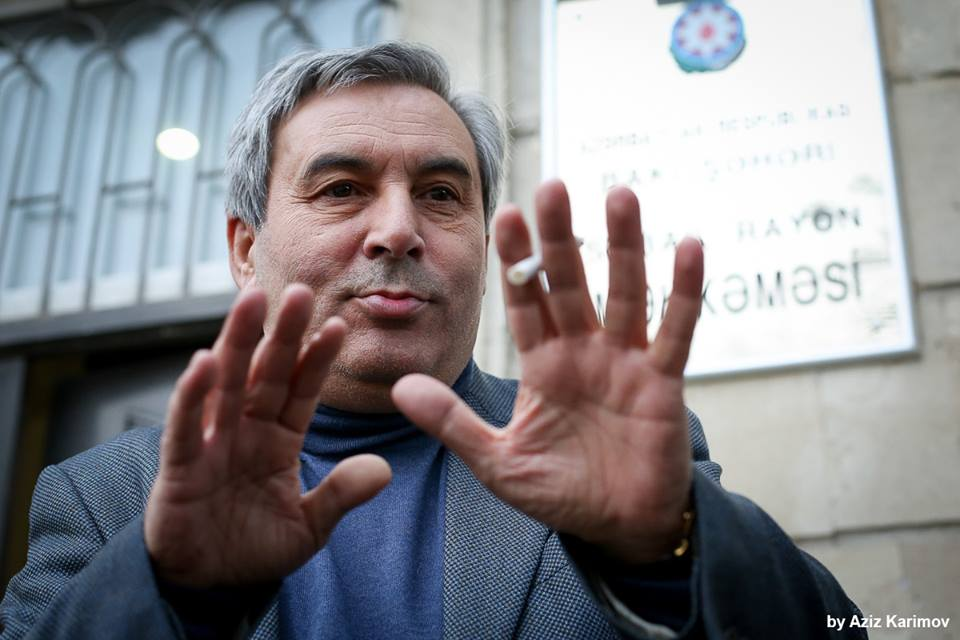
- Elton Guliyev in February 2015
- Born: February 28, 1956; Aghdam, Azerbaijan SSR
- Died: December 16, 2015 (aged 59); Baku, Azerbaijan
- Education: Baku State University
- Occupations: lawyer, human rights defender
- Years active: 1996–2015

Elton Rasim oglu Guliyev (Azerbaijani: Elton Rasim oğlu Quliyev; February 28, 1956, Aghdam, Azerbaijan SSR — December 16, 2015, Baku, Azerbaijan) was an Azerbaijani lawyer. From 1996 onward, he practiced law and defended the rights of many political prisoners and “prisoners of conscience”.

== Biography ==
Elton Rasim oglu Guliyev was born on February 28, 1956, in the city of Aghdam.

In 1962–63, he studied at secondary school No. 1 in Aghdam, and from 1963 to 1972 at secondary school No. 190 in Baku.

In 1972, he entered the law faculty of Azerbaijan State University named after S. Kirov and graduated in 1977.

From 1977, he was assigned to work in the internal affairs bodies. Between 1977 and 1991, he worked as an investigator, senior investigator, head of an investigative department, and deputy head of an investigative department in the Baku City Department of Internal Affairs and the Ministry of Internal Affairs of the Azerbaijan SSR.

In 1991, he voluntarily left the internal affairs bodies and continued working in his professional field.

From 1996 onward, he worked as a lawyer and was a member of the Azerbaijan Bar Association.

Elton Guliyev defended the rights of a number of political prisoners, including former minister of defense Rahim Gaziyev; war veterans, including Akif Nagi, chairman of the Qarabağ Liberation Organization; the murdered journalist Elmar Huseynov, editor-in-chief of Monitor magazine; blogger Emin Milli; youth activist Nigar Yagublu; activists of the NIDA Civic Movement; journalist Seymur Hazi, a staff member of the newspaper Azadlıq; human rights defender Intigam Aliyev; investigative journalist Khadija Ismayil; as well as former minister of economic development Farhad Aliyev.

He died on December 16, 2015, after a prolonged illness. He was buried the same day at Yasamal cemetery.

He was married and had two children.
