= Königsberger Express =

Russian German-language newspaper

- Nachrichten aus Kaliningrad
- Type: Monthly newspaper
- Founder: Igor Zarembo
- Editor-in-chief: Elena Lebedeva
- Founded: May 1993
- Language: German
- Headquarters: Kaliningrad, Kaliningrad Oblast, Russia
- Circulation: 3000

Königsberger Express is a German-language monthly newspaper published in Kaliningrad, Russia. An online version was published until 2024. The newspaper reports on political and economic news in Kaliningrad Oblast.

== History ==
Königsberger Express was first published in May 1993; it is unrelated to an earlier newspaper of the same name, published in East Prussia prior to World War II. It was founded by Igor Zarembo (1948–2021). It was originally intended as a newspaper for formerly displaced people in and from Kaliningrad and their descendent, before changing its focus to reporting on economic, social and political affairs in Kaliningrad Oblast. Two-thirds of information published in Königsberger Express comes from regional Russian-language newspapers and Russian news agencies, with the remaining third stemming from editorial contributions.

Following the Russian invasion of Ukraine in 2022, Königsberger Express suffered from a worsening financial situation due to a decline in German-speaking tourists and business people travelling to Kaliningrad. It has also been reported that the newspaper was being subjected to political pressure, including monitoring from the Federal Security Service, after publishing articles critical of Russian government policy. In early 2023, the Königsberger Express closed its office in Kaliningrad, and its website went offline in April 2024, though the newspaper continues to be published on a monthly basis.

Königsberger Express' current editor-in-chief is Elena Lebedeva. It is an independent newspaper financed through advertising and sales revenue and subscriptions. The newspaper has been described as different to other newspapers in Kaliningrad Oblast due to it remaining "less rigidly conformist" even following the outbreak of the Russo-Ukrainian war, though it does tend to publish pieces in line with Russian government policy.

== Publication and circulation ==
The print edition of Königsberger Express is published by the German publisher Rautenberg Media KG, based in Troisdorf, North Rhine-Westphalia, Germany. Its current circulation is around 3000 copies, and its readership is primarily German tourists and residents of Kaliningrad, and German speakers interested in the region; in addition to Russian German learners. Around 2000 of Königsberger Express subscribers reside in Germany, while the remaining 1000 live in Russia.

At its peak in the mid-2000s, the circulation of Königsberger Express stood at between 5000 and 7000 copies, depending on the tourist season. In 2008, it switched to being published monthly.

== Recognition ==
In 2000, Königsberger Express was awarded the Gerd Bucerius Prize for Free Press in Eastern Europe from German newspaper Die Zeit, alongside the Belarusian newspaper Brestskiy Kurier, the Lithuanian magazine Veidas, and Russian journalist Veronika Koutsyllo.
