= Vladyslav Yesypenko =

Ukrainian journalist

- Born: 13 March 1969

Vladyslav Yesypenko (born March 13, 1969) is a Ukrainian journalist who was arrested on March 10, 2021 by the Federal Security Service of the Russian Federation (FSB). At the time, he was working as a freelance journalist for Krym.Realii, reporting on conditions in Crimea. On February 16, 2022 Yesypenko was sentenced to six years in prison. International human rights organizations raised concerns about his arrest, treatment, the charges made against him, and his sentencing as involving "clear violation of international human rights standards and press freedom". As of 24 June 2025, Yesypenko was released, having spent over four years in detention.

== Early life and education ==
Vladyslav Yesypenko and his wife Kateryna Yesypenko lived in Sevastopol, Crimea prior to the Russian annexation of Crimea. They then moved to Kryvyi Rih in Ukraine. Yesypenko holds dual Russian-Ukrainian citizenship.

== Career ==
In 2016, Yesypenko began doing freelance work as a contributor to Krym.Realii (Crimea.Realities), a Ukrainian Service outlet of Radio Free Europe/Radio Liberty (RFE/RL) focusing on the Crimea. He wrote about the Crimean Tatar community, focusing on social and ecological impacts such as lack of electricity, deteriorating training facilities for football teams, and the destruction of a Crimean nature reserve.

== Arrest and trial ==
On March 10, 2021, Yesypenko was detained by the Federal Security Service, while driving through the Angarskyi Pass in Crimea. On the previous day he had filmed a flower-laying event commemorating Ukrainian poet Taras Shevchenko. Yesypenkof was taken to a basement, possibly in the area of Bakhchisaray, where he was tortured and interrogated. He was later taken to SIZO Pre-Trial Detention Center No. 1 in Simferopol.

On March 12, 2021, Yesypenko was charged with “illegal production, repair, or modification of firearms”. On March 18, 2025, the Russian TV channel Crimea24 broadcast a staged interview in which Yesypenko "confessed" to spying for the Ukrainian Security Service. On July 15, 2021, Yesypenko was charged with “possession and transport of explosives”.

Yesypenko was not allowed independent legal representation. Lawyers retained by his family to represent him were denied access to him. The family's lawyers were told that Yesypenko had refused their assistance. Yesypenko was tried in a closed trial which domestic and international observers were not allowed to attend. In court, Yesypenko refused to be represented by his state-appointed lawyer, who stepped down from the case on April 6, 2022.

During his trial, Yesypenko stated that he was tortured during his imprisonment and forced to make a false confession, which he now rejected. Yesypenko denied the charges, and stated that an explosive device claimed to have been in his car had been planted during his detention. It was shown in court that the device in question was too large to fit in the glove compartment where officers claimed to have found it. Nonetheless, on February 16, 2022, Simferopol City Court sentenced Yesypenko to six years in prison and a fine of 110,000 Russian rubles for possession and transport of explosives.

== Responses ==
The Council of Europe assigned Yesypenko's case a rating as a Level 1 alert, on its Platform for the Protection of Journalism. This rating indicated "the most severe and damaging violations of media freedom, having a severe impact on media freedom".

The Human Rights House Foundation (HRHF) presented a statement on Yesypenko's case during the 47th session of the United Nations Human Rights Council in July 2021. A statement was also made to the Council by the delegation of Ukraine.

Yesypenko appealed to the Russian-established High Court of Crimea. On August 18, 2022, the High Court uphold his conviction but reduced his sentence to five years in prison, shortening it by one year. In April 2023, the Supreme Court of Russia refused Yesypenko's further appeal to hear the case.

In November 2022, Ukraine’s Crimean Prosecutor launched criminal proceedings against an FSB officer over Yesypenko’s unlawful detention and torture. As of September 8, 2023, the European Union sanctioned two judges, a prosecutor and two FSB officers who were involved in the arrest, torture and prosecution of Vladyslav Yesypenko.

== Release ==
On June 24, 2025, Yesypenko was released, after spending over four years of his original six-year sentence in prison. He rejoined his wife Kateryna and daughter Stefania in Prague.

In 2025, Yesypenko and Dmytro Khyliuk testified before the Parliamentary Assembly of the Council of Europe (PACE) about violations of international law against Ukrainian prisoners. Yesypenko’s broken glasses were included in an accompanying exhibition, “Press In Detention”. The exhibition listed twenty-six Ukrainian journalists as currently incarcerated by Russia.

== Awards and honors ==
- 2021, Levko Lukianenko State Scholarship
- 2022, Ihor Lubchenko National Prize for the Protection of Freedom of Speech, National Union of Journalists of Ukraine.
- 2022, Free Media Award, Stiftelsen Fritt Ord and ZEIT-Stiftung
- 2022, PEN/Barbey Freedom to Write Award, PEN America
