= Beb =

Beb or BEB may refer to:

== Nickname ==
- Herbert Asquith (poet) (1881–1947), English poet, novelist, and lawyer
- Beb Bakhuys (1941–1980), French jazz double-bassist
- Beb Guérin (1909–1982), Dutch football player and manager
- Beryl Hearnden (1897–1978), English progressive farmer, journalist and author
- Beb Vuyk (1905–1991), Dutch writer

== Acronym ==
- Battery electric bus
- Beach Erosion Board
- Best of European Business
- Binary exponential backoff, a congestion avoidance technique

== Other uses ==
- Béb, a Hungarian village
- beb, ISO 639-3 code of the Bebele language of Cameroon
- BEB, IATA code for Benbecula Airport, Benbecula, Scotland
