= Hafiz Babali =

Azerbaijani journalist

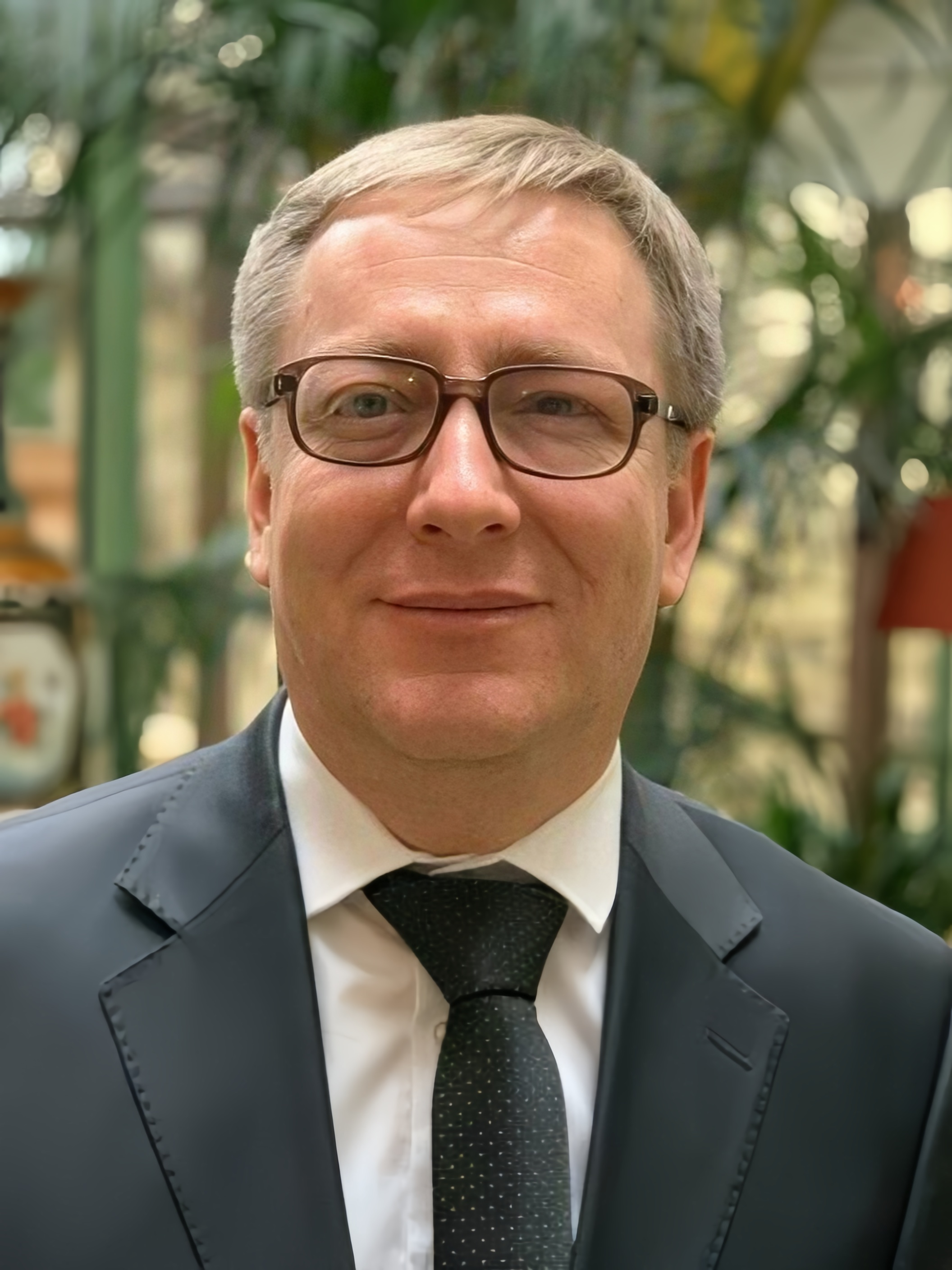
- Hafiz Babali in 2019
- Born: September 9, 1971 (age 54); Mücü, Ismayilli District, Azerbaijan SSR
- Citizenship: Azerbaijan
- Education: Baku State University
- Occupations: journalist, political prisoner
- Years active: 1992–
- Awards: Free Media Awards (2019)

Hafiz Babali (full name: Hafiz Arkoyun oglu Babali, Azerbaijani: Hafiz Ərköyün oğlu Babalı; born September 9, 1971, Mücü, Ismayilli District, Azerbaijan SSR) is an Azerbaijani journalist and political prisoner. He was the editor of the economic department of the Turan Information Agency and has served as the deputy chair of the Institute for Reporters’ Freedom and Safety (IRFS) since 2016. He is the recipient of the Gerd Bucerius Free Media of Eastern Europe Award for 2019.

On 13 December 2023, Babali was charged in a criminal case against the management and journalists of Abzas Media, initiated by the Investigation Department of the Main Police Directorate of Baku, and was arrested by a decision of the Khatai District Court on 14 December 2023. On 16 August 2024, the charges in the criminal case investigated by the Main Police Directorate of Baku were expanded. Babali and other individuals arrested in the case were charged under eight articles of the Criminal Code of Azerbaijan, including Articles 192.3.2, 193–1.3.1, 193–1.3.2, 206.4, 320.1, and 320.2. These charges include illegal entrepreneurship resulting in large-scale income; money laundering committed by an organized group; smuggling committed by an organized group; document forgery and the use of forged documents.

On 20 June 2025, the Baku Court on Grave Crimes sentenced Babali to nine years of imprisonment.

From December 2023 to July 2025, he was held in the Baku Pre-Trial Detention Center (Zabrat settlement). From July 2025 to September 2025, he was held in the Umbaku Penitentiary Complex (Çeyildağ settlement). Since September 2025, he has been serving his sentence in Correctional Facility No. 2 (Khazar District).

== Early life ==
Hafiz Babali was born on 9 September 1971 in the village of Mücü, Ismayilli District. He completed secondary school in Sumgait in 1989.

In the late 1980s and early 1990s, he worked as a postman and as a general laborer in Sumgayit. In 1996, he graduated from the Faculty of Journalism of Baku State University.

== Journalistic career ==
Babali began his journalistic career as a translator at the newspaper Metallurq between 1992 and 1994. From 1994 to 1997, he worked as a correspondent for the newspaper Günay.

Since 1 August 1997, he has been working as a journalist at the Turan Information Agency, where he serves as editor of the economic department.

Since 2016, he has also served as the deputy chair of the Institute for Reporters’ Freedom and Safety (IRFS).

His investigations into political corruption and corporate misconduct were published by Radio Free Europe/Radio Liberty from 2015 to 2017, by Meydan TV from 2017 onward, and by Abzas Media since 2022.

In May 2019, he was awarded the Gerd Bucerius Free Media Award for analytical and critical articles on corruption and human rights violations in Azerbaijan.

Due to his journalistic activities, Babali has repeatedly reported receiving threats.

== Participation in elections ==
Hafiz Babali was a candidate from the Republican Alternative Movement (REAL) in the parliamentary elections held on 1 November 2015. He ran in Sumgayit Electoral District No. 42.

During the election campaign, Babali stated in interviews that the principle of equality among candidates was violated. He argued that all candidates who received signature sheets for collecting voter signatures should have equal opportunities. According to him, district election commissions openly favored candidates from the ruling New Azerbaijan Party, and while signature sheets should legally be issued within five days, candidates from the ruling party received them within one day.

Although six candidates participated in the election, the main competition took place between Tahir Mirkishili, a candidate of the New Azerbaijan Party and adviser to the minister of economy and industry, and Hafiz Babali. According to official results, Babali placed second, receiving 1,608 votes (7.6%).

Babali stated that the elections were falsified and that the results did not reflect reality. He reported the existence of dozens of video recordings, photographs, and official reports documenting violations during the voting process, which he said were sufficient grounds for invalidating the election results. He also stated that voters from other constituencies had been identified voting in the district. Babali argued that the Constitutional Court should not rush to announce the final election results and should wait until all appeals regarding violations were considered.

Parliamentary election results
Year	Electoral district	Party/Bloc	Voices	%	Place
2015	Second electoral district of Sumgait No. 42	REAL Movement	1608	7.6%	2/6

== Arrest and trial (2023–2025) ==
On 28 November 2023, Hafiz Babali was questioned as a witness in criminal case No. 230200080 conducted by the Investigation Department of the Main Police Directorate of the city of Baku, Department for the Investigation of Grave Crimes. After the questioning, Babali stated that he had been summoned as a witness in a criminal case initiated against the management of Abzas Media. He noted that he had used Abzas Media as a platform to publish his journalistic investigations but was not questioned about those investigations. According to Babali, the questions focused on the activities of Abzas Media, the structure of his cooperation with the outlet, and primarily on financial matters, as well as on his journalistic activities and sources of income.

Two weeks later, on 13 December 2023, Babali was detained by police at the Baku railway station, where he had arrived from Sumgait, where he resides. A search was conducted at his home, during which his computer, mobile phone, and various documents were seized. According to his son, seven to eight police officers participated in the search, which lasted approximately two hours.

On 14 December 2023, Babali was charged at the Main Police Directorate of Baku under Article 206.3.2 of the Criminal Code of Azerbaijan (smuggling committed by an organized group) in connection with the criminal case against journalists of Abzas Media. The same day, Judge Sulhana Hajiyeva of the Khatai District Court ordered Babali's detention for three months, until 13 March 2024. Babali refused to plead guilty and stated that the criminal prosecution was linked to his professional activities, particularly his investigative journalism. His lawyer, Rasul Jafarov, stated that the investigative authorities had failed to present substantial evidence linking Babali to the alleged crime and that Babali had previously appeared voluntarily for questioning when summoned as a witness. On 20 December 2023, the Baku Court of Appeal, presided over by Judge Hasan Ahmadov, considered the defense's appeal and upheld the detention order.

On 10 January 2024, the Khatai District Court considered a motion to replace Babali's detention with house arrest, which was rejected. The appeal against this decision was also rejected on 19 January 2024.

On 7 March 2024, the Khatai District Court extended Babali's pre-trial detention for another three months. The defense objected, arguing that the prosecution had failed to justify the necessity of continued detention and that, under the European Convention on Human Rights and case law of the European Court of Human Rights, pre-trial detention requires primary evidence of guilt, which was absent in Babali's case.

Further motions to place Babali under house arrest were rejected on 2 April and 22 August 2024. His detention was repeatedly extended in June, July, and September 2024.

On 16 August 2024, the prosecution expanded the charges, adding multiple articles of the Criminal Code, including illegal entrepreneurship, money laundering by an organized group, smuggling, document forgery, and use of forged documents.

The trial of Abzas Media journalists, including Hafiz Babali and Radio Free Europe/Radio Liberty journalist Farid Mehralizade, began on 17 December 2024. During the trial, Babali denied all charges and stated that his arrest was related to his journalistic work. Motions by the defense to replace detention with house arrest were repeatedly rejected.

On 20 May 2025, prosecutor Rauf Malishov requested a sentence of 11 years’ imprisonment. On 20 June 2025, the Baku Court on Grave Crimes sentenced Hafiz Babali to nine years’ imprisonment. In August 2025, the Baku Court of Appeal began considering the appeal. By a decision of Judge Zafar Ahmadov on 9 September 2025, the sentence was upheld.

== International attention ==
On 14 December 2023, Reporters Without Borders (RSF) condemned the detention of Hafiz Babali. The Committee to Protect Journalists (CPJ) and the Human Rights House Foundation (HRHF) also called on the Azerbaijani authorities to release him.

The European Union expressed concern over the arrests of journalists and opposition figures in Azerbaijan, stating that restrictions on independent journalism and freedom of expression contradict Azerbaijan's international obligations. Babali was specifically named among detained journalists.

The British Ambassador to Azerbaijan, Fergus Auld, expressed concern over Babali's arrest, stating that press freedom is a fundamental pillar of democracy and that Council of Europe member states must ensure journalists can work without restrictions or threats.

== Awards ==
- Free Media Awards (2019) — Gerd Bucerius Award for Free Media of Eastern Europe

== Personal life ==
Hafiz Babali is married and has three children.

== See also ==
- Media freedom in Azerbaijan
