= Vitebskiy =

Vitebskiy may refer to:

- Iosif Vitebskiy (1938–2024), Soviet Ukrainian Olympic medalist and world champion fencer and fencing coach
- Vitebskiy Kurier, Belarusian newspaper
