= Veronika Koutsyllo =

Russian journalist (born 1967)

- Вероника Куцылло
- Born: 24 July 1967 (age 59); Bratsk, Russian SSR, Soviet Union
- Citizenship: Russia
- Education: Moscow State University
- Occupation: Journalist
- Years active: 1990–present
- Awards: Gerd Bucerius Prize for Free Press in Eastern Europe (2000)

Veronika Iosifovna Koutsyllo (Russian: Вероника Иосифовна Куцылло; born 24 July 1967) is a Russian journalist. She is the deputy editor-in-chief of the historical magazine Diletant, and previously served as deputy editor-in-chief of the socio-political magazine Kommersant-Vlast and editor-in-chief of Open Russia's website, as well as MBKh Media. On 4 October 2022, the Russian Ministry of Justice added Koutsyllo to its list of "foreign agents".

== Biography ==
Koutsyllo was born in Bratsk, Irkutsk Oblast in what was then the Russian Soviet Federative Socialist Republic of the Soviet Union, and grew up in the Kazakh Soviet Socialist Republic. In 1994, she graduated from Moscow State University's Faculty of Journalism.

In 1990, Koutsyllo began working as a correspondent for the then-weekly newspaper Kommersant and the news agency Postfactum. She went on to specialise in political journalism and parliamentary reporting. In 1993, Koutsyllo published a book, Zapiski iz Velogo doma (lit. 'Notes from the White House'), about the 1993 Russian constitutional crisis.

In 1995, Koutsyllo lodged a case with the Constitutional Court of Russia for it to rule on whether resident registration rules in Moscow complied with the Russian constitution. The court ultimately ruled that the Government of Moscow's decision to charge people to register as residents was illegal.

In January 1997, Koutsyllo became the political editor of Kommersant, a publishing house; in November, she became the head of its political department. In May 2000, Koutsyllo was named as deputy editor-in-chief of Kommersant-Vlast, a weekly socio-political magazine. She left in 2011. Since 2012, Koutsyllo has been the deputy editor-in-chief of Diletant magazine. Between 2012 until its closure in 2013, she was also the deputy editor-in-chief of OpenSpace.ru's online portal.

Between 2014 and 2017, Koutsyllo was the editor-in-chief of Open Russia's website. From 2017 until its closure in 2021, Koutsyllo was the editor-in-chief of MBKh Media, a socio-political website.

In 2022, Koutsyllo was named editor of the online news website Polygon.Media, created b MBKh Media journalists.

On 4 October 2022, the Ministry of Justice added Koutsyllo to its list of foreign agents, alongside other journalists including Tikhon Dzyadko and Kira Yarmysh.

== Recognition ==
In 2000, Koutsyllo was the first individual journalist to receive the Gerd Buceris Prize for Free Press in Eastern Europe, alongside the Belarusian newspaper Brestskiy Kurier, the Russian newspaper Königsberger Express, and the Lithuanian magazine Veidas. Koutsyllo was recognised for her "high journalistic professionalism", including through her leadership of the political department of Kommersant, and her "courageous defence" of democracy in Russia.
