= Bucerius Kunst Forum =

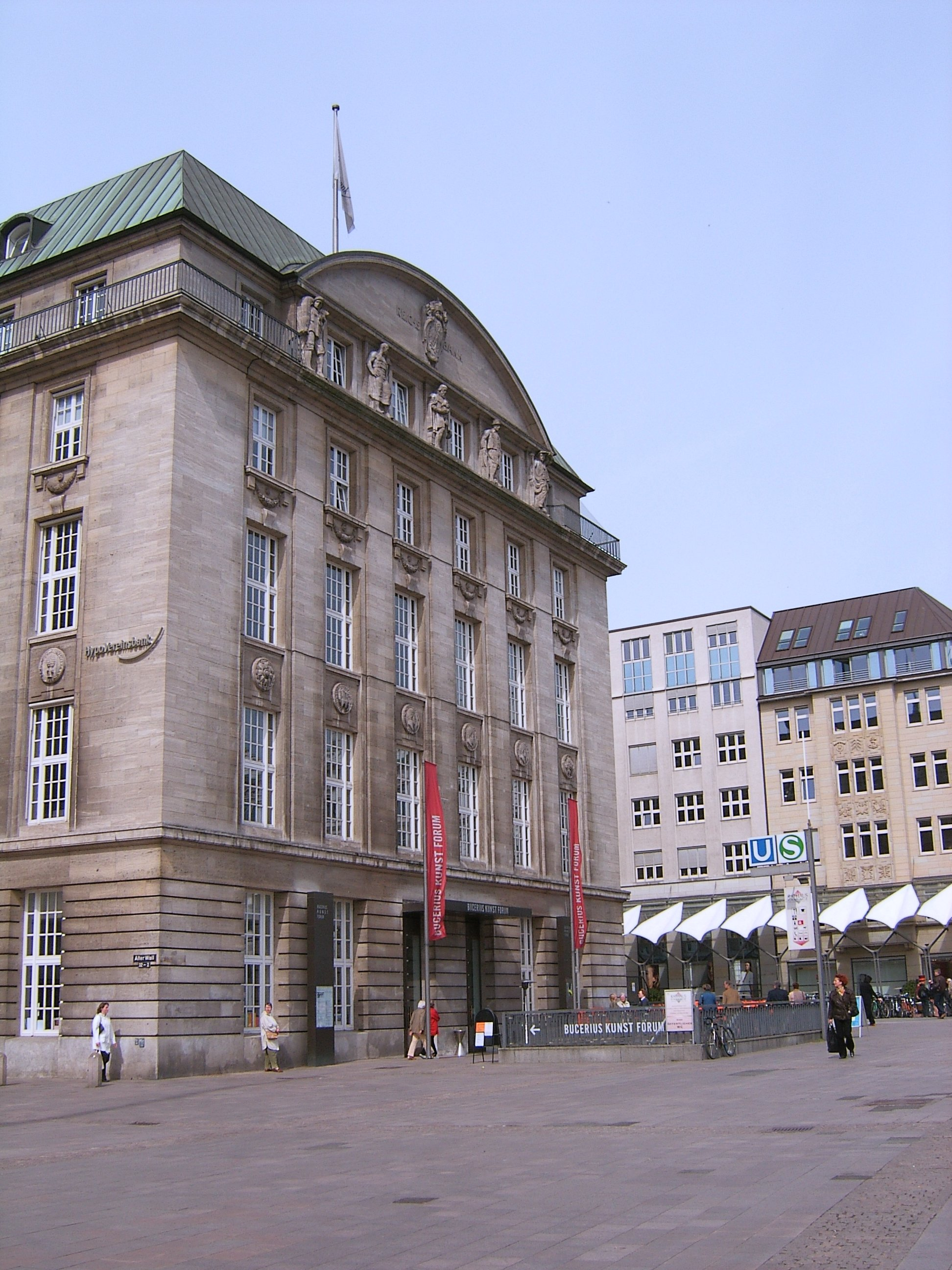

- Location of Bucerius Kunst Forum in Hamburg Bucerius Kunst Forum (Germany)
- Established: 2002
- Location: Hamburg, Germany
- Coordinates: 53.551111°N 9.991944°E
- Type: Art museum
- Public transit access: Rathaus station
- Website: http://www.buceriuskunstforum.de/en/

The Bucerius Kunst Forum is an international art exhibition centre in Hamburg, Germany, founded by the ZEIT-Stiftung Ebelin und Gerd Bucerius foundation in 2002 and located directly beside the Hamburg Rathaus. Named after German newspaper Die Zeit founder Gerd Bucerius and his wife, the exhibition centre curates 4 yearly exhibitions centred around themes spanning from the Classical era to contemporary art, often in cooperation with other museums and collections. The exhibition centre participates in the Long Night of Museums.

== Concept ==
The Bucerius Kunst Forum's mission is to showcase art of high quality in new contexts. The exhibitions focus on one topic, epoch or artist. They are intended to show artistic coherences, relationships between epochs and disciplines and to build bridges between ancient and modern art. The art pieces are to be viewed under a new aspect: an exhibition to the oeuvre of Henri Matisse gathered his portraits for the first time; the exhibition about Frida Kahlo devoted itself first to the connection between Mexican and European art. Thus also connoisseurs are to achieve new impressions.

The manageable size of the display area induces a precise focus of the topic and a limitation on 100 exhibits. At visitor-surveys three special experiences are named consistently: the visitors are delighted to be able to see the whole exhibition within one hour, without being exhausted; they have the satisfying feeling that their attention lasts for everything; and they were able to connect the experience of art with an increase in knowledge.

Despite the focus on a broad public demographic interested in the arts, the exhibitions of the Bucerius Kunst Forum are scientifically sound. Frequently they are preceded by a symposium, which assembles international specialists of one topic. During the symposium topics and theses of the exhibition are discussed. Until the summer of 2008 these symposiums took place at the Warburg Haus, Hamburg; since the winter of 2008 they have been hosted at the Bucerius Kunst Forum. The contributions are printed in widely illustrated exhibition catalogues, which have been published by Hirmer Verlag since 2005.

For most of the exhibitions the exhibits are assembled from various museums around the world. Thus "Terror and Desire. The Temptation of St. Anthony from Hieronymus Bosch to Max Ernst" showed exhibits from more than 40 lenders from 10 different states, while "High Society. American Portraits of the Gilded Age" gathered exhibits from 32 lenders, among which were exhibits from 29 different museums of the United States. Occasionally exhibitions show thematic presentations, which are chosen from the collection of one institution, such as the Mannerism exhibition from the Szépmüvészeti Múzeum in Budapest or the exhibition "New World. Creating an American Art" with pieces from the Wadsworth Atheneum in Hartford (Connecticut).

So far the lenders have included, among others:

- Museo del Prado, Madrid
- Louvre, Paris
- National Gallery of Art, Washington
- Staatliche Museen zu Berlin
- The Tate Gallery, London
- Staatliche Kunstsammlungen Dresden
- Museum of Modern Art, New York
- Museum Ludwig, Cologne
- Centre Pompidou, Paris
- Kunstsammlung Nordrhein Westfalen, Düsseldorf
- The Israel Museum, Jerusalem
- National Gallery of Ireland, Dublin
- Musée d'Orsay, Paris
- Victoria and Albert Museum, London
- Pinakothek der Moderne, Munich
- Solomon R. Guggenheim Museum, New York
- Naples National Archaeological Museum
- Gemeentemuseum Den Haag
- The National Gallery, London
- Rijksmuseum, Amsterdam
- The British Museum, London
- Kunsthistorisches Museum Wien
- Städel Museum, Frankfurt am Main

It belongs to the concepts of the house to design the display area for every new exhibition in fundamentally new colours and architecture to convey a new spatial experience every time.

== Topics ==
The thematic range of the exhibitions is broadly defined and reaches from ancient times to the present age. From the field of archaeology there were exhibitions about the Etruscans, Cleopatra and "Painting for Eternity. The Tombs of Paestum". Extra-European cultures were discussed during "Art of the Silk Road. The Allure of Buddha", old masters through an exhibition about Lucas Cranach the Elder as well as "Greco, Velázquez, Goya. Spanish Paintings from German Collections", eras and periods of time through "Descent into the World. The Art of Mannerism in Europe" and "Between Heaven and Hell. Medieval Art".

Themed exhibitions discussed "Cloud Pictures" or "The Temptation of St. Anthony". The biggest thematic project so far was a trilogy about 150 years of American art from 1800 to 1950. From 2007 to 2009 it presented the three respective leading categories of paintings of the United States in three consecutive parts: 19th-century landscapes, portraits around 1900 and finally the urbanism of the years 1900 to 1950.

The focus is on artists of classical modernism. Up to this point Willi Baumeister, Max Beckmann, Marc Chagall, Otto Dix, Frida Kahlo, Oskar Kokoschka, Henri Matisse, Pablo Picasso, Auguste Rodin and the artist community Die Brücke have been paid tribute through monographic exhibitions.

The exhibition "Gerhard Richter. Images of an Era" in 2011 presented for the first time a contemporary artist at the Bucerius Kunst Forum.

In the summer of 2012 the Bucerius Kunst Forum dedicated itself to the medium of photography in the exhibition "New York Photography 1890-1900".

== Curators ==
The concepts of all exhibitions are developed in-house by the scientific department of the house or in collaboration with visiting curators

Former curators and visiting curators were:

- Marion Ackermann, Düsseldorf
- Bernard Andreae, Rom
- Alla Chilova, Cologne
- Ina Conzen, Stuttgart
- Barbara Dayer Gallati, Bristol
- Klaus Gallwitz, Karlsruhe
- Nikolai Grinew, Nowgorod
- Doris Gröpper, Berlin
- Barbara Haskell, New York
- Bärbel Hedinger, Berlin
- Andreas Hoffmann, Hamburg
- Tatiana Kasarmschtschikowa, Nowgorod
- Kordelia Knoll, Dresden
- Michael Kuhlemann, Mülheim
- Steingrim Laursen, Copenhagen
- Elizabeth Mankin Kornhauser, Hartford
- Magdalena M. Moeller, Berlin
- Karsten Müller, Hamburg
- Marga Paz, Madrid
- Michael Peppiatt, London
- Meira Perry-Lehmann, Jerusalem
- Ewgenia Petrowa, St. Petersburg
- Hélène Pinet, Paris
- Michael Philipp, Hamburg
- Ulrich Pohlmann, Munich
- Inés Richter-Musso, Cagliari
- Valeria Sampaolo, Naples
- Werner Schade, Berlin
- Uwe M. Schneede, Hamburg
- Irina Solowjowa, St. Petersburg
- Heinz Spielmann, Hamburg
- Vilmos Tátrai, Budapest
- Christoph Vögele, Solothurn
- Matthias Weniger, Munich
- Ortrud Westheider, Hamburg
- Marianne Yaldız, Berlin

== Bucerius Kunst Club ==
The "Bucerius Kunst Club", founded at the end of 2002, is the non-profit friends’ association of the Bucerius Kunst Forum. The wide programme of events during the exhibitions with technical lectures, readings, movies and concerts, excursions and art journeys are made possible by the Bucerius Kunst Club's subscriptions, donations and voluntary activities.

The club finances both the children's programme and the scientific traineeship of the house. This traineeship gives junior scientists a year-long education in the exhibition business.

The approximately 1,900 members of the club benefit depending on the category of their membership: they receive the exhibition catalogues for free, get free entry into the exhibition at any time and are invited to the openings and previews. They obtain reductions for the events and are allowed to participate in a wide offer of exclusive activities such as art journeys, day trips, seminars, and tours through the other culture institutions of Hamburg.

== Building and location ==
The Bucerius Kunst Forum is located at the Rathausmarkt, on the corner of the Alter Wall with the adjacent Rathaus and the building of the Hamburger Börse (Handelskammer) in the city centre, i.e., the historic city. On one side it adjoins the Alsterfleet with the Rathausschleuse.

The representative landmarks building was built for the Reichsbank-Hauptstelle Hamburg starting in 1914 (construction 1914–1916, completion 1918/1919, alteration and restoration 1981-1983), which is also pointed out by the inscription of the tympanum of the façade on both sides of the imperial coat of arms. The neoclassical building is decorated with sculptures which symbolize the commercial life of the Hamburg area (fishermen, blacksmiths, merchants, sailors) and medallions of the three emperors of the realm. Economic power and armed forces are symbolized by figures of Mercury and a knight above the entry of Alter Wall with a revetted marble staircase and foyer (the material originates from the former German colony of Togo).

The entrance - leading into the museum - at the Rathausmarkt was created especially for the Bucerius Kunst Forum. Formerly, the ticket hall was located in the lower exhibition area. The eight pillars decorated with mosaics and arranged in an octagon belong to the original structure. They are also to be found in the display area on the first floor. Overall the display area amounts to about 850 square meters.

During the renovation and rearrangement of the rooms by architect's office Jan Störmer the safety devices and air conditioners were installed, which guarantee ideal exhibition terms and are to match the highest demands of the leading museums in the world.

The Ian-Karan-Auditorium, the Lounge with a view onto the Rathausmarkt and Alster, and the restaurant Season are also rented out for private events.

== Cooperation partners ==
As a young exhibition house with international alignment the Bucerius Kunst Forum depends on co-operation with museums domestic and abroad. It may be that curators from other houses conceptualize exhibitions as guest curators or that exceptional pieces from international museum collections are on display. As a double exhibition "The Etruscans. Pictures of Life on Earth – Pictures of Death" (2004) was displayed simultaneously at the Bucerius Kunst Forum and at the Museum für Kunst und Gewerbe, Hamburg.

Some exhibitions at Bucerius Kunst Forum were conceptualized in co-operation with other houses. Among those were:

- "Greco, Velázquez, Goya" (2005): conceptualized with Old Masters Picture Gallery, Dresden, and displayed there after its duration in Hamburg. Afterwards it was shown at the Szépmüvészeti Múzeum, Budapest.
- "Rodin in Germany" (2006): conceptualized with the sculpture collection of the State Art Collection at Dresden and displayed there after its duration in Hamburg.
- "Matisse. People Masks Models" (2009): conceptualized with the Staatsgalerie Stuttgart and displayed there first.
- "Ferdinand Hodler and Cuno Amiet" (2012): conceptualized with the Solothurn Art Museum and displayed there after its duration in Hamburg.
- "Dionysus. Intoxication and Ecstasy" (2013): conceptualized with the State Art Collection at Dresden and displayed there after its duration in Hamburg.
- "Miró. Painting as Poetry" (2015): conceptualized with the Kunstsammlung Nordrhein-Westfalen and displayed there after its duration in Hamburg.

Another form of co-operation is the takeover of an exhibition conceptualized by the Bucerius Kunst Forum by another museum. Former second stations were:

- "Cloud Pictures" (2004): Alte Nationalgalerie Berlin and Aargauer Kunsthaus, Aargau
- "Willi Baumeister. Figures and Drawings" (2005): Westphalian State Museum of Art and Cultural History, Münster, and Von der Heydt Museum, Wuppertal
- "Painting for Eternity. The Tombs of Paestum" (2008): Martin-Gropius-Bau, Berlin
- "Modern Life. Edward Hoppe and his Time" (2009): Kunsthal Rotterdam, Whitney Museum of American Art, New York
- "Rubens, van Dyck, Jordaens. Baroque Art from Antwerp" (2010): National Museum of Art, Architecture and Design, Oslo
- "Turner and the Elements" (2011): National Museum in Kraków and Turner Contemporary in Margate
- "Matta. Fictions" (2012): Museum Frieder Burda, Baden-Baden
- "Mondrian. Colour" (2014): Turner Contemporary in Margate

== Cooperating institutions ==
- Belgium
  - Royal Museums for Fine Arts of Belgium, Antwerpen
- Denmark
  - National Gallery of Denmark
- Germany
  - Museum Frieder Burda (Baden-Baden)
  - Museum of Asian Art, Berlin
  - National Museums in Berlin
  - Brücke-Museum Berlin
  - National Gallery, Berlin
  - Dresden State Art Collections
  - Old Masters Picture Gallery, Dresden
  - Skulpturensammlung Dresden
  - Augustinermuseum, Freiburg
  - Photography Collection, Stadtmuseum Munich
  - Hamburger Kunsthalle
  - Museum für Kunst und Gewerbe, Hamburg
  - Jenisch House, Hamburg
  - State Museum for Art and Cultural History Muenster
  - Staatsgalerie Stuttgart
  - Von der Heydt-Museum, Wuppertal
  - Kunstkammer Rau, Arp Museum Bahnhof Rolandseck, Remagen
  - Lindenau-Museum, Altenburg
- France
  - Réunion des musées nationaux et du Grand Palais des Champs-Élysées, Paris
  - Musée Picasso, Paris
  - Musée Rodin, Paris
- Great Britain
  - Tate Gallery, London
  - Turner Contemporary, Margate
- Ireland
  - National Gallery of Ireland, Dublin
- Israel
  - Israel Museum, Jerusalem
- Italy
  - National Archeological Museum Paestum
  - National Archeological Museum, Naples
  - Museo di Villa Giulia, Rome
- Mexico
  - Museo Dolores Olmedo, Mexico City
- Netherlands
  - Kunsthal Rotterdam
  - Gemeentemuseum Den Haag, the Hague
- Poland
  - National Museum Krakow
- Russia
  - United State Museums, Veliky Novgorod
  - Russian Museum, St. Petersburg
  - A. Rodtschenko - W. Stephanowa Archive, Moskau
- Switzerland
  - Aargauer Kunsthaus
  - Kunstmuseum Solothurn
  - Fondation à la mémoire d'Oskar Kokoschka, Musée Jenisch, Vevey
- Hungary
  - Szépművészeti Múzeum, Budapest
- United States
  - Walters Art Museum, Baltimore
  - Wadsworth Atheneum Museum of Art, Hartford
  - Whitney Museum of American Art, New York
  - George Eastman House, Rochester, New York

== Sponsorship, legal form and funding ==
The Bucerius Kunst Forum is an institution of ZEIT-Stiftung Ebelin und Gerd Bucerius in the legal form of a non-profit limited company. The foundation is the sole shareholder and is financing the Bucerius Kunst Forum with the income of its endowment capital to about two-thirds. The remainder is earned in ticket and catalogue sales as well as postcard sales and renting out parts of the exhibition house for exclusive events. The Bucerius Kunst Forum does not utilize public funds.

Exhibitions with many international loans as the America-Trilogy were supplied by foreign foundations as the Terra Foundation for American Art, the Henry Luce Foundation, and the Max Kade Foundation. Companies like ExxonMobil, Latham & Watkins or Bankhaus Lampe as well as Lampe Asset Management engage themselves in individual projects as sponsors. There was an institutional partnership with HSH Nordbank for the duration of three years from 2007 to 2009.

== Leadership ==
Founding director of the Bucerius Kunst Forum was the former director of the Schleswig-Holsteinische Landesmuseum Schloss Gottorf, Heinz Spielmann, who was leading the House until 2005. Ortrud Westheider was the director until 15 February 2016. From June 2016 to May 2019 Franz Wilhelm Kaiser was the director and since June 2019 Kathrin Baumstark is the director of the Bucerius Kunst Forum. The CEO of the Bucerius Kunst Forum is Andreas Hoffmann.

== Former exhibitions ==
After the first unofficial exhibition Masterpieces from Dresden from 25 October until 19 November 2002 following exhibitions were shown:

- Picasso and the Myths, from 13 December 2002 until 16 March 2003
- Lucas Cranach. Faith, Mythology and Modern Age, from 6 April until 13 July 2003
- Art of the Silk Road. The Allure of Buddha, from 17 August until 12 October 2003
- Max Beckmann. People by the Sea, from 9 November 2003 until 1 February 2004
- The Etruscans. Pictures of Life on Earth – Pictures of Death, from 13 February until 16 May 2004
- Cloud Pictures. The Discovery of the Heavens, from 6 June until 5 September 2004
- The "Brücke" and Modern Art, from 17 October 2004 until 23 January 2005
- Nowgorod. The golden age of Icons, from 13 February until 16 May 2005
- Greco, Velázquez, Goya. Spanish Paintings from German Collections, from 28 May until 21 August 2005
- Willi Baumeister. Figures and Drawings, from 31 August until 30 October 2005
- Oskar Kokoschka. Passion of seeing, from 26 November 2005 until 5 February 2006
- Rodin in Germany 100 years ago, from 18 February until 25 May 2006
- Frida Kahlo, from 15 June until 17 September 2006
- Cleopatra and the Caesars, from 28 October 2006 until 4 February 2007
- New World. Creating an American Art, from 24 February until 28 May 2007
- Ghost Trains and Glamour Shows. Otto Dix. Watercolors and Gouaches, from 16 June until 9 September 2007
- Painting for Eternity. The Tombs of Paestum, from 30 October 2007 until 20 January 2008
- Terror and Desire. The Temptation of St. Anthony from Hieronymus Bosch to Max Ernst, from 9 February until 18 May 2008
- High Society. American Portraits of the Gilded Age, from 7 June until 31 August 2008
- Descent into the World. The Art of Manerism in Europe, from 15 November 2008 until 11 January 2009
- Matisse. People Masks Modells, from 31 January until 19 April 2009
- Modern Life. Edward Hopper and his Time, from 9 May until 30 August 2009
- Between Heaven and Hell. Medieval Art, from 19 September 2009 until 10 January 2010
- Genuine Illusions. Illusions and Reality in Art, from 13 February until 24 May 2010
- Rubens, van Dyck, Jordaens. Baroque Art from Antwerp, from 11 June until 19 September 2010
- Marc Chagall. Life lines, from 8 October 2010 until 16 January 2011
- Gerhard Richter. Images of an Era, from 5 February until 15 May 2011
- Turner and the Elements, from 2 June until 11 September 2011
- Invention of the Picture. Early Italian Masters through Botticelli, from 1 October 2011 until 8 January 2012
- Ferdinand Hodler and Cuno Amiet, from 28 January until 1 May 2012
- New York Photography 1890-1950. From Stieglitz to Man Ray, from 17 May until the 2 September
- Matta. Fictions, from 22 September 2012 until 6 January 2013
- Alberto Giacometti. Encounters, from 26 January until 20 May
- Rodchenko. A New Era, from 8 June until 15 September 2013
- Dionysus. Intoxication and Ecstasy, from 3 October 2013 until 12 January 2014
- Mondrian. Colour, from 1 February until 11 May 2014
- Kirchner. The Expressionist Experiment, from 20 May until 7 September 2014
- Pompeii. Gods, Myths, Man, from 20 September 2014 until 11 January 2015
- Miró. Painting as Poetry, from 31 January until 25 May 2015
- When Water Matters. Painting and Photography from J.M.W. Turner to Olafur Eliasson, from 13 June 2015 until 20 September 2015
- From Poussin to Monet. The Colors of France, from 10 October 2015 until 17 January 2016
- Picasso. Window to the World, from 6 February until 16 May 2016
- The World Upside Down. Hieronymus Bosch’s Century, from 4 June until 11 September 2016
- Venice. City of Artists, from 1 October 2016 until 15 January 2017
- Paula Modersohn-Becker. Pioneer of Modern Art, from 4 February until 1 May 2017

== See also ==
- List of museums and cultural institutions in Hamburg
- Bucerius Law School
