= Seymur Hazi =

Azerbaijani politician and journalist

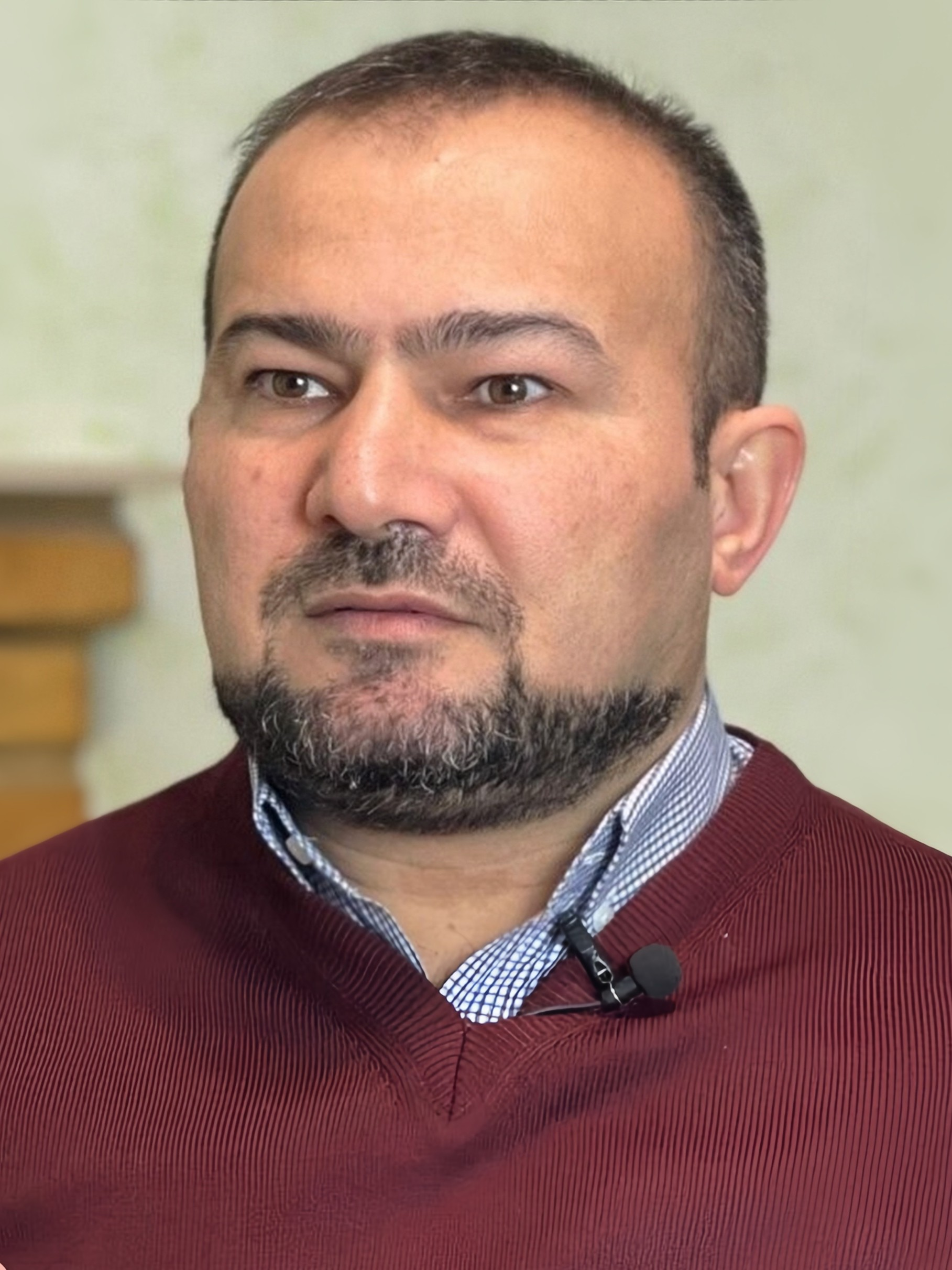
- Seymur Hazi in 2024

Deputy Chairman of the Azerbaijan Popular Front Party
- Incumbent
- Assumed office 2 February 2015

Chairman of the youth organization of the Azerbaijan Popular Front Party
- In office 11 January 2002 – December 2008
- Succeeded by: Abulfaz Gurbanli

Personal details
- Born: March 1, 1982 (age 44) Dünyamalılar, Beylagan District, Azerbaijan Soviet Socialist Republic
- Citizenship: Azerbaijan
- Education: Baku State University
- Occupation: politician, journalist, political prisoner
- Awards: Free Media Awards (2016)

Seymur Hazi (full name: Seymur Mashgul oglu Hazi, Azerbaijani: Seymur Məşgül oğlu Həzi; born March 1, 1982, Dünyamalılar, Beylagan District, Azerbaijan SSR) — Azerbaijani journalist, political analyst, and politician, as well as a former political prisoner. He has served as Deputy Chairman of the Azerbaijan Popular Front Party since 2015 and has been a member of the party’s Presidium since 2010. From 2002 to 2008, he was the chairman of the youth organization of the Azerbaijan Popular Front Party. In 2016, he was awarded the Gerd Bucerius “Free Press of Eastern Europe” Prize.

Throughout his journalistic and socio-political activities, Hazi has repeatedly faced persecution, detentions, and arrests. In the early 2000s, he was sentenced several times to short-term imprisonment. In April 2011, he was abducted and beaten by unknown individuals, an incident that caused widespread public reaction both in Azerbaijan and internationally.

In August 2014, criminal charges were brought against him, and in January 2015 the Absheron District Court sentenced him to five years of imprisonment. International human rights organizations recognized him as a prisoner of conscience. He was released in August 2019 after completing his sentence. In October 2024, the European Court of Human Rights ruled that the criminal prosecution against Hazi in Azerbaijan had been unlawful.

== Early life and education ==
Seymur Mashgul oglu Haziyev was born on March 1, 1982, in the village of Dünyamalılar, Beylagan District. From 1999 to 2003, he studied at the Faculty of Oriental Studies of Baku State University. From 2003 to 2005, he completed a master's degree at Baku State University. From 2005 to 2008, he was a postgraduate student at the Institute of Law and Philosophy of the Azerbaijan National Academy of Sciences. In 2008–2009, he completed his compulsory military service in the Ministry of Defense.

== Political activity ==
Hazi became involved in socio-political processes at a young age. In March 2000, he joined the Azerbaijan Popular Front Party. On January 11, 2002, he was elected chairman of the party’s youth organization and remained in this position until December 2008.

In December 2005, he participated in the establishment of a committee to defend the rights of students expelled from universities for political reasons and became its chairman. He also joined a student hunger strike.

On May 15, 2010, he was detained during a protest organized by the “Azadlıq” bloc in front of the Narimanov cinema, demanding democratic conditions during the pre-election period. By decision of the Narimanov District Court, he was sentenced to seven days of administrative detention.

On September 25, 2010, he was elected a member of the Presidium at the Fifth Congress of the Azerbaijan Popular Front Party.

In June 2013, he became a member of the National Council of Democratic Forces, established ahead of the presidential election.

On February 2, 2015, while imprisoned, he was appointed Deputy Chairman of the Azerbaijan Popular Front Party.

In May 2016, he received the Gerd Bucerius “Free Press of Eastern Europe” Prize for his analytical and critical articles on corruption and human rights violations in Azerbaijan.

On October 17, 2019, he was detained by police ahead of protests in Baku. By decision of the Khatai District Court, he was sentenced to 30 days of administrative detention.

== Abduction and beating (2011) ==
On March 26, 2011, at approximately 00:30 local time, Seymur Hazi was abducted and assaulted by unknown individuals. In the settlement of Ceyranbatan (Absheron District), six men wearing black masks forced him into a Mercedes minibus and transported him to an unknown location, where he was severely beaten. According to Hazi, during the beating he was warned about his writings and told not to write about President Ilham Aliyev.

Hazi stated that the assault was directly linked to his journalistic activities. Azerbaijani politicians, journalists, and international organizations condemned the incident, and it was mentioned in reports by the OSCE and the U.S. Department of State.

== Political arrest and trial (2014–2015) ==
On August 29, 2014, Hazi was detained by police and charged under Article 221.3 (hooliganism) of the Criminal Code. He denied the charges, stating that he acted in self-defense and that the case was politically motivated. In January 2015, the Absheron District Court sentenced him to five years in prison.

The verdict was upheld by appellate courts. Numerous international organizations, including Amnesty International, recognized Hazi as a prisoner of conscience and called for his release.

On October 24, 2024, the European Court of Human Rights delivered its judgment in the case “Haziyev v. Azerbaijan”, ruling that the criminal prosecution and imprisonment of Seymur Hazi violated Articles 6 and 10 of the European Convention on Human Rights. The Court ordered the Azerbaijani authorities to pay compensation.

== Personal life ==
Hazi married Musavat Party activist Nigar Yagublu on August 2, 2016, while he was imprisoned. Their daughter, Humay, was born on May 22, 2025.

== See also ==
- Human rights in Azerbaijan
- Media freedom in Azerbaijan
