= Rauf Mirgadirov =

Azerbaijani journalist

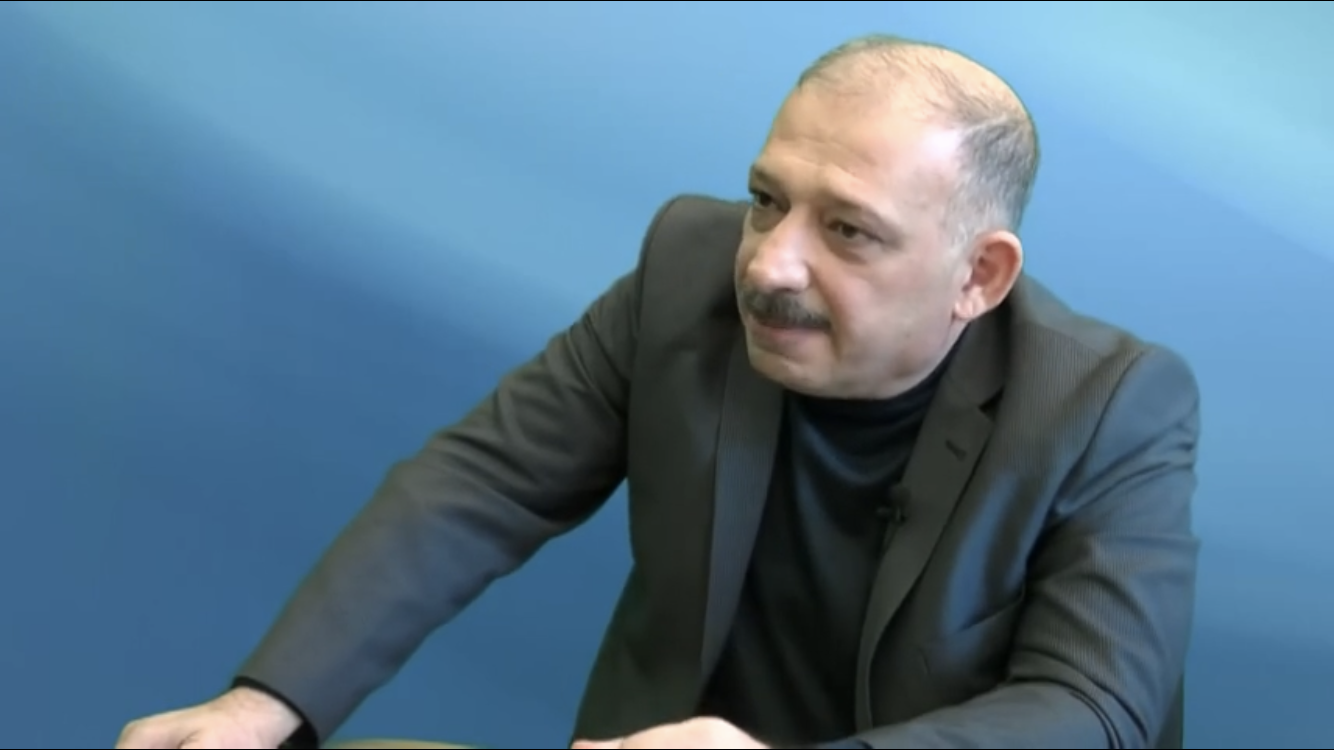
Mirgadirov.

Rauf Habibulla oghlu Mirgadirov (Azerbaijani: Rauf Mirqədirov; born 1961) is an Azerbaijani columnist and journalist. He has worked for the Baku based Russian-language newspaper Zerkalo. A believer in "citizen diplomacy" between Armenia and Azerbaijan over the Nagorno-Karabakh conflict, Mirgadirov was arrested for allegedly spying for Armenia and was detained since April 2014. In December 2015, he was found guilty and sentenced to six years of prison. Following an appeal of his case, the ruling was upheld in March 2016, but Mirgadirov was released on suspended sentence.

== Life and career ==
Rauf Mirgadirov was born in Baku, Azerbaijan in 1961. Mirgadirov studied journalism at Azerbaijan State University and graduated from there. After graduation he worked in the publishing house "Azerneshr." Rauf Mirgadirov was part of the newspaper "Azadlig" (Freedom) in its initial years. In December 1989, he was in Jalilabad District during clashes between internal forces and the local population. Since 1991, he engaged in journalism and worked in the newspaper "Ayna-Zerkalo" ("Ayna" being the Azerbaijani version of the newspaper).

During the state of emergency Rauf Mirgadirov and a group of other journalists produced newspaper "Bizim Yol" (Our way). Thereafter, since the mid-1990s, Mirgadirov worked at the "Shargh" news agency. He was then deputy editor of the magazine "Monitor" and edited the opposition newspaper "Azerbaijan Democrática". He also became the chief editor of "Millet" newspaper.

Since the beginning of the 2000s, Rauf Mirgadirov worked in the newspaper "Zerkalo". Since 2010 he lived in Turkey with his family working as correspondent.

Rauf Mirgadirov has participated in various international conferences on the issues and settlement of the Nagorno-Karabakh conflict. A believer in "citizen diplomacy" between the two countries, Mirgadirov visited Armenia several times. While in Armenia, Mirgadirov, a member of Institute for Peace and Democracy (IPD), held meetings with Armenian NGOs.

In 2005, Mirgadirov was awarded the title "Honored Journalist of Azerbaijan" by Azerbaijani President Ilham Aliyev.

In 2008, Rauf Mirgadirov was awarded the "Free Press of Eastern Europe" international prize of Gerd Bucerius in 2008 for achievements in the development of independent media.

== Arrest, trial and sentence ==
Since 2010 Rauf Mirgadirov lived in Turkey with his family working as correspondent for Zerkalo and Ayna. However, in April 2014, he was deported from Turkey to Azerbaijan where he was arrested upon arrival at the airport. Mirgadirov was arrested on charges of spying for Armenia. The deportation of Mirgadirov to Azerbaijan was made immediately after Turkish Prime Minister Recep Tayyip Erdoğan's visit to Baku. This sequence of events made Mirgadirov's lawyer assume that the deportation was due to an arrangement between Azerbaijan and Turkey. Since the arrest, Mirgadirov remained in pretrial custody. His initial detention period was three months but this has been extended several times.

The charges stem from Mirgadirov's visits to Armenia between 2008 and 2009, where he allegedly transferred information to Armenian intelligence about Azerbaijan's political and military status which include "photos and schemes to be used against Azerbaijan." Mirgadirov's lawyer claims the allegations are groundless and that it is impossible for Mirgadirov that have such information in his possession. Leyla Yunus, another human rights activist arrested on similar charges, considered Mirgadirov's arrest as a start to a "full, unofficial ban on contacts with Armenia." Yunus also questioned the timing of the arrest and states: "If the Ministry of National Security, as alleged, had suspected Mirgadirov of espionage back in 2008–2009, why did it keep quiet until now?"

A spokeswoman for the Human Rights Watch stated that "The context and timing of Mirgadirov's arrest suggest that the case against him is politically motivated and intended to punish him for his outspoken views and to send a chilling message to others that dissent will not be tolerated."

Throughout the trial, Mirgadirov maintained his innocence. On 28 December 2015, he was found guilty of spying and sentenced to six years of prison. The ruling was upheld by the Court of Appeal on 17 March 2016, but Mirgadirov was released on suspended sentence. He vowed to seek the overruling of the sentence in order to clear his name and be reunited with his family. Mirgadirov also complained about failing health. At the same time, he denied being mistreated while in custody or being forced to testify against other political prisoners, noting that it would be "unfair" of him to accuse the authorities of putting pressure on him. He stressed his intention to continue his journalism activity in the future.

== International condemnation ==
Rauf Mirgadirov's arrest was condemned by the Human Rights Watch, European Union officials, World Organisation Against Torture, International Federation for Human Rights, Committee to Protect Journalists, Reporters Without Borders, United States Mission to the OSCE, and others.

Amnesty International states that Mirgadirov has been "arrested on what appear to be trumped-up charges of spying for Armenia." Reporters Without Borders spokesman Johann Bihr said "The grave charges brought against Mirqadirov are totally absurd and fool no one. He is just the latest victim of the Azerbaijani government's campaign to eradicate its media critics. How could this journalist have transmitted state secrets to which he did not have access?" In its statement the Committee to Protect Journalists spokeswoman Nina Ognianova stated: "We call on Azerbaijani authorities to drop these trumped-up charges and stop abusing the law to silence independent reporting on the country, Azerbaijan is quickly becoming one of the leading jailers of journalists in the Eurasia region."

United States State Department spokesman Jen Psaki stated that the United States is "disturbed by allegations that his arrest may have been connected with his critical reporting about the Azerbaijani government or his participation in people-to-people programs aimed at easing tensions and building confidence in the region."

== Personal life ==
Rauf Mirgadirov has a wife and three daughters. His wife, two daughters and Rauf have fled Azerbaijan and have been granted political asylum in Switzerland.
