= Martin C. Wittig =

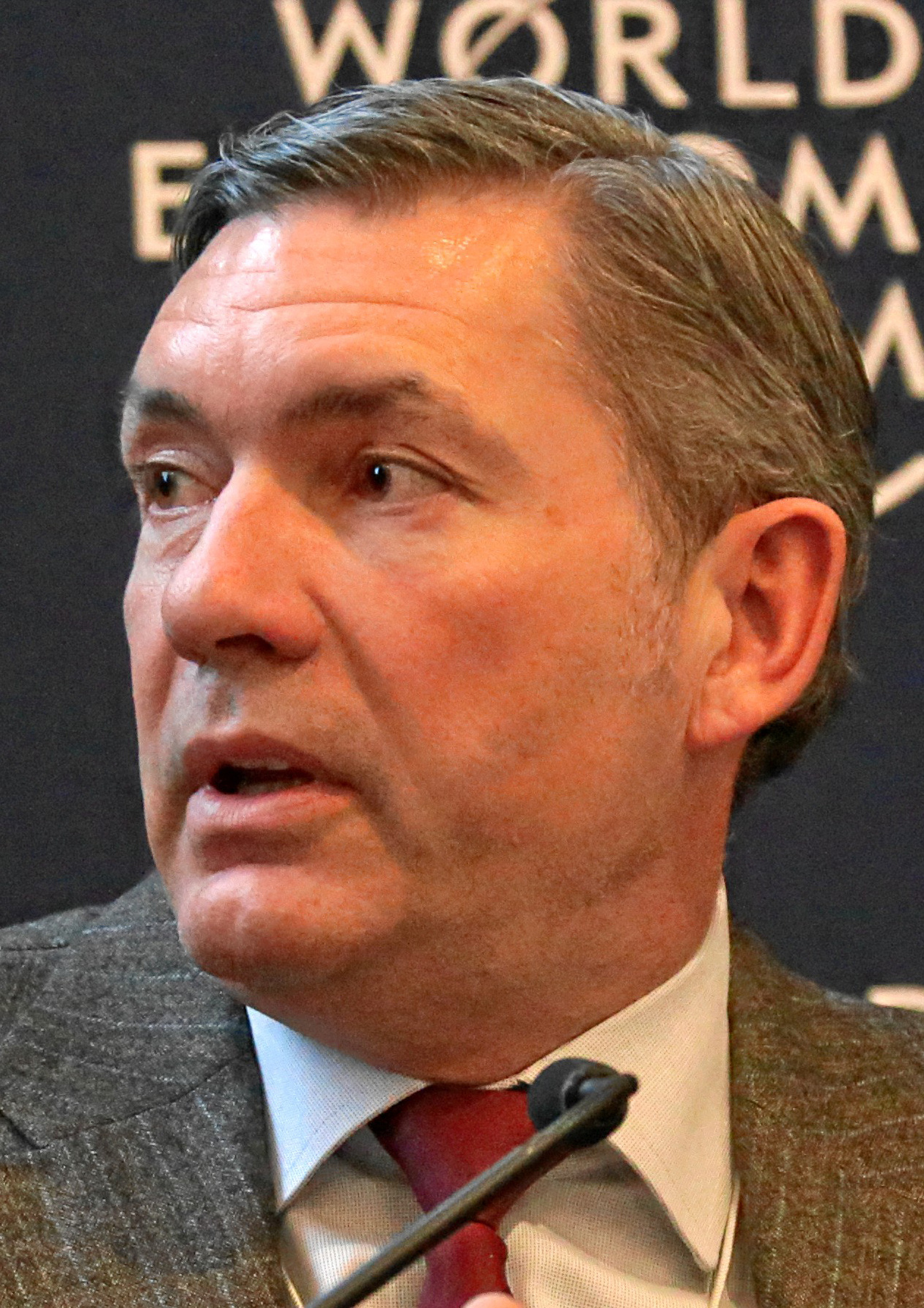
Martin Wittig, 2013.

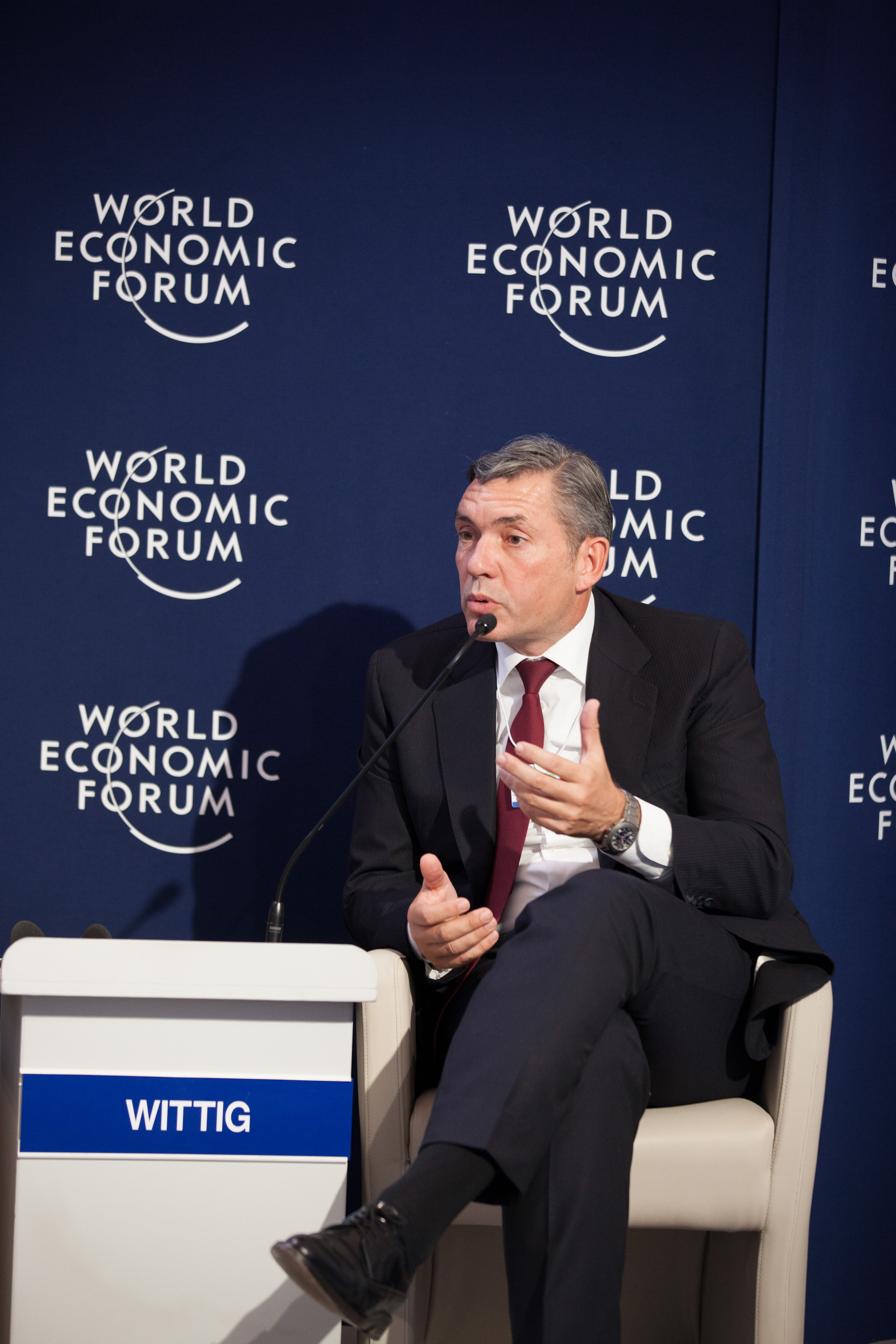
Martin Wittig at the Rebuilding Europe’s Competitiveness Meeting, Villa Madama, Rome 30 October 2012

Martin Christoph Wittig (born 20 January 1964) was the German CEO of the management consultant firm Roland Berger Strategy Consultants. He is the successor/antecessor of CEO Burkhard Schwenker. Martin Christof Wittig is married and lives with his wife and his two sons near Zurich (Switzerland).

== Life ==
Martin C. Wittig studied Mining and Business Administration at RWTH Aachen University (Germany) and worked as a miner for two years. With a thesis about investment planning, he achieved his PhD summa cum laude at Technische Universität Berlin. At this time, he held lectures at the TU Berlin.

In 1995, he joined Roland Berger Strategy Consultants and became an associate partner in 1999 and a full partner in 2000. Since January 2001, he has been acting as managing partner and director of the branch in Zurich.

In December 2002, Wittig was elected chief financial officer (CFO) by the partners in the global executive committee of Roland Berger. In 2006, the partners confirmed his mandate. Wittig was elected the CEO of Roland Berger Strategy Consultants unanimously by 180 partners in 2010.

During his work as a consultant his areas of expertise were focused on corporate finance and turnaround management with the industrial focuses of aviation/transportation as well as financial services.

Wittig stepped back in May 2013 for health reasons.

Martin C. Wittig has held a lectureship at the University of St. Gallen since 2007.

The Federal Foreign Office of Germany appointed Wittig to the Honorary Consul of Germany for the nation of Switzerland in 2018, more accurate for the Canton of Schwyz and the Canton of Zurich.

On occasion, Wittig had praised retail investor René Benko and pressed his then business partner Klaus-Michael Kühne to meet with Benko in 2019, resulting in a Kühne investment of half a billion Euros in Benkos Signa Holding. The money was lost when the Sigma holding became insolvent in 2023 and Benko got eventually arrested. In 2025 press research revealed, that Wittig got paid by Benko for reaching the Kühne investment with some 1,6 million Swiss francs. Following the reveal, Martin Wittig admitted the connection with Benko to Kühne and stepped down from his position in the Kühne Logistics board of directors.
