= Aziz Karimov =

Azerbaijani photographer (born 1987)

- Born: 29 May 1987 (age 38); Baku, Azerbaijan SSR, USSR
- Citizenship: Azerbaijani
- Occupation: News Photojournalist
- Awards: Free Media 2020

Aziz Karimov (Azerbaijani: Əziz Elxan oğlu Kərimov) is an Azerbaijani photographer. He was awarded Free Media Awards 2020 by the Fritt Ord (organization).

== Life and work ==
He was born in 1987 Baku and graduated from Azerbaijan State University of Culture and Arts alumni. In 2013 Karimov worked for Associated Press, subsequently starting his career as a freelance photographer.

In 2019, he was a frequent contributor to Getty Images. In 2013, Freedom House auctioned off photographs from more than 20 countries, including Azerbaijan, Bahrain, Belarus, China, Russia, South Sudan, and Syria. The images, taken by amateur and professional photographers, were chosen as finalists from among hundreds of submissions to Freedom House's second annual photo contest, Karimov covered the War in Donbas, and Nagorno-Karabakh conflict.

In 2014, he attended "INTERNATIONAL SUMMER PHOTOGRAPHY SCHOOL" with Magnum Photos. In 2017, he was a Lecturer at Azerbaijan State Academy of Physical Education and Sport, sports photojournalism. In 2019, he was a Lecturer at Azerbaijan University of Languages – Photojournalism.

In 2020, Karimov's photo was included in the 2020 annual report, Associated Press photographers captured a world in distress.

On May 5-23, 2025, he participated in training on | "Photojournalism: Stories with Images" in the United States

== Awards ==
2013 Press Photographer of the Year award, Photographers Association of Azerbaijan

2015 Azeri journalists among the winners of EU-funded Media project

2020 Azerbaijani photographers win gold medals

2020 Aziz Karimov awarded the Free Media Awards 2020

2023 Press Photographer of the Year award, Photographers Association of Azerbaijan
