= Burkhard Schwenker =

German business consultant (born 1958)

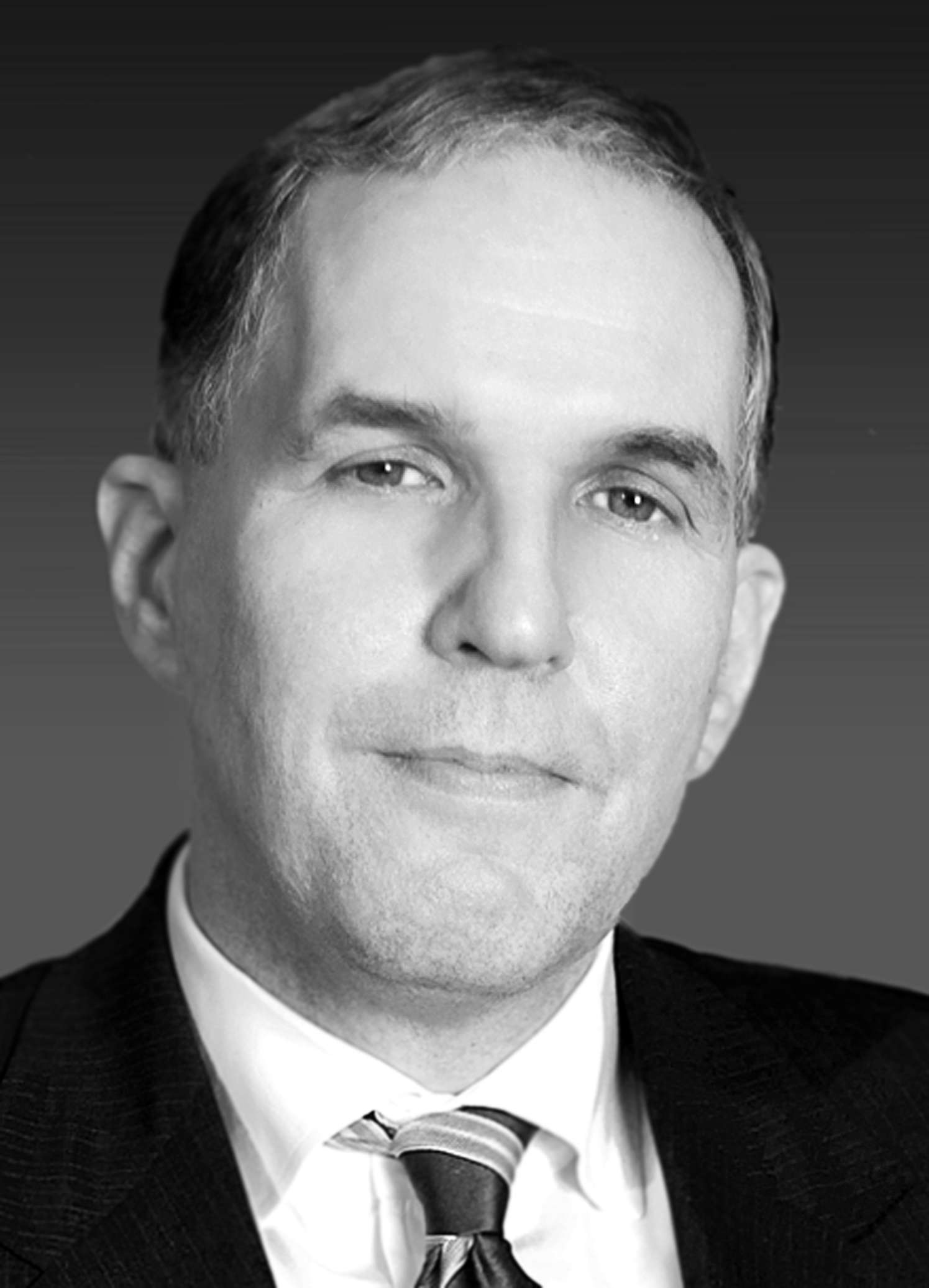
- Born: 20 April 1958 (age 68); Minden, West Germany
- Education: Bielefeld University; Nordische Universität (PhD, 1989)
- Occupations: Chairman of Roland Berger's advisory council; Vice-chairman of the Atlantik-Brücke; Member of the advisory board of the ZEIT-Stiftung

Burkhard Schwenker (born 20 April 1958) is a German business consultant. He was CEO of Roland Berger (then called Roland Berger Strategy Consultants) from 2003 until July 2010, when he was appointed head of the supervisory board of the firm. He was CEO again from May 2013 to July 2014, after his successor/antecessor Martin C. Wittig stepped back for health reasons. He again was chairman of the supervisory board until he was appointed chairman of Roland Berger's advisory council in July 2015.

Schwenker is vice-chairman of the Atlantik-Brücke and sits on the advisory board of the ZEIT-Stiftung.

== Education and career ==
Burkhard Schwenker studied mathematics and economics at Bielefeld University. He started his professional career as the assistant to the board of management at Papierwerke Waldhof-Aschaffenburg AG (PWA). After completing his PhD in economics, he became a member of the company then called Roland Berger Strategy Consultants in 1989, and was elected partner in 1992.

In 1994, he took over the management of the Center of Excellence in Corporate Development. In 1998, he led negotiations concerning the management buyout of Roland Berger Strategy Consultants, between Deutsche Bank and the partners of the company. In 2003, Schwenker was appointed the head of the Executive Committee of Roland Berger, this appointment being renewed for another term by the partners in 2006. In July 2010, he was appointed Chairman of the Supervisory Board. After his successor, Martin C. Wittig, stepped back for health reasons on 4 May 2013, Schwenker resumed his responsibilities as CEO, until Charles-Edouard Bouée was appointed CEO by the Partners. Schwenker then returned to his post as head of the supervisory board until 2015.

In 2008 he was appointed as honorary professor by the Leipzig Graduate School of Management (HHL). At the HHL Schwenker teaches strategic management with a focus on organization, strategy, and corporate transformation. Together with Torsten Wulf, Burkhard Schwenker has been the Academic Director of the school's Center for Scenario Planning since 2009.

In addition, he was a member of the Board of the German Academic Association for Business Research (Verband der deutschen Hochschullehrer für Betriebswirtschaft, VHB) until 2014 and is currently deputy chairman of the VHB-Board of Friends. He is a member of the University Council at the Technical University Bergakademie Freiberg. In addition, he is a Trustee of Dresden International University and the EBS Universität für Wirtschaft und Recht (University for Business and Law). Burkhard Schwenker is also Visiting Fellow at the Saïd Business School, University of Oxford.

In July 2017 Schwenker was appointed head of the newly created Kühne Logistics University advisory board.

When he changed to the Supervisory Board of Roland Berger Strategy Consultants in 2010, Burkhard Schwenker created a moderate uproar by writing a farewell letter to the staff at the company in which he critically reflected upon his time as the company's CEO.

Additionally, Schwenker is the initiator of Best of European Business.

Burkhard Schwenker is married and has three children. He lives in Hamburg.

== Board memberships ==
Schwenker is a member of the supervisory boards of the Hamburger Sparkasse, of Hamburg Airport and is on the M. M. Warburg & Co. private bank shareholder board. In May 2017 he was appointed chairman of the Hensoldt GmbH advisory board by the Federal Ministry of Economy.

Schwenker sits on the advisory board of a variety of start-ups, including FreightHub, an all-digital trucking company headquartered in Berlin, Germany.

== Socio-political engagement ==
Besides his tasks as chairman of the Advisory Board of Roland Berger, Burkhard Schwenker is engaged in various initiatives and organizations. On 1 September 2010, Burkhard Schwenker became head of the Roland Berger Foundation. Each year, the foundation awards scholarships to underprivileged youth. Additionally, Schwenker supports the "Verband deutscher Unternehmerinnen (VdU)", the German branch of the international FCEM, and its key project focusing on the promotion of a stronger presence of women on supervisory boards. Since 2015 he sits on the advisory board of the charity ZEIT-Stiftung.

He is Deputy Chairman of Atlantik Brücke e.V. As Deputy Chairman of Atlantik-Brücke he's working to strengthen German-American relations. Within Atlantik-Brücke he is also in charge of the working group on foreign and security policy.

Schwenker is chairman of the Board of the Hamburg Symphony Orchestra.

In November 2011 Burkhard Schwenker was a member of a 21-man jury which, in cooperation with the German magazine Wirtschaftswoche, selected the 60 most important people driving the country's so-called Energiewende ("energy transition").

Schwenker is patron of the book project "Jüdische Soldaten - jüdischer Widerstand" (Jewish soldiers – Jewish resistance). In his opinion the book offers historic experiences, which could be the foundation of education in a European community of shared values.

He is a member of the Senate or Board of Trustees for the following: Germany's National Academy of Science and Engineering (acatech); the Wittenberg Center for Global Ethics e.V.; the Wertekommission – Initiative wertebewusste Führung (Values Commission for the Initiative on Values-Based Management); the Stiftung Initiative Wertestipendium (Foundation for the Values Stipend Foundation); the World Wide Fund for Nature (WWF) and the "Lebendige Stadt" ("Vibrant City") Foundation. He was also one of the trustees of berufundfamilie GmbH, an initiative of the non-profit Hertie-foundation, as well as of Wertekommission e.V.

He is a member of "Wissensfabrik – Unternehmen für Deutschland" and chairman of its jury awarding the founders prize Weconomy.

Schwenker is very active in the area of refugee relief. As chairman of the Roland Berger Foundation he contributed substantially to the research study "Die Flüchtlingskrise als Chance" (The refugee crisis and its opportunities). Furthermore, he decided to sponsor a refugee from Afghanistan.

== European engagement ==
Apart from his publications in professional fields, such as strategy, organization, and change management, Schwenker promotes a Europe-wide, value-oriented, and sustainable approach to management. As head of the supervisory board at Roland Berger Strategy Consultants, a noted European consultancy, Schwenker has promoted a self-confident image of Europe as the initiator and jury member of "Best of European Business". This award acknowledges successful European businesses.

In addition, Burkhard Schwenker acts as counsel for the Roland Berger Foundation for European business management. He also writes about and discusses European topics as a guest-author of various Business Magazines.

== Selected publications ==
Burkhard Schwenker has authored a number of publications, including various books about economics- and management-related topics. In November 2012, he published a book on leadership, called Gute Führung / On good management. "The corporate lifecycle" is an essay by Burkhard Schwenker featuring interviews with Franz Fehrenbach, Jürgen Hambrecht, Wolfgang Reitzle and Alexander Rittweger. In February 2011, he published Europa führt! Plädoyer für ein erfolgreiches Managementmodell (Europe shows the way! The case for a superior management model). This book, published as a part of the rethink:CEO-series, deals with the "Erfolgsmodell Europa" (Success-story Europe). In Schwenker's eyes, this European management approach based on consistency, local strengths, global cooperations and social as well as sustainable orientation is the successful counterpart to the American leadership-style.

Bibliography

- Schwenker, B. / B. Dauner-Lieb (2017), Gute Strategie: Der Ungewissheit offensiv begegnen; Campus Verlag; ISBN 978-3-593-50767-5
- Schwenker, B. / T. Wulf (2013), Scenario-based Strategic Panning: Developing Strategies in an Uncertain World; Berlin and Heidelberg: Springer; ISBN 978-3-658-02874-9
- Schwenker, B. / T. Clark (2013), Europe's Hiden Potential: How the 'Old Continent' Could Turn into a New Superpower; A&C Black Business Information and Development ISBN 978-1-40819-22-83
- Schwenker, B. / M. Müller-Dofel (2012), Gute Führung – Über den Lebenszyklus von Unternehmen; Cologne: BrunoMedia; ISBN 3943442004
- Schwenker, B. (2011), Re:Think CEO 4. Europe takes the lead! Speaking up for a successful management approach (abstract; in German), original title: Europa führt! Plädoyer für ein erfolgreiches Managementmodell; Cologne: BrunoMedia; ISBN 978-3-9814012-6-4
- Schwenker, B. (2009), Management between strategy and finance: the four seasons of business; Berlin / Heidelberg: Springer; ISBN 978-3-540-85274-2
- Schwenker, B. (2008), Re:Think CEO 1. Thinking strategy – leading with courage (abstract; in German), original title: Re:Think CEO 1. Strategisch denken – Mutiger führen; Cologne: BrunoMedia; ISBN 978-3-9811506-6-7
- Schwenker, B. / Spremann, K. (2007), Management between strategy and finance: the four seasons of business (abstract; in German), original title: Unternehmerisches Denken zwischen Strategie und Finanzen: Die vier Jahreszeiten der Unternehmung; Berlin: Springer; ISBN 978-3-540-75950-8.
- Schwenker, B. / Bötzel, S. (2006), On the road to growth: gaining success through expansion and increased efficiency (abstract; in German), original title: Auf Wachstumskurs: Erfolg durch Expansion und Effizienzsteigerung; Berlin / Heidelberg / New York: Springer; ISBN 978-3-540-26755-3
- Schwenker, B. (1989), Competitive service providers: market dynamics and strategic development guidelines (abstract; in German), original title: Dienstleistungsunternehmen im Wettbewerb: Marktdynamik und strategische Entwicklungslinien; Wiesbaden: Deutscher Universitäts-Verlag;
- Burkhard Schwenker, Mario Müller-Dofel: Gute Führung – Über den Lebenszyklus von Unternehmen. BrunoMedia, Köln 2012, ISBN 3943442004.
