= Arsenyevskiye Vesti =

Independent newspaper

- Type: Weekly newspaper
- Format: socio-political newspaper
- Owner(s): Iryna Grebnyova; Nadezhda Alisimchik; Marina Zavadskaya
- Editor-in-chief: Iryna Grebnyova
- Founded: 1992; 34 years ago
- Language: Russian
- Headquarters: Vladivostok
- Country: Russian Federation
- Circulation: 15 000
- Website: ars-news.ru

Arsenyevskiye Vesti (Russian: Арсеньевские вести) is an independent socio-political and human rights weekly newspaper of the Primorsky Krai.

It was originally registered in Arsenyev in 1992, but after the refusal of the Arsenyev printing house to print materials, it was forced to move to Vladivostok the same year. The main theme of the newspaper is the coverage of topical events in the region, violations of the rights of citizens and exposure of high-ranking officials. Editor Irina Grebnyova (born in 1943).

In October 2009, the European Court of Human Rights granted the application of a newspaper journalist who was found guilty by the state courts of the Russian Federation of publishing an open letter exposing officials in illegal timber deals.

In 2010 the newspaper received Free Media Awards.
