= Best of European Business =

Best of European Business (BEB) is an annual competition by Roland Berger Strategy Consultants and has been established in 2005.

== Idea ==
The idea of Best of European Business is to award European op-companies and –managers for outstanding economical performances. European entrepreneurs as role models are awarded in the categories growth, creation of value, innovation and strategy. Every year the BEB focusses on a certain topic. In 2011 German companies have been awarded with focus on the markets of ASEAN-countries. This ceremony does not only award the European companies and managers, but also call attention on the strengths of the European economy.

== Initiator and jury ==
Initiator of BEB is Burkhard Schwenker, Chairman of Roland Berger Strategy Consultants. The Best of European Business-Award is taking place in numerous European countries by managers of successful companies. Among the judges are Jürgen Großmann (RWE), Jean-Cryil Spinetta (Air France) or Daniel Vasella (Novartis). Numerous national and international partners of media and science are supporting Best of European Business.

== Winners ==
2012, category "successful and sustainable business strategies in Africa":

- BASF
- Commerzbank
- Linde
- Siemens

2011:

- DHL (Success in Asia - best large corporation)
- TÜV SÜD AG (Success in Asia - best mid-sized company)
- Dieter Zetsche (Growth Strategy in Asia - best manager)
- Jochen Zaumseil (Success in Asia - best manager)

Further winners (abstract):

- Porsche (2005/2006)
- BASF (2005/2006)
- Puma (2006/2007)
- Airbus (2007/2008)
- Hochtief (2009/2010)

== See also ==
- List of business awards
