= Heinz Spielmann =

German art historian and curator (born 1930)

Heinz Spielmann (born 9 November 1930, in Hattingen) is a German art historian and museum curator, best known for his books Die große Bertelsmann-Lexikothek. 18: Spektrum der Kunst (1989), Oskar Kokoschka: Leben und Werk (2003), Aus der Nähe: mein Leben mit Künstlern 1950 - 2000 (2014), Carl Otto Czeschka: ein Wiener Künstler in Hamburg (2019), and Kontinuität und Innovation: Bausteine für eine Ikonologie der Moderne (2022). He was awarded the Joost van den Vondel Prize by the Alfred Toepfer Foundation in 1996.

== Bibliography ==
- Spielmann, Heinz; Kokoschka, Oskar (1989). Die große Bertelsmann-Lexikothek. 18: Spektrum der Kunst. Gütersloh: Bertelsmann-Lexikothek-Verl. ISBN 978-3-570-03898-7.
- Spielmann, Heinz (2003). Oskar Kokoschka: Leben und Werk. Köln: DuMont. ISBN 3-8321-7320-X.
- Spielmann, Heinz (2014). Aus der Nähe: mein Leben mit Künstlern 1950 - 2000. Wachholtz, Murmann Publ. ISBN 978-3-529-03433-6.
- Spielmann, Heinz; Häussler, Hella; Joppien, Rüdiger; Czeschka, Carl Otto (2019). Carl Otto Czeschka: ein Wiener Künstler in Hamburg. Göttingen: Wallstein Verlag. ISBN 978-3-8353-3434-2.
- Spielmann, Heinz (2022). Kontinuität und Innovation: Bausteine für eine Ikonologie der Moderne. Berlin: Deutscher Kunstverlag. ISBN 978-3-422-98842-2.
