= Larisa Shchiryakova =

Belarusian journalist

Larisa Shchiryakova (Russian: Лариса Щирякова) is a Belarusian journalist who freelances for Belsat.

== Career ==
Shchiryakova has been implementing European Commission civil society projects in Belarus since 2009. She worked with a youth group, Talaka, to create and disseminate communally-oriented videos in Gomel city. Despite the apolitical nature of her work [?], government authorities have targeted her in a larger campaign of press censorship. Police detained her along with 34 others on 13 July 2011 for her reporting. In August 2012, police detained Schiryakova and three others after they tried to videotape a cultural festival. On 22 October 2012, the regional prosecutor's office summoned her on suspicion of working for a foreign media outlet without government accreditation. The summons followed Shchiryakova's public comments criticizing the state's treatment of Viasna Human Rights Centre personnel. The State Security Committee (KGB) detained her in December 2014. In January 2015, Shchiryakova and Konstantin Zhukovsky were fined 900,000 rubles for participating in a picket in Svietlahorsk, which they had covered in the media. On 8 March 2015, she was brought before police authorities again for illegally interviewing businessmen on camera, asking about the effects of new taxes on entrepreneurs. She was fined $3.6 million rubles on 12 March. Gomel City Court found her guilty of violating Article 22.9 of the Criminal Code, "illegal dissemination of media products," on 13 January 2016. She was fined $250.

Larisa Shchiryakova was detained in December 6, 2022, after a search of her home. Her son was taken to a shelter on the same day. The ex-husband of the political prisoner took the son on December 23. Later it became known that a criminal case was opened against Shchyrakova under Article 369-1 of the Criminal Code ('Discrediting the Republic of Belarus'). On August 31, 2023, Larisa was sentenced to three years and six months of imprisonment in a general-security penal colony. Some of her property was seized. She was also fined. Viasna declared her a political prisoner. On September 11, 2025, after being pardoned, she was de-facto deported to Lithuania along with fifty other Belarusian political prisoners.
