= Dünyamalılar =

- Municipality
- Location within Azerbaijan
- Coordinates: 39°46′22″N 47°45′32″E
- Country: Azerbaijan
- Rayon: Beylagan

Population
  - Total: 5,968
- Time zone: UTC+4 (AZT)
  - Summer (DST): UTC+5 (AZT)

Dünyamalılar (also, Dun’yamalylar, Dünyamallar, and Dunyamallar) is a village and municipality in the Beylagan Rayon of Azerbaijan. It has a population of 5,968.
