= Victoria Ivleva =

Russian photographer and political activist

- Russian: Виктория Марковна Ивлева-Йорк
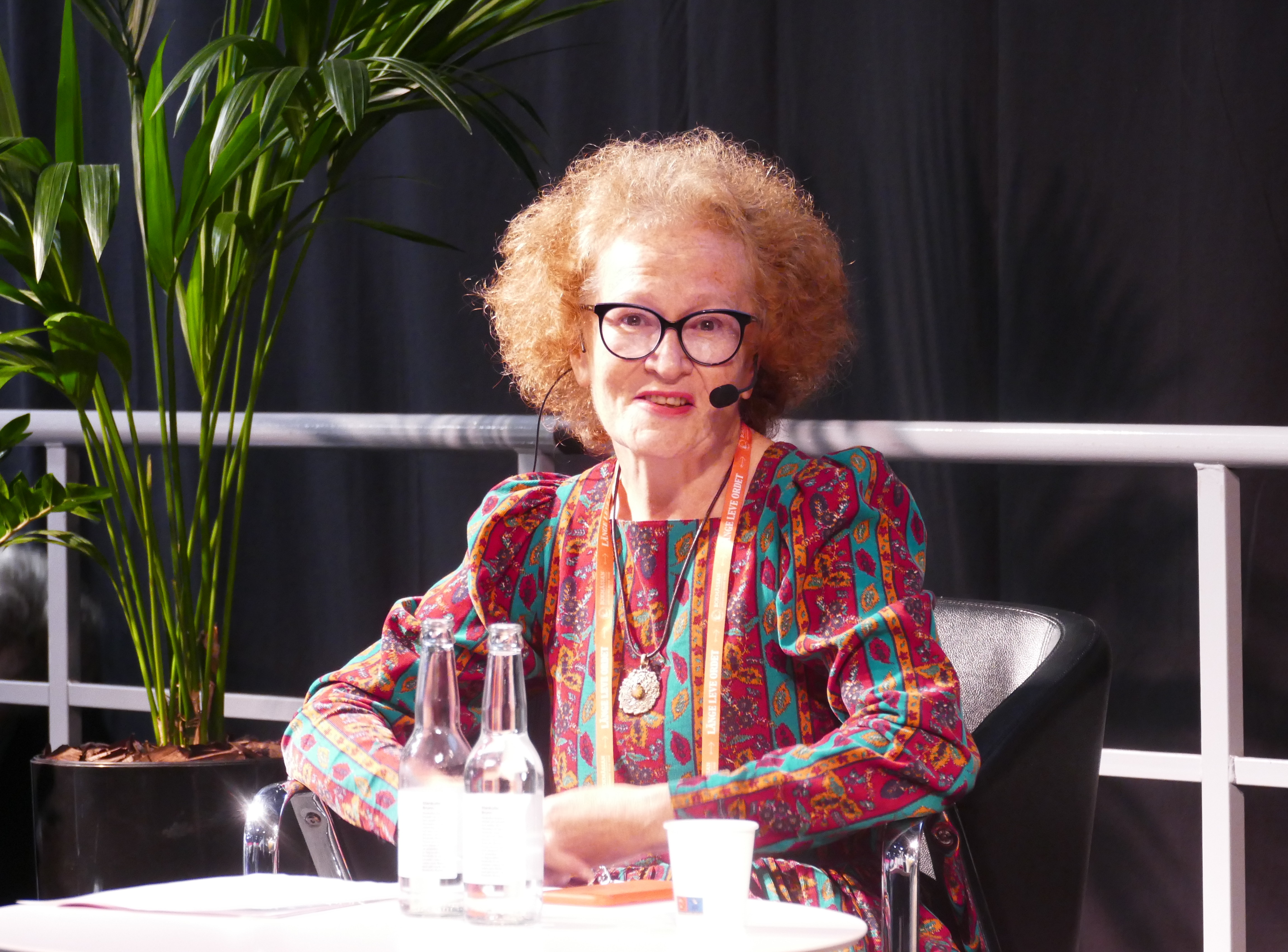
- Ivleva in 2023
- Born: June 1, 1956 (age 70); Leningrad, Russian SFSR, Soviet Union (now Saint Petersburg, Russia
- Occupations: photographer and political activist
- Style: black-and-white photography
- Awards: World Press Photo of the Year (Science & Technology)

Victoria Markovna Ivleva-York (Russian: Виктория Марковна Ивлева-Йорк; born June 1, 1956) is a Russian photographer and political activist. In 1992 she was awarded the World Press Photo of the Year award in the Science & Technology category for her series of photographs taken on 1 January 1991 of the Chernobyl plant. She prefers to take photographs in black-and-white.

Her photographs of Africa, taken after convincing the Minister of Emergency Situations, to let her travel to Rwanda, were exhibited in the Voznesensky Center in Moscow in May 2021. In November 2021 she was detained by police in Moscow for her single person protests in Pushkin Square in support of the Russian human rights organisation Memorial.

== Chernobyl ==
In 1991 Ivleva accompanied workers dealing with the aftermath of the Chernobyl disaster of 1986. She became friendly with physicists working in Chernobyl and they subsequently allowed her to photograph the destroyed nuclear reactor of the Chernobyl Nuclear Power Plant. Ivleva never felt her photographs of Chernobyl were her best work and described their attraction as the juxtaposition of "a little person and that vast, terrible space". Ivleva was the recipient of a 1992 World Press Photo of the Year award in the Science & Technology category for her series of photographs taken on 1 January 1991 of the Chernobyl plant. Ivleva said of her time in the reactor that "You've no time inside, every thought is a rem", referring to the rems of deadly radiation that are emitted by the nuclear reactor. Ivleva said that when she got a dose of radiation from the reactor she initially felt sleepy before later wanting to return. Ivleva said of her photographs of Chernobyl that " ... just a tiny sunbeam breaking through the sarcophagus – that bit of nature – can change the most ugly creation of human beings".

== Other work and activism ==
Ivleva travelled to Rwanda in 1994. The Russian government had initially told her that she could not travel there as she was a woman, and the political situation in Rwanda was too dangerous. Ivleva subsequently convinced the Minister of Emergency Situations, Sergei Shoigu, to let her travel. Her photographs of Africa were exhibited in the Voznesensky Center in Moscow in May 2021.

Ivleva has described herself as "an activist, not an activist-journalist, but an activist as a person". She protested on Pushkin Square in Moscow for the release of the Ukrainian filmmaker Oleg Sentsov and bought food for captured Ukrainian sailors held in the Lefortovo Prison. In 2021 Ivleva described the ongoing Russo-Ukrainian War as her "deepest pain" as to "fight a war with a close neighbor and close friend is a tragedy. If we had a normal government, the first thing we'd do would be to stop the war, get down on our knees before them for what we did to them, pay them reparations, and ask them for forgiveness" and that she felt it was "so obvious that Ukraine is weaker and it's their land". Ivleva was detained by police in Moscow in November 2021 for her single person protests in Pushkin Square in support of the Russian human rights organisation Memorial. She was subsequently fined 150,000 rubles and found guilty of violating the laws on public gatherings.

Ivleva prefers to take photographs in black and white.
