= Muçu =

- Municipality
- Location within Azerbaijan
- Coordinates: 40°55′53″N 48°44′32″E
- Country: Azerbaijan
- Rayon: Quba

Population
  - Total: 437
- Time zone: UTC+4 (AZT)
  - Summer (DST): UTC+5 (AZT)

Muçu (also, Muchu) is a village and municipality in the Quba Rayon of Azerbaijan. It has a population of 437.
