= Brestskiy Kurier =

- Type: Weekly newspaper
- Format: A3
- Editor: Nikolay Aleksandrov
- Founded: 1990
- Political alignment: democratic
- Headquarters: Brest, Belarus
- Circulation: 8,000
- Website: www.bk-brest.by

Brestskiy Kurier (Russian: Брестский курьер, translated as Brest Courier) is a weekly Belarusian newspaper founded in 1913 under the name Brest-Litovskiy Kurier, and re-founded in 1990 as Brestskiy Kurier. The paper is distributed in Brest and Brest Region.

== History ==
Brestskiy Kurier dates back to 1906 when it was distributed under the name Brest-Litovskiy Kurier. In this form the paper had existed until 1915 when Brest-Litovsk was occupied by the German troops during the World War I. Brest-Litovskiy Kurier was being issued daily, twice: in the morning and in the evening. Notably, such high circulation was achieved in a city with a population of 50 thousand.

The first issue of the reestablished Brestskiy Kurier came out in June 1990 and was printed in Vilnius. In 1999, the newspaper received an award in the category The Young Press of Eastern Europe by the ZEIT-Stiftung foundation. In 2017, the weekly circulation was 2,500 copies.

In 2018, the printed version of the publication ceased to exist.

In July 2023, the newspaper's website was added to the list of extremist materials.

== Format ==
Brestskiy Kurier comes out weekly on Wednesdays. It is usually 32 pages long.

== Content ==
Brestskiy Kurier covers all the main regional events and publishes the news, editorials, investigative reporting, analytical reviews, letters to the editor, as well as sections on culture, sports and crime.

== Literature ==
Республика Беларусь: Энциклопедия в 6 т. Vol. 2: А — Герань. Минск: Белорусская энциклопедия имени Петруся Бровки. 2006. ISBN 985-11-0341-1.
