= Vitebskiy Kurier =

Russian-language newspaper in Vitebsk, Belarus

- Language: Russian
- Website: vkurier.by

Vitebskiy Kurier (Russian: Витебский Курьер) is a Russian language newspaper published in Vitebsk, Belarus.

At the end of August 2020, by order of the Ministry of Information of the Republic of Belarus, access to the website of the publication http://vkurier.by/ in the country was restricted due to coverage of the 2020 Belarusian protests by the website. In January 2022, the Vitebsk Courier Internet resources were included in the republican list of extremist materials.

== Literature ==
Витебский курьер М // Беларуская энцыклапедыя: У 18 т. / Рэдкал.: Г. П. Пашкоў і інш.. — Мн.: БелЭн, 1997. — Т. 4: Варанецкі — Гальфстрым. — С. 202. — 480 с. — ISBN 985-11-0090-0 (т. 4), ISBN 985-11-0035-8.
