= ZEIT-Stiftung =

Foundation

ZEIT-Stiftung Ebelin und Gerd Bucerius
- Founded: 1971
- Founder: Gerd Bucerius
- Type: Charitable foundation
- Purpose: science, culture, education
- Location: Hamburg, Germany
- Region served: worldwide
- Key people: Chairman of the Board Manuel J. Hartung Chairman of the Board of Trustees Burkhard Schwenker
- Revenue: 31.7 million € (2022)
- Endowment: 810.7 million € (2022)
- Employees: 38 (2022)
- Volunteers: 0
- Website: zeit-stiftung.de

The charitable foundation Zeit-Stiftung Ebelin und Gerd Bucerius (house style: ZEIT STIFTUNG BUCERIUS) is registered in Hamburg. Its aim is to fund projects in research and scholarship, arts and culture, as well as education and training. It was founded in 1971 by Gerd Bucerius and carries the name of the founder, the title of the weekly newspaper Die Zeit, which he co-founded, and the nickname of his second wife, Gertrud Ebel, Ebelin.

== Early projects of the founder ==
The first scholarships in the 1970s were awarded to young journalists, to enable them to study at Harvard University in Cambridge/US as part of the ZEIT Fellowship programme. In the 1980s, Gerd Bucerius began to actively support stronger competitiveness in higher education in Germany, and gave substantial funds to the private University Witten/Herdecke. In order to promote Hamburg's literary scene, the foundation acquired a villa on the Outer Alster Lake. The Literaturhaus Hamburg opened in 1989, and since then the foundation has made the venue available rent free to the City of Hamburg and the organization Literaturhaus-Verein. In the 1990s, the foundation increased its investments in academia and set up the Gerd Bucerius-Juraprogramm a scholarship programme for young lawyers. Until the death of Gerd Bucerius, the foundation funded 90 individual projects with a total of 15 million euros. Upon the deaths of the founder in 1995 and of his wife in 1997, the couples' entire private assets were bequeathed to the foundation. Over the past ten years, the foundation has provided a total of 162 million euros in grants.

== Organization ==
The statutory organs consist of a Board of Directors and a Board of Trustees. Following the death of the founder, Michael Göring was appointed Executive Director in 1997; he has been President of the Board 2005 up to 2021. His successor, Manuel J. Hartung, took up his duties as Chairman of the Foundation's Board of Directors at the end of 2021. Achim Lange has been Financial Director since 2021. Manfred Lahnstein has been acted as Chairman of the Board of Trustees in the years 1995 up to 2019. Burkhard Schwenker has been Chairman since 2020.

== Mission statement ==
The mission statement of the foundation opens with the following words: 'Civil society is called upon to find solutions to the many challenges in the present and future. In the tradition of its founders, Ebelin and Gerd Bucerius, Zeit-Stiftung is part of the liberal and cosmopolitan civil society it wishes to promote.'

== Conditions for grants ==
The foundation focuses on funding projects that it has initiated, but also gives grants to outside applicants, preferably in Hamburg, and provided they fit the aims and criteria for funding. In 2022 the foundation was able to dispose of revenues of 21.7 million euros. As one of the largest privately funded foundations in Germany with assets of 1.03 billion euros (end of financial year 2023). ZEIT STIFTUNG BUCERIUS has been able to establish institutions of its own. A large part of the annual budget is allocated to the independent institutions Bucerius Law School and Bucerius Kunst Forum.

== Projects (overview) ==
=== Research and scholarship ===
Bucerius Law School in Hamburg was established in 2000 and has since then been funded solely by the foundation as a private law school. Furthermore, the Zeit-Stiftung aims to provide funding and grants to 'young, gifted, international researchers engaged in interdisciplinary studies'. The foundation also supports projects in the humanities and social sciences with a focus on Hamburg and Haifa.

=== Arts and culture ===
With its own exhibition space, the Bucerius Kunst Forum established in 2002, the foundation supports the Stiftung Hamburger Museen (foundation of Hamburg museums), especially projects aimed at archiving and presenting their collections. Other aims are to promote 'the diversity of cultural forms of communication and presentation in music, literature, and theatre'. Conservation projects in North and East Germany are also part of the foundation's activities.

=== Education and training ===
A central aim of the foundation is to 'promote equal opportunities in education', especially during transitions from international reception classes to regular school classes as well as from primary to secondary education. The foundation also invests in lifelong learning. In view of the demographic changes ahead, this is 'the key to helping individuals improve their life and work chances'.

=== Politics and Society ===
The foundation aims to promote public debates on current issues and critical analysis of controversial political and social topics. The 'Bucerius Summer School' and the 'Asian Forum' provide networking opportunities for young leaders. Supporting independent journalism in Eastern Europe is another area of investment.

=== Bucerius Lab ===
The 'Bucerius Lab' examines the 'effects of digitization' in public discussions and at conferences.

== Publications ==
The foundation's own publication series 'Hamburger Köpfe' aims to portray 'groundbreaking Hamburg personalities'. The volumes are published by Ellert & Richter Verlag. Bucerius Law School and Bucerius Kunst Forum also produce their own publications.
