= Mücü =

- Municipality
- Location within Azerbaijan
- Coordinates: 40°47′00″N 48°24′40″E
- Country: Azerbaijan
- Rayon: Ismailli

Population
  - Total: 229
- Time zone: UTC+4 (AZT)
  - Summer (DST): UTC+5 (AZT)

Mücü (also, Myudzhyu) is a village and municipality in the Ismailli Rayon of Azerbaijan. It has a population of 229.
