= Maymun II of Derbent =

Maymun II

Emir of Derbent
- Reign: 20 August 1075 – c. December 1075
- Predecessor: Abd al-Malik III
- Successor: (emirate ends; Sau-tegin as Seljuk governor)
- Born: 457 AH (1064/1065 CE); Derbent
- House: Hashimids
- Father: Mansur II
- Religion: Islam

Maymun ibn Mansur (Arabic: ميمون بن منصور; born 1065), known as Maymun II, was the last recorded Hashimid emir of Derbent, proclaimed at the age of eleven in August 1075 and ruling for about four months. He was the posthumous son of Mansur II and, through his grandmother Shamkuya, a great-grandson of the Shirvanshah Yazid ibn Ahmad. His brief emirate was followed by the third and most thorough Seljuk occupation of the city, after which the Ta'rikh Bab al-abwab — the sole source for the dynasty — breaks off.

== Birth ==
Maymun was born in 457 AH (1064/1065 CE), in the house of the chief Ibn Abi-Yahya, whose daughter was his mother. His father, the emir Mansur II, had been assassinated shortly before by the chief Mufarrij ibn Muzaffar, who broke in on him as he woke on the estate of Samsuya near Masqat and had him cut down with swords and daggers; the murderers then rode into Derbent by night, seized Maymun's grandmother Shamkuya and imprisoned her, and set their ghulams to plunder the town.

== Accession ==
For a decade after Mansur's death the emirate was held, with many interruptions, by Maymun's cousin Abd al-Malik ibn Lashkari, while Derbent passed repeatedly between the chiefs, the Shirvanshah Fariburz I (who appointed his son Afridun) and the Seljuks.

In August 1075 the people of Derbent withdrew their allegiance from Abd al-Malik and expelled him. He went, as was his custom, to Khaydaq to seek reinforcements, but the Derbentis followed him, caught him and imprisoned him in the town of al-Humaydiya in upper Tabasaran. On 20 August 1075 they swore allegiance to Maymun, then eleven years old, and lodged him in the government building.

Vladimir Minorsky judged that the choice of Maymun, a grandson of the Shirvanian princess, must have eased relations with Fariburz, while embarrassing Mufarrij, who had murdered the boy's father.

== End of the emirate ==
In December 1075 Ahmad ibn Ali, a ghulam of the emir of the two Iraqs, arrived at Derbent as the sultan's envoy and announced that the March had been granted to Sau-tegin; his name was thereafter read in the khutbah from the pulpits of the March after that of the sultan. Minorsky described this as the third period of Seljuk occupation and the most radical of the three, and considered that it put a temporary stop to Shirvan's long-standing ambition to annex Derbent.

The chronicle states that Maymun's emirate lasted about four months, and the compiler Münejjim Bashi adds that he could not ascertain whether Maymun afterwards recovered the emirate, nor whether any other Hashimid ruled after him. The Ta'rikh Bab al-abwab ends in 468 AH (1075/1076 CE), as do its chapters on Shirvan and Arran, and Minorsky remarked that its readers are left in the dark as to the end of Fariburz, of Abd al-Malik and of Mufarrij alike. Nothing further is recorded of Maymun.

== Aftermath ==
After the deaths of Nizam al-Mulk and Malik-Shah the local Seljuk dynasties fell to fighting among themselves, and emirs of Derbent are heard of once more, as the Shirvanshahs likewise re-emerged from a period of obscurity. The traveller Abu-Hamid al-Gharnati, who visited the city at some point between 1130 and 1150, names the local amir as Sayf al-Din Muhammad ibn Khalifa al-Sulami; Minorsky considered the nisba characteristic and took it to suggest that this Muhammad continued the line of the Sulami Hashimids, or else descended from one of the chiefs.

== Sources ==
- Minorsky, Vladimir (1958). A History of Sharvān and Darband in the 10th-11th Centuries. Cambridge: W. Heffer & Sons.

Preceded by Abd al-Malik III	Emir of Derbent; 1075	Seljuk occupation; end of the Hashimid dynasty
