= Abd al-Malik II of Derbent =

Emir of Derbent between 1034-1043

Abd al-Malik II

Emir of Derbent
- Reign: 1034 – 10 March 1043
- Predecessor: Mansur I
- Successor: Mansur II
- Vizier: Saqlab ibn Muhammad
- Died: 10 March 1043
- Spouse: Shamkuya
- Issue: Mansur II; Lashkari
- House: Hashimids
- Father: Mansur I
- Religion: Islam

Abd al-Malik ibn Mansur (Arabic: عبد الملك بن منصور), known as Abd al-Malik II, was the Hashimid emir of Derbent from 1034 until his death in 1043. He spent his reign contending with the Shirvanshahs for control of the city and with its entrenched oligarchy of chiefs (ru'asa) for control of its government, and attempted to resolve both problems at once by marrying the Shirvanid princess Shamkuya in 1035.

Almost everything known of Abd al-Malik's reign derives from the Ta'rikh Bab al-abwab, an anonymous history of Derbent compiled about 1106 and preserved in quotations by the 17th-century Ottoman compiler Münejjim Bashi. Vladimir Minorsky read this marriage as a deliberate reversal of his predecessors' policy: where earlier emirs had resisted the oligarchy of the chiefs and the territorial ambitions of Shirvan by leaning on mercenaries and the petty kings of Dagestan, Abd al-Malik chose instead to make himself the Shirvanian candidate at Derbent. The chiefs recognised the danger immediately, and their hostility outlasted his reign, his son's and his widow's.

== Background ==
Abd al-Malik was the son of Mansur ibn Maymun ibn Ahmad, who had come to the emirate in 393 AH (1002/1003 CE) and ruled for thirty-seven years. His father's reign had been dominated by a long contest with the Shirvanshah Yazid ibn Ahmad, who deposed him in 410 AH (1019/1020 CE) and again in 414 AH (1023/1024 CE), each time taking Derbent for himself, and who had earlier executed Mansur's brother Abu-Nasr; on each occasion Mansur recovered the city, the last time in 415 AH (1024/1025 CE). In 416 AH (1025/1026 CE) he married Sariya, daughter of Bukht-Yisho, the lord of Sarir, and in 423 AH (1031/1032 CE) he led the ghazis of Derbent and the March against the Rus returning from a raid on Shirvan, cutting them off in the defiles and recovering their plunder. He died in 425 AH (1033/1034 CE).

== Reign ==
On his father's death the oath was sworn to Abd al-Malik, but his tenure was brief: the people of Derbent deposed him and expelled him from the town on 9 February 1034. The country was delivered to the Shirvanshah Abu-Mansur Ali ibn Yazid, who had himself taken the Shirvanian throne that year by murdering his brother Manuchihr. The Shirvanshah was brought into Derbent, repaired the citadel, installed his vizier Mansur ibn Musaddid in the government building as his lieutenant and returned to his capital; the chronicle dates the arrangement to 426 AH (1034/1035 CE).

In April 1035 Abd al-Malik returned to Derbent, killed Mansur ibn Musaddid and besieged the citadel, which capitulated to him on 12 May 1035 through the mediation of the chief Ali ibn Hasan ibn Anaq; its Shirvanian garrison returned home. Having recovered his principality, Abd al-Malik made peace with the Shirvanshah and married his sister Shamkuya, daughter of Yazid ibn Ahmad; the marriage was consummated in December 1035. Minorsky judged that the emir had decided to turn a new leaf, assuming the role of the Shirvanian candidate himself rather than continuing his predecessors' struggle against Shirvan.

The chiefs saw at once how far the marriage strengthened the emir's position, and feared for their own. Ali ibn Hasan ibn Anaq, together with Mufarrij, Abul-Fawaris and Abu Amr, the sons of the recently deceased Muzaffar ibn Aghlab, attacked with their followers, entered the house of the emir's vizier Saqlab ibn Muhammad and murdered him there; the chronicle describes the victim as a man of generous disposition and praiseworthy conduct. Fearing for himself and his family, Abd al-Malik left Derbent secretly by night and fled to Shirvan.

The next day the people of Derbent took counsel and sent the chief Ali ibn Aghlab and Abu-Abdillah ibn Abd al-Aziz to Shirvan to conciliate the emir and persuade him to return. The Shirvanshah arrested both envoys and imprisoned them in one of his castles, while Abd al-Malik went back to the March, repaired the citadel and fortified himself in it with his family and his ghulams. Mufarrij ibn Muzaffar went to Shirvan as a hostage in place of his uncle Ali ibn Aghlab, but the Shirvanshah imprisoned him too, and released all of them only after obtaining formal undertakings that they would obey Abd al-Malik. Minorsky observed that the marriage, instead of diminishing the causes of friction with Derbent, increased them, because the chiefs regarded the princess as a Trojan horse moved into position by the Shirvanshah.

Abd al-Malik remained entrenched in the citadel while the intrigues of the chiefs continued. In 429 AH (1037/1038 CE) the people of Shandan attacked the town and the March; some were taken prisoner and others killed, and several Muslims lost their lives. In 430 AH (1038/1039 CE) the chief Ali ibn Hasan ibn Anaq revolted, besieged the emir in the citadel and led a party from Derbent against Shabaran in Shirvan, but withdrew without success. In the same year a son, Mansur, was born to Abd al-Malik and Shamkuya in the castle of Shabaran.

In 432 AH (1040/1041 CE) the people of Khaydaq took the citadel of Derbent and captured both the emir and his wife, dismantling its middle wall. In the same year Ali ibn Hasan ibn Anaq led the people of Derbent on a campaign against Shandan. The chiefs afterwards expelled Shamkuya to Shirvan, while Derbent was attacked by the neighbouring tribes of Shandan and Khaydaq.

The chronicle's two chapters date the seizure of Shamkuya differently. The chapter on Derbent places it in 433 AH (1041/1042 CE), when Abd al-Malik left the March for al-Muhraqa for fear of the chiefs and the townspeople seized his wife and sent her to her brother the Shirvanshah Qubad; Abd al-Malik returned to Derbent later that year, whereupon the chiefs withdrew to Kurak, and Shamkuya came back from Shirvan in 434 AH (1042/1043 CE). The chapter on Shirvan places the same events in 436 AH (1044/1045 CE), with Qubad imprisoning his sister in a castle, then freeing her and restoring her to her husband in 437 AH (1045/1046 CE). The two accounts are irreconcilable as Qubad came to the throne only in 435 AH (1043/1044 CE), which favours the later dating, yet Abd al-Malik was dead by March 1043.

== Death and succession ==
Abd al-Malik died on 10 March 1043, after a reign of about nine years. His son Mansur, then a child of four, was proclaimed emir a week later, with the chief Abul-Fawaris Abd al-Salam ibn Muzaffar ibn Aghlab, one of the men who had murdered his father's vizier, as regent; Shamkuya remained at her son's side, and Minorsky considered her an energetic and able influence on his long struggle with the chiefs. A second son, Lashkari, born of a different mother, was raised to the emirate by the chiefs in 1054 in opposition to Mansur, and was murdered by Mansur's ghulams in January 1055; Lashkari's own son Abd al-Malik III was installed as emir in 1065 after Mansur's assassination.

== Historiog ==
Minorsky considered the years between 400 AH (1009/1010 CE) and 468 AH (1075/1076 CE) to fall within the limits of the author's own experience and the recollections of his immediate ancestors, and regarded the detailed accounts of Abd al-Malik's son Mansur and of the Shirvanshah Fariburz I as having the character of a contemporary report. He also noted that the author's sympathies lie with the local princes of Derbent and against the turbulent aristocracy of the town, although his narration is in general dispassionate.

== Sources ==
- Minorsky, Vladimir (1958). A History of Sharvān and Darband in the 10th-11th Centuries. Cambridge: W. Heffer & Sons.

Preceded by Mansur I	Emir of Derbent; 1034–1043	Succeeded by Mansur II
