= Hashimids (Darband) =

Hashimids آل هاشم
- Daghestan and Shirvan in the medieval Islamic era
- Parent house: clients (mawali) of the Banu Sulaym
- Country: Emirate of Derbent
- Founded: 869
- Founder: Hashim ibn Suraqa
- Final ruler: Maymun II
- Titles: Emir of Derbent
- Dissolution: 1075
- Deposition: Seljuk occupation of Derbent

The Hashimids (Arabic: آل هاشم, romanized: Āl-i Hāshim) were a local dynasty that ruled Derbent — the Bab al-Abwab of the Arabic sources — and its frontier districts from 869 until 1075. Clients (mawali) of the Arab tribe of Banu Sulaym, they took power as the authority of the Abbasid Caliphate weakened after the murder of the caliph al-Mutawakkil, and held the city, with many interruptions, for slightly more than two centuries.

Derbent under their rule was the northernmost Muslim province of the north-west, commanding the pass between the Caucasus and the Caspian, and was both a fortress of the ghazis and an important centre of the overland and Caspian trade. To its north lay territory more or less controlled by the Khazars, where from the 9th century the Rus and the Slavs began to appear; in the mountains various peoples remained independent; to the south lay Arran and Shirvan.

== Origins ==
The family's ancestors were not Arabs of the Banu Sulaym but clients of that tribe. They are attested at Derbent nearly a century before the dynasty's foundation: according to al-Ya'qubi, the lord of the city under Harun al-Rashid was Najm ibn Hashim, whom the caliphal governor Sa'id ibn Salm al-Bahili put to death after the townspeople attacked his financial agent. Najm's son Hayyun revolted and appealed to the Khazar khagan, whose army inflicted great damage on the Muslims and advanced as far as the Araxes — a calamity, wrote al-Tabari, without parallel in Islamic times. Order was eventually restored by Yazid ibn Mazyad al-Shaybani, the founder of the Shirvanshah line.

Ibn A'tham al-Kufi gives a fuller account in which the quarrel arose over taxation: Derbent had never been taxed on account of its exposed position and its people's war against the Khazars, and the revolt was provoked when Sa'id's agents attempted to levy on it. Vladimir Minorsky observed that the chronicler of Derbent, who is favourable to the Hashimids, passes over this episode in their antecedents.

== Foundation and rule ==
After the murder of al-Mutawakkil in 861 the caliphate was thrown into confusion by the Turkish clients who seized control of the administration, and the people of Derbent and the ghazis of the Marches appointed Hashim ibn Suraqa, a great-grandson of Hayyun, as their emir in 869. The chronicle praises him for acting only in consultation with the wise men and the chiefs, and for undertaking nothing except what they had agreed upon. About the same period the Yazidids established themselves in Shirvan, and the Shaddadids would follow in Arran about 951.

Claude Cahen described the dynasty's history as marked by the continual intervention of Caucasians, Khazars, Rus, Slavs, Shirvanians and Georgians in shifting alliances and oppositions, sometimes as mercenaries, suggesting an ethnic mixture in which no one group effectively dominated the others. Within the state there was constant struggle between the factions of the tribes under their chiefs, the ghazis — volunteers for the holy war drawn from many places — and the urban population, organised in craft and professional guilds and led, as elsewhere in the north-west, by ru'asa who were able to make and unmake rulers. The dynasty was further troubled by conflicting claims to the succession between the eldest surviving member of the ruling clan and the sons of the deceased emir.

== The chiefs ==
The ru'asa of Derbent enjoyed a more important position than their counterparts elsewhere in the region, and in the first half of the 11th century the family of the Aghlabids stood at the centre of events. Different versions of the Darband-nama preserve the claim that the descendants of Aghlab al-Sulami had held hereditary office in the city since the Umayyad period as deputies (khalifa), commandants of the fortified town (amin, later darugha) and commanders of the troops (sar-lashkar) and that the keys of one of the gates were reserved to them. Minorsky judged that the Ta'rikh Bab al-abwab, being a history of the emirs, gives the Aghlabids no title beyond ra'is and may have played down the privileges that accounted for their claims. In his view this evidence throws an entirely new light on the institutions of Derbent, which weakened the emir's position and transformed him into a hereditary president of an aristocratic republic, the struggle continuing between the citadel, from which the emir tried to rule the town, and the chiefs who did not want him.

The pattern is visible throughout the dynasty's history. On the death of Abd al-Malik I in 939 the chiefs expelled his infant son Ahmad and installed in turn a lord of Tabasaran, a lieutenant of the Shirvanshah and a king of the Lakz before restoring him in 954; they reduced Maymun I to a figurehead at his accession in 976; they raised Lashkari II against Mansur II in 1054; and their leader Mufarrij ibn Muzaffar had Mansur assassinated in 1065.

== Relations with neighbours ==
The emirs fought and allied with the powers of the mountains — Sarir, Shandan, Khaydaq and the Lakz — and with the Shirvanshahs to the south, who occupied Derbent repeatedly. Hashim raided Sarir in 876 and 878; Muhammad I beat off a Khazar attack in 901 and was captured by treachery by the lord of Sarir in 905; and in 909 or 912 he and the Shirvanshah Ali ibn Haytham were defeated at Shandan and taken prisoner with ten thousand men, of whom those held by Sarir were freed without ransom while the captives of Shandan and the Khazars were sold.

Maymun I, imprisoned by his own chiefs, sought help from the Rus, who came in eighteen ships in 987; the townspeople massacred the crew that landed, but Maymun retained a body of Rus retainers whom Minorsky described as forming a kind of druzhina about him, and whom he refused to surrender to the preacher Musa al-Tuzi even at the cost of his throne. Mansur I married a daughter of the Christian ruler of Sarir in 1025 and in 1032 ambushed the Rus in the passes as they returned laden with plunder from Shirvan. Abd al-Malik II reversed the family's traditional hostility to Shirvan by marrying the Shirvanid princess Shamkuya in 1035, a step that Minorsky read as making him the Shirvanian candidate at Derbent and that the chiefs resented for three decades afterwards.

== Decline and end ==
The murder of Mansur II in 1065 was followed by a decade in which Derbent passed repeatedly between the chiefs, the Shirvanshah Fariburz I and the Seljuks. The boy emir Abd al-Malik III was installed, expelled and recalled four or more times, depending on the support of Khaydaq and the kings of the mountains while his rival Mufarrij leaned on Sarir — a state of affairs in which, as Minorsky remarked, Derbent had largely lost its character as an outpost of Islam.

There were three Seljuk occupations: an expedition under Sau-tegin in 1068, the seizure of the town and citadel by Yaghma in 1071 after Manzikert, and finally, after the four-month emirate of Maymun II in 1075, a more thorough settlement in which the khutbah was read in the names of the sultan and of Sau-tegin. Minorsky considered that this put a temporary stop to Shirvan's long-standing ambition to annex Derbent. The Ta'rikh Bab al-abwab breaks off in 1075, and its compiler could not establish whether any Hashimid ruled afterwards.

== Later princes ==
Minorsky emphasised that the princes of Derbent do not in fact disappear in 1075, and Cahen likewise notes that the family long remained influential in local affairs. Abu-Hamid al-Gharnati, visiting between 1130 and 1150, names the amir as Sayf al-Din Muhammad ibn Khalifa al-Sulami, whose nisba Minorsky thought characteristic; Ibn al-Azraq al-Fariqi met a malik of Derbent, Abu'l-Muzaffar, in 1154, married to a daughter of the Georgian king Demetrius I. Coins published by Yevgeni Pakhomov attest Muzaffar ibn Muhammad ibn Khalifa (1160–1164), Bek-Bars ibn Muzaffar and Abd al-Malik ibn Bek-Bars.

Minorsky read these names as pointing in more than one direction: Muzaffar recalls the Banu Muzaffar, the family of the chief Mufarrij, and Khalifa may echo the hereditary office reserved to the chiefs, while Abd al-Malik looks like a throw-back to the Hashimids. Khaqani, addressing Muzaffar, told him he was of Arab origin by nature and birth, which Minorsky took to mean a descendant of the Banu Sulaym.

== List of emirs ==
Emir	Reign	Relationship
Hashim ibn Suraqa	869–884	founder
Umar ibn Hashim	884–885	son of Hashim
Muhammad I	885–915	son of Hashim
Abd al-Malik I	916–939	son of Hashim
Ahmad ibn Abd al-Malik	939; 941; 954–976	son of Abd al-Malik I
Maymun I	976–990; 990–991; 992–997	son of Ahmad
Muhammad II	997	son of Ahmad
Lashkari I	998–1002	son of Maymun I
Mansur I	1003–1019; 1021–1023; 1024–1034	son of Maymun I
Abd al-Malik II	1034–1043	son of Mansur I
Mansur II	1043–1054; 1055–1065	son of Abd al-Malik II
Lashkari II	1054–1055	son of Abd al-Malik II
Abd al-Malik III	1065; 1068; 1070–1075	son of Lashkari II
Maymun II	1075	son of Mansur II

Derbent was also held during these years by rulers from outside the family: Haytham ibn Muhammad of Tabasaran (939–941 and 942), a lieutenant of the Shirvanshah (942–953), Khashram Ahmad ibn Munabbih of the Lakz (953–954), the Shirvanshahs Muhammad III, Yazid II and Fariburz I at various dates, and the Seljuk commanders Sau-tegin and Yaghma.

== Sources ==
Almost everything known of the dynasty comes from an anonymous history of Derbent composed about 1106, the Ta'rikh Bab al-abwab, which survives only in quotations made by the 17th-century Ottoman compiler Münejjim Bashi in his Saha'if al-akhbar and was edited and translated by Minorsky in 1958. Cahen notes that the dynastic succession is confirmed by coin evidence. Minorsky held that the years between 1009 and 1075 fell within the limits of the author's own experience and the recollections of his immediate ancestors, and that his sympathies lay with the local princes and against the turbulent aristocracy of the town, though his narration is in general dispassionate.

== Bibliography ==
- Cahen, Claude (1984). "Āl-e Hāšem". Encyclopædia Iranica. Vol. I. p. 758.
- Madelung, Wilferd (1975). "The minor dynasties of northern Iran". In Frye, R. N. (ed.). The Cambridge History of Iran, Volume 4: From the Arab Invasion to the Saljuqs. Cambridge: Cambridge University Press. pp. 243–249.
- Minorsky, Vladimir (1958). A History of Sharvān and Darband in the 10th-11th Centuries. Cambridge: W. Heffer & Sons.
