= Abd al-Malik III of Derbent =

Abd al-Malik III

Emir of Derbent
- Reign: May 1065 – c. November 1065
- Predecessor: Mansur II
- Successor: Afridun I (Shirvanian occupation)

Emir of Derbent
- Reign: 27 October 1068 – December 1068
- Predecessor: Aghlab ibn Ali (Seljuk lieutenant)
- Successor: Afridun I (Shirvanian occupation)

Emir of Derbent
- Reign: 1070 – 1071
- Predecessor: Afridun I
- Successor: Afridun I

Emir of Derbent
- Reign: c. 1071 – August 1075
- Successor: Maymun II
- Born: 1055; Khaydaq
- Died: after August 1075
- House: Hashimids
- Father: Lashkari II
- Religion: Islam

Abd al-Malik ibn Lashkari (Arabic: عبد الملك بن لشكري; born 1055), known as Abd al-Malik III, was the Hashimid emir of Derbent in four or more separate periods between 1065 and 1075, the last effective ruler of his dynasty. Raised to the emirate as a boy by the city's chiefs after the murder of his cousin Mansur II, he was repeatedly expelled and recalled as Derbent passed back and forth between the chiefs, the Shirvanshah Fariburz I and the Seljuks. He was deposed for the last time in August 1075 and imprisoned, and his fate afterwards is unknown.

== Birth and accession ==
Abd al-Malik was born in 446 AH (1054/1055 CE) at Khaydaq, the son of the emir Lashkari ibn Abd al-Malik and of a local woman whom his father had married; his father was murdered in January of that year by ghulams of his half-brother Mansur II. The boy was brought up in Khaydaq in the household of Piruz ibn al-Sakban.

When Mansur II was assassinated in February 1065 by the chief Mufarrij ibn Muzaffar, Fariburz I marched on Derbent to avenge his kinsman. In April 1065 Mufarrij took refuge with the lord of Sarir and returned with him to the outskirts of the city, whereupon the nobles of the Marches and the chiefs came out, made peace with him and swore fealty in his presence to Abd al-Malik, then a boy — the chronicle says of six years, though Vladimir Minorsky noted that he must have been ten or eleven. Mufarrij also swore allegiance, and in May 1065 the chiefs brought the boy into Derbent and set him on the throne of the emirate in the house of Aghlab ibn Ali, until such time as he should be able to direct affairs himself. Aghlab, born in 425 AH (1033/1034 CE), had been Abd al-Malik's tutor.

Minorsky judged that by this election the chiefs eliminated the Shirvanian protectorate they dreaded and set up a new puppet on the throne of the emirate, and that the choice was the less welcome to Fariburz because Lashkari had been the opponent of Mansur, the son of the Shirvanian princess Shamkuya.

== First depositions ==
Mufarrij's ascendancy did not last. He brought Mamlan ibn Yazid, the Shirvanshah's uncle, into the town and installed him in the castle of Abu'l-Abbas, then went with him to Masqat to collect the harvest and appealed for help to his father-in-law, the lord of Sarir. With Sarir's support he drove the Shirvanians out of Masqat, but when he and the lord of Sarir moved on Shabaran its people resisted and defeated them; Mufarrij was captured with a party of men from Derbent and Sarir and taken in chains to the Shirvanshah. Derbent was surrendered to Fariburz, who repaired the citadel and garrisoned it, and Abd al-Malik was deposed after ruling six months. Piruz ibn Saknan took him back to Khaydaq.

There followed a period in which, as the chronicle puts it, Derbent was ruled now by the Shirvanshah and his lieutenants and now by the chiefs under Mufarrij, backed by his father-in-law of Sarir. The situation changed with the arrival of the Seljuks. Alp Arslan came to Arran in the autumn of 1067, where the lords of Arran and Shirvan waited on him, and in 1068 campaigned in Georgia with Sau-tegin in his van, returning after five months by way of Ganja and Barda; Minorsky concluded that it was on this occasion that the sultan sent his chamberlain Sau-tegin with a detachment to Derbent, together with the chief Aghlab ibn Ali, whom the Shirvanshah had imprisoned and the sultan had freed. He described the expedition as the first, temporary Seljuk attempt to establish authority at Derbent. The Turks took Masqat and devastated it, took the citadel from the Shirvanians and dismantled its middle wall, took the town from the chiefs, and Sau-tegin appointed Aghlab as his lieutenant before rejoining the sultan.

== Return and expulsion ==
Fighting then broke out between Aghlab's followers and Mufarrij's, and continued until Abd al-Malik arrived on 27 October 1068, accompanied by men from the outlying districts and by the kings of the mountains. They encamped outside the town on Tall al-Fursan, the Horsemen's Hill, and all the inhabitants of the March came out and swore allegiance to him for the second time and proclaimed him, after which they brought him into the March and lodged him in the military camp by the Citadel Gate.

In November 1068, his relations with Alp Arslan having improved, Fariburz marched on Derbent on the pretext that his fugitive brother Guzhdaham had taken asylum with the chiefs. A series of battles was fought against Abd al-Malik's army of men from Derbent and Khaydaq, in all of which fortune turned against the Shirvanshah. Then Mufarrij went over to Fariburz with his followers, because, in Minorsky's reading, Abd al-Malik was supported by his rival Aghlab; the men of Derbent were consequently defeated, but those of Khaydaq stood firm, and seeing their steadiness the Derbentis returned to the fight and routed the Shirvanians with heavy losses. Mufarrij seized the citadel while its holders were off their guard and fortified himself there, and daily fighting followed between his men and those of the emir and Aghlab, until Aghlab died on 28 December 1068 at the age of thirty-eight. Mufarrij was left victorious, Abd al-Malik's affairs fell into confusion and he fled once more to Khaydaq. Fariburz then occupied both the town and the citadel, left his son Afridun there and returned to Shirvan, taking most of the chiefs with him in chains.

== Last years of the emirate ==
In 463 AH (1070/1071 CE) the struggle between Shirvan and Arran flared up, and the name of the ruler of Arran, Fadl ibn Shavur, was for a time read in the khutbah at Derbent before the two princes made common cause the following year. In the same year, after the sultan's return to Iraq, the people of Derbent recalled Abd al-Malik from Khaydaq, brought him into the town and entrusted the emirate to him, and he continued to fight the Shirvanians with varying success. In 464 AH (1071/1072 CE) the inhabitants expelled him and surrendered the town to the Shirvanshah; the chronicle then states that they brought him back and turned him out again. In the same year Alp Arslan, returning from his victory over the emperor Romanos IV Diogenes in September, sent his Turkish ghulam Yaghma to the March, and Yaghma took both the town and the citadel from the Shirvanians. This was the second Seljuk occupation of Derbent; local intrigues nevertheless continued unabated, and Abd al-Malik, hostile to Shirvan, was several times brought back from his retreat in Khaydaq, while Mufarrij found his own interest in maintaining the understanding with Fariburz that he had begun in 1068.

In August 1075 the people of Derbent withdrew their allegiance from Abd al-Malik and expelled him. He went to Khaydaq to seek reinforcements for his return, as was his custom, but the Derbentis followed him, caught him and imprisoned him in the town of al-Humaydiya, in upper Tabasaran west of Derbent. On 20 August 1075 they swore allegiance to his cousin Maymun ibn Mansur, the posthumous son of Mansur II, then eleven years old, and lodged him in the government building.

== Sources ==
- Minorsky, Vladimir (1958). A History of Sharvān and Darband in the 10th-11th Centuries. Cambridge: W. Heffer & Sons.

Preceded by Mansur II	Emir of Derbent; 1065	Succeeded by Fariburz I
Preceded by Aghlab ibn Ali	Emir of Derbent; 1068	Succeeded by Fariburz I
Preceded by Fariburz I	Emir of Derbent; 1070–1075	Succeeded by Maymun II
