= Mansur II of Derbent =

Ruler of Derbent from 1043 to 1065

Mansur II

Emir of Derbent
- Reign: 18 March 1043 – 22 September 1054
- Predecessor: Abd al-Malik II
- Successor: Lashkari II
- Regent: Abul-Fawaris Abd al-Salam ibn Muzaffar ibn Aghlab (1043–1051)

Emir of Derbent
- Reign: 1 July 1055 – 10 February 1065
- Predecessor: Lashkari II
- Successor: Abd al-Malik III
- Born: c. 1039; Shabaran, Shirvan
- Died: February 10, 1065 (aged 25–26); Samsuya, near Masqat
- Burial: Shirvan
- Spouse: a daughter of Ali ibn Hasan ibn Anaq (m. 1064)
- Issue: Maymun II
- House: Hashimids
- Father: Abd al-Malik II
- Mother: Shamkuya
- Religion: Islam

Mansur ibn Abd al-Malik (Arabic: منصور بن عبد الملك), known as Mansur II (c. 1039 – 10 February 1065), was the Hashimid emir of Derbent from 1043 until his assassination in 1065, with an interruption in 1054–1055. The son of the emir Abd al-Malik II and of the Shirvanid princess Shamkuya, he succeeded at the age of four and spent his reign in a prolonged struggle against the city's entrenched oligarchy of chiefs (ru'asa), which ended when their leader Mufarrij ibn Muzaffar had him killed.

Vladimir Minorsky described his reign as a turning point in the history of the Emirate of Derbent, and one that the Ta'rikh Bab al-abwab documents in unusual detail.

== Early life ==
Mansur was born in 430 AH (1038/1039 CE) in the castle of Shabaran, the son of Abd al-Malik ibn Mansur ibn Maymun and of Shamkuya, daughter of the Shirvanshah Yazid ibn Ahmad. Through his mother he was a first cousin of the Shirvanshah Fariburz I. His parents' marriage in 1035 had aligned the emirate with Shirvan and, in Minorsky's reading, made his father the Shirvanian candidate at Derbent, which the chiefs resented lastingly.

Abd al-Malik died on 10 March 1043, and Mansur was proclaimed emir on 18 March 1043 at the age of four; the nobles and the commoners swore fealty to him. Minorsky noted that the chiefs did not oppose the accession because they counted on the emir's youth, even though his mother remained at his side. Power lay with the regent, the chief Abul-Fawaris Abd al-Salam ibn Muzaffar ibn Aghlab, until his death in 443 AH (1051/1052 CE), after which Mansur ruled in his own right.

== Deposition and restoration ==
On 24 July 1054 fighting broke out between the emir on one side and the townspeople and the chiefs on the other, and on the night of 3 August 1054 Mansur and his mother left Derbent secretly for al-Muhraqa nearby. He raised a large force from Derbent and Tabasaran and attacked the gate of the March on 8 August; the chiefs and notables came out to meet him, and in the fighting at the Palestine gate his army was defeated. On 22 September 1054 the chiefs and townspeople brought his half-brother Lashkari ibn Abd al-Malik to the government building and recognised him as emir in Mansur's place.

Lashkari ruled until the night of 3 January 1055, when he was murdered in his house by ghulams of Mansur. In the same year a son, Abd al-Malik, was born to him at Khaydaq of a local woman he had married. On 1 July 1055 the people of Derbent brought Mansur back to the March through the mediation of the lord of Sarir and renewed their oath of allegiance to him, but in the conduct of affairs he remained subordinate (maghlub) to the chiefs.

== Struggle with the chiefs ==
Mansur's position changed at the beginning of 1064, when he appealed to his neighbours for help against the chiefs. A large number of people from Khaydaq and elsewhere came to his assistance, and with their help he fought the chiefs on 3 January 1064; the inhabitants of Derbent deserted the chiefs, went over to the emir and submitted to him. Minorsky judged that Mansur, probably assisted by his mother, had succeeded in separating the townspeople from the aristocratic chiefs.

The chiefs responded by turning to outside force. At their instigation the lord of Sarir assembled a large body of infidels and various Turks, marched on Derbent and encamped at Dimishq on 13 June 1064, sending his army up to the gate of the town and driving off the herd grazing at the Jihad gate. Mansur rode out with his companions; according to the chronicle the attackers numbered more than 4,000 horsemen against 200 Muslims mounted and on foot, and neither side dared begin the attack until a hundred men arrived from Tabasaran to help, whereupon the herd was recovered and the army of Sarir was driven off and returned defeated to its master. The chiefs and their followers kept away from the fighting, and not only disobeyed the emir but incited the enemy against him.

Three days later, on 16 June 1064, the chief Ali ibn Hasan ibn Anaq died in Derbent and was buried in his house. The chronicle records that he had inherited the chiefdom from his ancestors, possessed the intrepidity of kings and the gravity of sultans, was feared by kings and emirs, influential in speech and victorious in war, and that after his death the position of the chiefs became less secure. Minorsky observed that this chief had kept the balance between the emir and the aristocracy, and that his death gave the signal for further unrest.

In June 1064 Mufarrij ibn Muzaffar ibn Aghlab left Derbent with his clan, his family, the other chiefs and their ghulams and followers, withdrawing first to al-Muhraqa and then to the estates lying "between the two rivers". Mansur rode out with the nobles of the March to the Muhraqa gate; the two parties clashed, and the emir was defeated and barely escaped with his life. The Ghumiq took advantage of the rift to raid the villages of Derbent, killing many of the Muslim inhabitants, looting their property and imposing the kharaj on the survivors. In July 1064 the chiefs sent their ghulams to drive off the townspeople's cattle and raided the suburb repeatedly, and in August they moved from al-Muhraqa to Kurak in the territory of the Lakz, seized all the estates of Masqat and the land "between the two rivers", and tightened the blockade of the March so that nobody could enter or leave it.

It was in the midst of these events that Mansur married the daughter of the late Ali ibn Hasan ibn Anaq. Her mother was a daughter of the emir of Khaydaq, and reinforced by his father-in-law's ghulams Mansur held the chiefs off for some days.

== Reconciliation and assassination ==
In 457 AH (1064/1065 CE) Mufarrij asked Haytham ibn Maymun, the chief of the tanners, to mediate between himself and the emir so that he might return with his clan and followers to his home. He said that he had grown old and regretted what he had done, and blamed himself for living among the Lakz as an adventurer in his old age. Mansur took this for the truth and a genuine effort to improve relations, not knowing, in the chronicler's words, how much falsehood and estrangement lay in their hearts. Haytham composed the discord, and Mansur gave the chiefs a favourable answer, forgave them by a solemn oath and firm agreement, and guaranteed their persons, their property and their followers.

In December 1064 Mansur went out to meet the returning exiles and brought them back with honour, requiring them to swear that they would not betray him and would obey him. According to the chronicle he trusted their promises and was lulled into a false sense of security; on 7 February 1065 they persuaded him to ride out with them to Masqat, on the pretext of stopping Kurdish raiders from molesting the peasants and sharecroppers of the district.

While Mansur was on the estate of Samsuya near Masqat, Mufarrij broke in on the emir as he woke and was sitting on his bed; the attackers killed him with swords and daggers on 10 February 1065, and his body was sent to Shirvan for burial. He was 25 years old and had reigned 23 years, though the chronicle notes that some gave the figure as 18. Minorsky described the killing as a treacherous ruse by a man who had despaired of prevailing otherwise, and who afterwards coerced the lower classes of Derbent that had supported the emir against the aristocracy.

Having killed Mansur, Mufarrij and the other chiefs of his house rode with their ghulams into the March in the middle of the night, before the population knew what had happened. They seized his mother Shamkuya and imprisoned her, looted the government building and ordered their ghulams to plunder the town.

== Aftermath ==
The murder was followed by widespread disorder in Derbent, and Kurdish raiders attacked Masqat and its villages. A posthumous son, Maymun, was born to Mansur in the house of the chief Ibn Abi-Yahya.

The Shirvanshah Fariburz I, Mansur's cousin, with whom he had been on consistently peaceful terms, treated the killing as a matter for revenge. Once he had settled his quarrel with Abu'l-Aswar Shavur ibn Fadl, he marched on Derbent, killed many of the chiefs, seized their property and drove off their herds; he also occupied Masqat and raided the surrounding countryside repeatedly. In April 1065 Mufarrij went to Sarir and returned with the army of its ruler, whose daughter he had married. The nobles and chiefs then made peace and swore fealty to Abd al-Malik ibn Lashkari, the son of Mansur's half-brother by a woman of Khaydaq, who was installed as emir in the house of Aghlab ibn Ali in May 1065. The chronicle calls him a boy of six, but Minorsky noted that he was born in 446 AH (1054/1055 CE) and must have been ten or eleven. Minorsky wrote that by this election the chiefs eliminated the Shirvanian protectorate they feared and installed a new puppet; the choice was unwelcome to Fariburz because Lashkari had been Mansur's opponent. Abd al-Malik was deposed after six months when Derbent was surrendered to the Shirvanshah, and was taken to Khaydaq by Piruz ibn Saknan.

Mansur's line briefly recovered the emirate a decade later. In 468 AH (1075/1076 CE) the people of Derbent imprisoned Abd al-Malik at Humaydiya and proclaimed his cousin Maymun, Mansur's posthumous son and Shamkuya's grandson. The appointment eased relations with Fariburz but embarrassed Mufarrij, who had murdered Maymun's father. Maymun ruled only four months.

== Sources ==
- Minorsky, Vladimir (1958). A History of Sharvān and Darband in the 10th-11th Centuries. Cambridge: W. Heffer & Sons.

Preceded by Abd al-Malik II	Emir of Derbent; 1043–1054	Succeeded by Lashkari II
Preceded by Lashkari II	Emir of Derbent; 1055–1065	Succeeded by Abd al-Malik III
