= Shamkuya =

Wife of the emir of Derbent Abd al-Malik II

- Emira of Derbent
- Died: October 1067; Gulistan
- Burial: Shabaran
- Spouse: Abd al-Malik II
- Issue: Mansur II
- House: Yazidids
- Father: Yazid ibn Ahmad
- Religion: Islam

Shamkuya bint Yazid (died October 1067), also spelt Shamakuya or Shakmuya, was a princess of the Shirvanshahs of the Yazidid house and, by marriage, the wife of the Hashimid emir of Derbent (al-Bab) Abd al-Malik II. A daughter of the Shirvanshah Yazid ibn Ahmad, she was married in 1035 as part of a settlement between Shirvan and al-Bab, and after her husband's death in 1043 remained at the side of her son Mansur through his long and troubled reign. She was seized or imprisoned by the chiefs of al-Bab at least three times, was twice released to her Shirvanshah kinsmen, and died in 1067 at the Gulistan castle in Shirvan.

== Life ==
Shamkuya was a daughter of the Shirvanshah Yazid ibn Ahmad (r. 991–1027) and a sister of the Shirvanshahs Manuchihr I, Abu-Mansur Ali II, Qubad and Sallar.

In 425 AH (1033/1034 CE) Shamkuya's brother Abu-Mansur Ali ascended the throne of Shirvan, ousted Abd al-Malik from al-Bab, occupied the town, rebuilt the citadel and left his vizier Mansur ibn Musaddid there as his lieutenant. Abd al-Malik overpowered the Shirvanian garrison in April 1035, killed the vizier and recovered the town and citadel, whereupon he made peace with the Shirvanshah and married his sister Shamkuya; the marriage was consummated in December 1035.

Minorsky read the match as a deliberate change of policy on the amir's part: where his predecessors had struggled against the oligarchy of the chiefs and the territorial appetite of Shirvan by leaning on mercenaries and the petty kings of Dagestan, Abd al-Malik chose instead to turn a new leaf by marrying the Shirvanian princess, thereby assuming the role of the Shirvanian candidate himself. The chiefs of al-Bab recognised the danger at once. Seeing how the amir's position was strengthened by the marriage tie, Ali ibn Hasan ibn Anaq, Mufarrij, Abul-Fawaris and Abu Amr, the sons of Muzaffar ibn Aghlab, attacked with their followers, entered the house of the amir's vizier Saqlab ibn Muhammad and murdered him with their daggers. Fearing for himself and his family, Abd al-Malik left the town secretly by night and fled to Shirvan. When the people of al-Bab sent two of their elders to persuade him to return, the Shirvanshah seized the envoys and put them in fetters, and then helped his brother-in-law to recover his principality.

=== Captivities ===
A son, Mansur, was born to the couple in 430 AH (1038/1039 CE) in the castle of Shabaran. In 432 AH (1040/1041 CE) the people of Khaydaq took the citadel of al-Bab and captured both Abd al-Malik and Shamkuya, dismantling the middle wall of the citadel.

The chiefs of al-Bab afterwards expelled Shamkuya to Shirvan. According to the chapter on al-Bab this happened in 433 AH (1041/1042 CE), when Abd al-Malik left the March for fear of the chiefs and the people of al-Bab seized his wife and sent her to her brother the Shirvanshah Qubad; she returned from Shirvan to al-Bab in 434 AH (1042/1043 CE), and the amir died on 10 March 1043 after a reign of about nine years. The chapter on Shirvan places the same events in 436 AH (1044/1045 CE), when the chiefs attacked the amir and captured his wife, whom they sent to Qubad; the Shirvanshah imprisoned her in a castle, then freed her and in 437 AH (1045/1046 CE) restored her to her husband. The two accounts cannot both be right: Qubad only came to the throne in 435 AH (1043/1044 CE), which favours the later dating, yet Abd al-Malik was dead by March 1043.

Abd al-Malik died on the eve of Friday 25 Rajab 434 AH (10 March 1043), and his son Mansur, then a child of four, was proclaimed amir on 18 March 1043; the nobles and commoners took the oath of fealty "and everybody was pleased with his accession". The chiefs, reckoning on the youth of the amir, did not object even though his energetic mother stayed with her child. Real power laid with the regent Abul-Fawaris Abd al-Salam ibn Muzaffar ibn Aghlab until his death in 443 AH (1051/1052 CE), after which Mansur became an independent ruler.

In July 1054 fighting broke out between the amir on one side and the population and the chiefs on the other, and on 3 August 1054 Mansur and his mother secretly left the town for al-Muhraqa near al-Bab. He gathered a large force from al-Bab and Tabasaran and attacked the gate of the March on 8 August, but was defeated in violent fighting at the Palestine gate, and on 22 September 1054 the chiefs invited his half-brother Lashkari to replace him. Lashkari was killed by one of Mansur's ghulams in 446 AH (1054/1055 CE) and Mansur returned with the help of the Saririans, securing the support of Khaydaq and other neighbours and renewing his struggle against the chiefs. Minorsky judged that it was probably with the assistance of his able mother that Mansur succeeded in separating the townsmen from the aristocratic chiefs.

=== Imprisonment and release ===
On 10 February 1065 the head of the chiefs, Mufarrij ibn Muzaffar, murdered Mansur on the estate of Samsuya belonging to Masqat, striking him down with swords and daggers as he sat on his bed newly woken from sleep; his body was sent to Shirvan for burial. The murderers rode at once into the March in the middle of the night and seized Shamkuya, imprisoning her and looting the government building. A posthumous son, Maymun, was born to Mansur shortly afterwards in the house of the chief Ibn Abi-Yahya.

Shamkuya's nephew, the Shirvanshah Fariburz I, did not let the murder of his cousin pass unpunished. He summoned his army and marched on al-Bab to take revenge for his kinsman, occupying Masqat and raiding the countryside; Minorsky notes that on the Darband side Fariburz is represented as moved by affection for his cousin, the son of his aunt Shamkuya. In the course of these operations the chiefs congregated and released Shamkuya from her prison, handing her over to the Shirvanshah with her property, and peace was made.

She was seized again, or remained in confinement, for in the following year the pressure had to be renewed. In early July 1065 Fariburz, encamped on the bank of the Samur, sent his raiding parties against Derbent; the people of al-Bab were hard pressed, and freed his paternal aunt from prison and sent her to him accompanied by the faqihs and with her property and heavy baggage, after which Fariburz returned home.

== Death ==
Shamkuya died in October 1067 at Gulistan, and her body was carried to Shabaran and laid in her father's mausoleum.

== Legacy ==
Vladimir Minorsky, who edited the Ta'rikh Bab al-abwab in which almost all the information about her is preserved, judged that her marriage, instead of reducing the friction between Shirvan and al-Bab, increased it, since the chiefs of al-Bab regarded the princess as "a Trojan horse moved into position by the sharvanshah"; he also described her as the energetic and able mother of her son. Their hostility outlived her husband and her son. When the chiefs elected a new amir in 1065 they eliminated, in Minorsky's words, the dreaded Shirvanian protectorate and set a new puppet on the throne of the amirate; the appointment was the more unwelcome to Fariburz because the late Lashkari had been an opponent of Mansur, the son of the Shirvanian princess.

Her line nevertheless returned to the amirate after her death. In 468 AH (1075/1076 CE) the people of al-Bab imprisoned Abd al-Malik ibn Lashkari at Humaydiya and proclaimed his cousin Maymun, Shamkuya's grandson, an appointment that must have eased relations with Fariburz while embarrassing Mufarrij, the murderer of Maymun's father; Maymun ruled only four months.

== Sources ==
- Minorsky, Vladimir (1958). A History of Sharvān and Darband in the 10th-11th Centuries. Cambridge: W. Heffer & Sons.
