= Mansur I of Derbent =

Emir of Derbent from 1003 to 1034

Mansur I

Emir of Derbent
- Reign: 1003 – 1019
- Predecessor: Lashkari I
- Successor: Yazid II of Shirvan

Emir of Derbent
- Reign: 1021 – 1023
- Predecessor: Yazid II of Shirvan
- Successor: Yazid II of Shirvan

Emir of Derbent
- Reign: November 1024 – 1034
- Predecessor: Yazid II of Shirvan
- Successor: Abd al-Malik II
- Died: 1034
- Spouse: Sariya (daughter of Bukht-Yisho of Sarir)
- Issue: Abd al-Malik II
- House: Hashimids
- Father: Maymun I
- Religion: Islam

Mansur ibn Maymun (Arabic: منصور بن ميمون), known as Mansur I, was the Hashimid emir of Derbent from 1003 until his death in 1034. His reign was dominated by a long contest with the Shirvanshah Yazid ibn Ahmad, who twice had him expelled from the city and twice occupied it himself, and by the defence of the northern frontier against the Rus and the Alans. To strengthen his position he allied himself with the Christian kingdom of Sarir, marrying the daughter of its ruler in 1025.

== Background and accession ==
Mansur was a son of the emir Maymun ibn Ahmad, who ruled Derbent for twenty-one years and died in February 997. Maymun was briefly succeeded by his brother Muhammad, who ruled ten months and eighteen days before being murdered by one of Maymun's ghulams in December 997, and then by Mansur's elder brother Lashkari, who ruled four years and died in September 1002.

The oath was taken to Mansur in 393 AH (1002/1003 CE), eight and a half months after Lashkari's death. In the same year the Shirvanshah Yazid ibn Ahmad killed Mansur's brother Abu-Nasr, whom he had held as a hostage since the time of their father Maymun, and did so, the chronicle says, without any apparent reason. According to the chapter on Shirvan, Abu-Nasr had been captured in battle at Shabaran in 999 and kept as a hostage after the peace; when the people of Derbent asked for his release so that they might make him emir, Yazid refused, demanded in exchange the right to rebuild the citadels of Derbent and Sul, and on being refused put him to death and buried him near the gate of Shabaran, whereupon the people of Derbent proclaimed his brother Mansur.

== Reign ==
In 410 AH (1019/1020 CE) the people of the March rose against Mansur, expelled him from the town and surrendered it to Yazid ibn Ahmad, who repaired the citadel and garrisoned it with his troops. Bukht-Yisho of Sarir supported Mansur, and the people of Derbent came to favour him as well, so that in 412 AH (1021/1022 CE) he entered the town and after a month recovered the citadel from the Shirvanians. He then sent a force drawn from the people of Derbent against Shirvan; the Shirvanians met it at the gates of Shabaran in 413 AH (1022/1023 CE), but neither side prevailed and the attackers returned home.

In 414 AH (1023/1024 CE) Mansur was expelled a second time and Derbent was again entrusted to the Shirvanshah, who restored the citadel and garrisoned it with his own men. In November 1024 Mansur re-entered the city and the oath was taken to him for the third time; after twenty days he recovered the citadel as well.

In 416 AH (1025/1026 CE) Mansur married Sariya, daughter of Bukht-Yisho, the lord of Sarir. Minorsky observed that where earlier emirs had leaned on mercenaries, this time the emir sought to lean on the king of Sarir, whose daughter was his wife. Sarir was a Christian kingdom in the mountains of Dagestan, whose people Minorsky identified with the Avars of the valley of the central Koysu. Its ruler professed Christianity according to al-Mas'udi and its subjects were Christians according to Ibn Rusta

In 423 AH (1031/1032 CE) Mansur led a large expedition with the ghazis of the Islamic frontier posts. The Rus had raided the territories of Shirvan, plundering and ruining them and killing or capturing a great many of the inhabitants; as they returned laden with booty and captives, the ghazis of Derbent and the March, with Mansur at their head, occupied the defiles and the roads, put them to the sword so that few escaped, and took from them all the plunder they had carried off from Shirvan.

The Rus and the Alans then combined to take revenge and set off together against Derbent and the March. In 424 AH (1032/1033 CE) they moved first against al-Karakh, held only by a small body of warriors under Khusrau and Haytham ibn Maymun al-Ba'i, the chief of the tanners; with the help of the people of al-Karakh they gave battle, and the chronicle records that God granted victory to the Muslims, that great havoc was wrought among the Alans and the Rus, that the lord of the Alans was driven from the gate of al-Karakh, and that the appetite of the unbelievers for these frontier posts was thereby extinguished altogether. Minorsky connected the part played by the people of al-Karakh with their conversion to Islam in 385 AH (995/996 CE) by Mansur's father Maymun, while noting that later events showed Islam sat lightly on them. He also thought that the leading role taken in the defence by the chief of the tanners might be explained by the control Derbent exercised at that period over this western outpost of its territory.

The two chapters of the chronicle do not agree about these raids. The chapter on Shirvan distinguishes a raid by the Rus in 421 AH (1030/1031 CE) from one by the Alans and the Saririans in 423 AH (1031/1032 CE), whereas the chapter on Derbent names only the Rus as the aggressors despoiled of their booty. Minorsky thought collusion between all the anti-Muslim elements entirely conceivable, but noted that the Saririans go unmentioned in the Derbent account, possibly because of Mansur's marriage ties.

== Death and succession ==
Mansur died in 425 AH (1033/1034 CE). The chronicle credits him with a reign of thirty-seven years, but Minorsky reckoned it at thirty-one, from 393 AH (1002/1003 CE) to 425 AH (1033/1034 CE). He was succeeded by his son Abd al-Malik. Almost everything known of Mansur's reign derives from the Ta'rikh Bab al-abwab, an anonymous history of Derbent compiled about 1106 and preserved in quotations by the 17th-century Ottoman compiler Münejjim Bashi. Minorsky held that the years between 400 AH (1009/1010 CE) and 468 AH (1075/1076 CE) fell within the limits of the author's own experience and the recollections of his immediate ancestors, and that the author's sympathies lay with the local princes of Derbent and against the turbulent aristocracy of the town, though his narration is in general dispassionate.

== Sources ==
- Minorsky, Vladimir (1958). A History of Sharvān and Darband in the 10th-11th Centuries. Cambridge: W. Heffer & Sons.

Preceded by Lashkari ibn Maymun	Emir of Derbent; 1003–1034	Succeeded by Abd al-Malik II
