= Lashkari II of Derbent =

Lashkari II

Emir of Derbent
- Reign: 22 September 1054 – 3 January 1055
- Predecessor: Mansur II
- Successor: Mansur II
- Died: 3 January 1055; Derbent
- Spouse: a woman of Khaydaq
- Issue: Abd al-Malik III
- House: Hashimids
- Father: Abd al-Malik II
- Religion: Islam

Lashkari ibn Abd al-Malik (Arabic: لشكري بن عبد الملك; died 3 January 1055), known as Lashkari II, was the Hashimid emir of Derbent for about three months over the winter of 1054–1055. He was raised to the emirate by the city's chiefs in place of his half-brother Mansur II, whom they had driven out, and was murdered in his own house by ghulams of the deposed emir.

== Background ==
Lashkari was a son of the emir Abd al-Malik II (r. 1034–1043). Vladimir Minorsky considered that he was probably born of a different mother from his half-brother Mansur, whose mother was the Shirvanid princess Shamkuya; the marriage of Abd al-Malik to Shamkuya in 1035 had made the emir the Shirvanian candidate at Derbent and was resented by the chiefs, who regarded the princess as a Trojan horse moved into position by the Shirvanshah.

== Reign ==
Mansur II had succeeded their father in 1043 as a child of four and, after the death of his regent in 1051, began to rule in his own right. On 24 July 1054 fighting broke out between the emir on one side and the townspeople and the chiefs on the other, and on the night of 3 August Mansur and his mother left Derbent secretly for al-Muhraqa nearby. He raised a force from Derbent and Tabasaran and attacked the gate of the March on 8 August, but was defeated in violent fighting at the Palestine gate.

On 22 September 1054 the chiefs and townspeople brought Lashkari to the government building and recognised him as emir in his half-brother's place, to the satisfaction of the nobles and the chiefs of the March.

His tenure was brief. On the night of 3 January 1055 he was treacherously murdered in his own house by ghulams of his brother Mansur. In the same year a son was born to him at Khaydaq, of a local woman he had married, and was named Abd al-Malik after his grandfather.

Derbent remained without an emir for six months. On 1 July 1055 the townspeople brought Mansur II back through the mediation of the lord of Sarir and renewed their oath of allegiance to him, though in the conduct of affairs he remained subordinate to the chiefs.

== Legacy ==
Lashkari's posthumous son was raised in Khaydaq, and after Mansur II was assassinated by the chief Mufarrij ibn Muzaffar in February 1065 it was he whom the nobles and chiefs chose as emir, installing him in the house of Aghlab ibn Ali in May 1065. Minorsky judged that by this election the chiefs eliminated the Shirvanian protectorate they feared and set up a new puppet, and that the choice was the less welcome to the Shirvanshah Fariburz I because Lashkari had been the opponent of Mansur, the son of the Shirvanian princess.

== Sources ==
- Minorsky, Vladimir (1958). A History of Sharvān and Darband in the 10th-11th Centuries. Cambridge: W. Heffer & Sons.

Preceded by Mansur II	Emir of Derbent; 1054–1055	Succeeded by Mansur II
