= Manuchihr II of Shirvan =

Manuchehr II
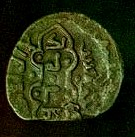
- Coin minted in the name of Manuchihr II (Hermitage Museum)

Shah of Shirvan
- Reign: 1096 – 1106
- Predecessor: Fariburz I
- Successor: Afridun I

Emir of Ganja
- Tenure: 1086 - 1096
- Predecessor: Fadl III
- Died: 1106
- Spouse: Rusudan
- House: Kasranid
- Father: Fariburz I
- Religion: Sunni Islam

Manuchihr II was the 17th shah of Shirvan. Azerbaijani historian Sara Ashurbeyli associated him with Al-Adud, a son of Fariburz I, who was mentioned by Masud ibn Namdar as an emir of Ganja. He might have started this tenure when Malik Shah removed Fadlun ibn Fadl from power in 1086. According to Dickran Kouymjian, he became shah in 1094.

His existence is only known from inscriptions and numismatic evidence.

Manuchihr II of Shirvan House of Shirvanshah Born: ? Died: 1106
Regnal titles
Preceded by Shirvanshah Fariburz	Shirvanshah; 1096-1106	Succeeded by Shirvanshah Afridun I
