= Fariburz I =

Ruler of Shirvan between 1063-1096

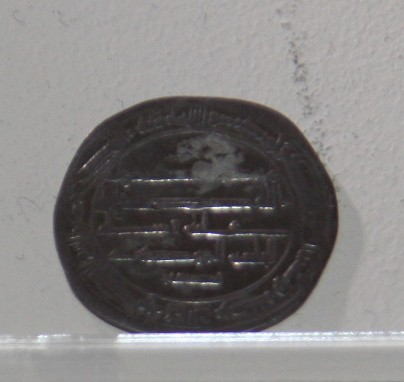
- Silver dirham of Fariburz I. Museum of History of Azerbaijan, Baku.

Shah of Shirvan
- Reign: 1063 – c. 1096
- Predecessor: Sallar
- Successor: Manuchihr II
- Vizier: Baha al-Din al-Kakuyi
- Died: between 1094 and 1096
- Spouse: Daughter of the Saririan king
- Issue: Manuchihr II; Afridun I
- House: House of Shirvanshah
- Father: Sallar
- Religion: Sunni Islam

Fakhr al-Din Fariburz ibn Sallar (Persian: فریبرز بن سالار), commonly known as Fariburz I (فریبرز), was the sixteenth Shah of Shirvan, reigning from 1063 until his death, which occurred between 1094 and 1096. His rule coincided with a profound reordering of power in the Caucasus, above all the advance of the Seljuqs, and he navigated it chiefly through negotiation, tribute and opportune alliance rather than open confrontation. Regarded as a ruler of considerable diplomatic skill, he presided over a realm that at its greatest extent reached from Mughan to Kumuk and Alania, and he spent much of his reign extending its borders at the expense of his neighbours.

== Reign ==
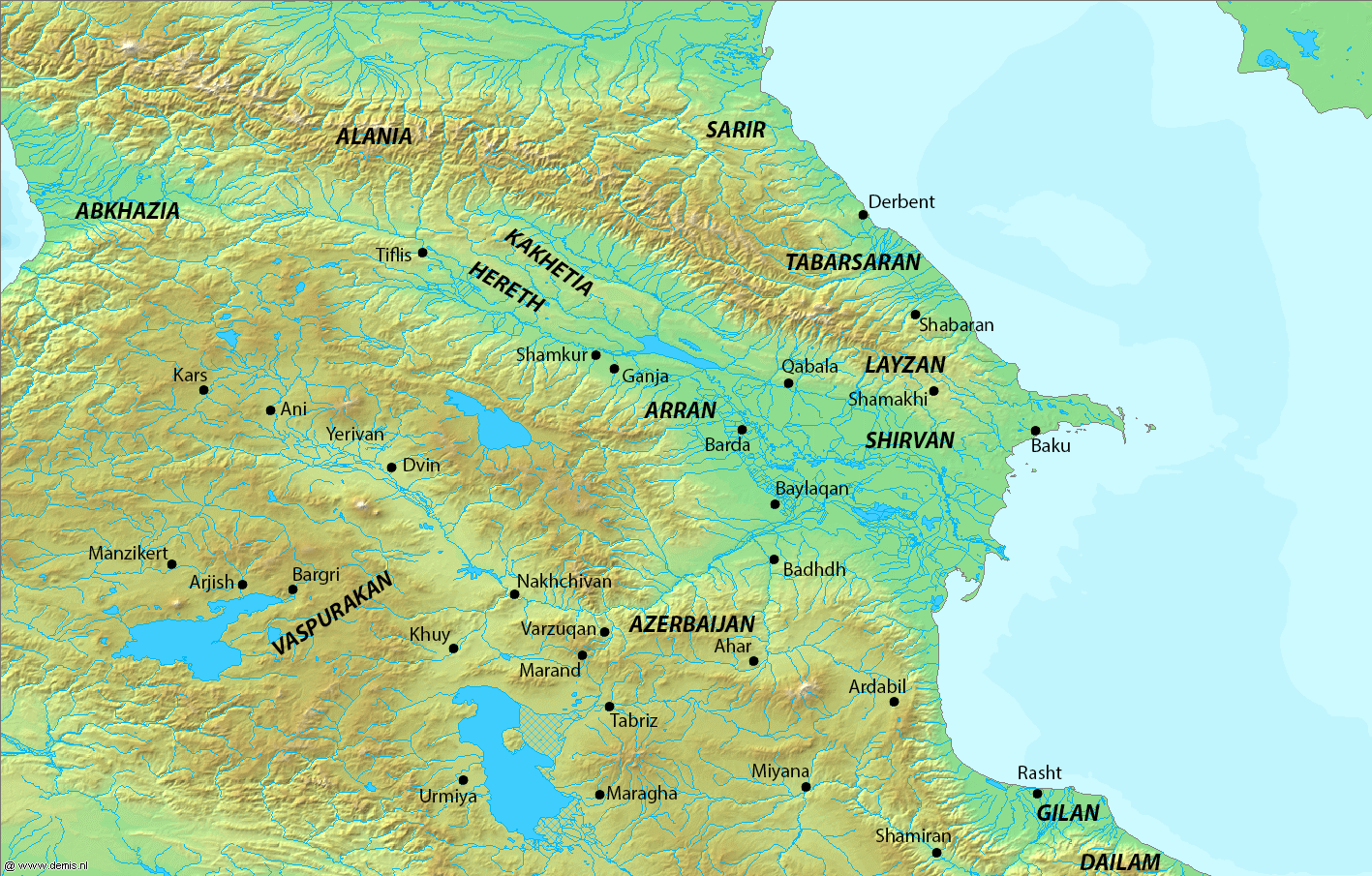
Map of the Caucasus and its surroundings

Fariburz succeeded to the throne on the death of his father Sallar on 20 February 1063, although he had in practice governed most of the kingdom during the latter years of his father's reign.

Within a month, in March, the Shaddadid ruler of Arran, Abu'l-Aswar Shavur I, invaded Shirvan, seized the fortress of Quylamiyan, garrisoned it and withdrew. The likeliest cause of the attack was Fariburz's decision to shelter Anushirvan ibn Lashkari, whom Abu'l-Aswar, his great-uncle, had deposed in 1049. Shavur soon returned and laid waste to the country, driving off the flocks and herds; the Shirvanians who opposed him were cut down, and many notables were taken prisoner and stripped of their possessions. He then encamped before the gates of the capital, Yazidiyya (Shamakhi), where, according to the Ta'rikh al-Bab, he collected his own daughter – the widow of the late Sallar – together with her money, goods and valuables, and returned with her to Arran.

In July 1063 Shavur invaded a third time, halting at the village of Sadun (identified by Sara Ashurbeyli with the present-day Sədan) and burning the crops, villages and estates around it. Unable to resist him, Fariburz dispatched his son Afridun, accompanied by Anushirvan, to seek help from the ruler of Sarir, Afridun's maternal grandfather. The appeal was refused, and after three months Afridun came home empty-handed.

In January 1064 Shavur mounted a fourth invasion, occupying several villages and districts, leaving part of his army behind under some of his emirs, and demanding 40,000 dinars. In Rajab of that year (June–July 1064) Fariburz concluded a peace with him: Shavur received the 40,000 dinars and in exchange restored Quylamiyan.

=== Hostilities with Derbent ===
In 1065 the townspeople of Derbent (al-Bab), led by the city's chiefs (ra'ises), rose in revolt and killed their ruler, the Hashimid emir Mansur ibn Abd al-Malik. Mansur was a cousin of Fariburz – the son of his paternal aunt – and had always lived at peace with him, and the Shirvanshah made the murder his pretext for war. He raided and destroyed the villages of al-Bab, and when the Derbentis resisted him near the Qalabad bridge as he reached the fortress of Mihyariya in Masqat, he defeated them with heavy slaughter. He then executed many of the ra'ises of al-Bab, plundered their property, drove off their herds and returned to Shirvan. Ashurbeyli reads the incessant clashes between the ra'ises, the emir of al-Bab and the Shirvanshah as evidence that, with the development of feudal relations in the second half of the 11th century, the urban elite had grown strong enough to fight the feudal rulers for independence in the government of the cities.

The Ta'rikh al-Bab records that on the last day of Rabi' II 457 (9 April 1065) Fariburz's cousin Hormuzd (son of Manuchihr I) died on his hereditary estate in Tabasaran and was buried there among his maternal uncles – evidence, as Ashurbeyli notes, that Tabasaran formed part of the Shirvanshahs' lands and was governed by their kinsmen. Later that year Fariburz returned with his army to Masqat, encamped on the banks of the Samur River, and in early July 1065 sent out raiding detachments against Derbent. The Shirvanshah withdrew only after the people of Derbent had released his paternal aunt Shamkuya from captivity and sent her to him, escorted by faqihs, together with all her property and valuables.

A certain Mufarrij ibn Muzaffar, styled "chief-of-chiefs of Derbent", thereupon sought help from the ruler of Sarir, who consented. Leading a force of his own men reinforced by Saririans, Mufarrij laid siege to Shabaran, but the Shirvanian regular army, aided by the townspeople, defeated him and took him prisoner. The people of al-Bab and their ra'ises then resolved to surrender the city to the Shirvanshah, who had the citadel repaired, strengthened with troops and stocked with provisions, while the emir of al-Bab, Abd al-Malik ibn Lashkari, withdrew to Haydaq. On 30 January 1066 Fariburz installed Afridun as governor of al-Bab, and the inhabitants received him with great ceremony.

The Ta'rikh al-Bab also preserves obscure notices of unrest in the Shirvanian capital itself. To suppress it Fariburz resorted to foreign troops. In April 1066, the chronicle relates, he grew wrathful against the people of his capital Yazidiyya and loosed the "infidel Georgians" upon them (one manuscript reads "the Khazars") who plundered the inhabitants and seized the Muslim ulama, ra'ises and notables; the Shirvanshah then ordered some of the captives executed with bound hands, others crucified, and the rest imprisoned until they had paid the arrears of the kharaj of past years.

=== Conflict with the Turks ===
A more formidable threat soon appeared in the form of the Oghuz Turks, who in 1066 raided Shirvan, plundering the encampments (hilal) of the Kurds and carrying off great booty in people, livestock and property. Fariburz attempted to buy them off, without success. On 22 November 1066 the Turkic warlord Qara-tegin descended on Shirvan a second time, now in alliance with Fariburz's paternal uncle Mamlan ibn Yazid, a rival claimant to the throne. Qara Tegin besieged Yazidiyya and ravaged its hinterland, then swept through the mountains and valleys of the country, killing great numbers, driving off the herds and enslaving women and children before descending on Baku and repeating the destruction there. So grave did the situation become that Fariburz sent his stud of more than 4,000 thoroughbred brood mares away to Masqat for safety. In January 1067, for reasons that are not recorded, he had a number of Shamakhi's inhabitants crucified, among them his own chamberlain (hajib), Lashkari ibn Rahman.

Qara-tegin's bands meanwhile plundered everything in their path from Baku to Shabaran, and he once more invested Yazidiyya. Fariburz's position worsened further when a fresh body of 2,000 Turkic troops arrived to reinforce the besiegers. These newcomers attempted a ruse: they sent word to Fariburz that "the Sultan has sent us to help thee and to drive Qara-tegin from thee", ostensibly arrested Qara-tegin and Mamlan, and invited the Shirvanshah to come and collect the prisoners. Fariburz saw through the stratagem and did not leave his residence. The Turks then released the two men and pressed on with the siege. To destroy his domestic enemy, Fariburz secretly paid 6,000 dinars to Savtegin, the chamberlain of the Seljuq sultan Alp Arslan, who was overlord of the Turkic bands ravaging the Caucasus.

The chamberlain accordingly invited Mamlan, then residing at the castle of Qalabad, to a feast. When Mamlan, having drunk heavily, was given leave to depart, he was waylaid on the road and killed, on the night of 24 February 1067, by three of Fariburz's men: his cousin Lashkarsitan (apparently a son of Abu'l-Aswar), his servant Shad-tekin and his chamberlain Namdar ibn Muzaffar. Mamlan's body was brought to Yazidiyya and buried there. The Turks thereupon crossed the Kura and withdrew with their booty, and in the same month the ruler of Qazvin, Erbasgan (or Elbasan) – a brother-in-law of Alp Arslan – sent officials to collect the annual tribute of 30,000 dinars that Fariburz had undertaken to pay in return for protection against further Turkic raids.

Bar Hebraeus records that in 1067 a Shirvanshah trapped an Armenian patrician named Aristakes with 200 of his men and handed them over to Alp Arslan, who ultimately forced them to convert to Islam. Although Bar Hebraeus does not name the Shirvanshah, and curiously describes him as a "Turkish emir", Fariburz was the ruler active in that year.

=== The rebellion in Shaki and its aftermath ===
In April 1067 Bagrat IV of Georgia marched against Fariburz and seized the castle of Daskarat al-Husayn in the province of Shaki, which he subsequently handed over to Aghsartan I, king of Kakheti, who now held the province that had formerly belonged to Fariburz. Fariburz marched to recover the fortress but failed and returned to the capital. Later in 1067 the military chiefs Qaymas and Qara-tegin came to the Shirvanshah with a detachment of Turkic cavalry, this time apparently invited by Fariburz against Georgians, and Qara-tegin was given in marriage a daughter of Fariburz's uncle Qubad. Qaymas died suddenly in Shirvan shortly afterwards – Ashurbeyli raises the possibility of poison – and was buried in Yazidiyya. In June the shah's cousin Lashkarsitan was killed before the gates of Qabala by the people of Quni (or Khuni) – possibly, in Ashurbeyli's conjecture, Khazars settled there. In October Fariburz's aunt Shamkuya died in the Gulustan castle and was buried beside her father at Shabaran.

=== Submission to Alp Arslan ===
Towards the end of 1067 the Seljuq sultan Alp Arslan entered South Caucasus since region's overlord Elbasan supported his rival Qawurd. Fariburz went to him with precious gifts, offering his presents and his service (al-hadiyya wa'l-khidma), and in 1068 accompanied him on campaign against Bagrat IV; the Shaddadid Fadl ibn Shavur likewise met the sultan in submission, handing over the keys of his treasury. Fariburz used the sultan's authority to settle his own scores: on his return he marched against Quni, killing many of its people, driving off the herds and burning the villages in revenge for Lashkarsitan.

When Alp Arslan came back from his Georgian campaign and passed through Ganja towards Barda, the people of Derbent complained to him that Fariburz had imprisoned several of their chiefs – part of his continuing struggle with the ra'ises who sought to rule the city independently. The sultan ordered their release, which Fariburz carried out; nonetheless, Alp Arslan had him imprisoned. In the ensuing confusion Qara-tegin – by marriage the husband of Fariburz's cousin – fled from Yazidiyya to Masqat, where he was killed, and Fariburz's brother Guzdaham ibn Sallar absconded to the country of the Lakz with the tribute money owed to the sultan. After some days Fariburz was freed and sent home, but only on condition of a heavy annual tribute. In July 1068 Afridun left Derbent and returned to Shirvan, meanwhile Alp Arslan left Caucasus following the news of Böritigin's death.

Fariburz subsequently learned that Guzdaham, still in possession of the tribute, had moved from Lakz to Derbent and taken refuge with the chiefs of the city. By November 1068 he had assembled an army and encamped on the Rubas River with the aim of taking al-Bab. Several engagements were fought at a place called Khurmastan beneath the city walls between the Shirvanian army and the Derbentis under Guzhdaham, with the men of Haydaq and Tawig fighting on the Derbenti side, and Fariburz's forces were worsted. The tide turned when Mufarrij ibn Muzaffar, the chief of the ra'ises, went over to the Shirvanshah and seized the citadel, while Guzhdaham held the town; after daily fighting between the two factions, Guzdaham fled to the Lakz and the emir Abd al-Malik ibn Lashkari to Haydaq, whereupon Mufarrij took possession of the whole city. Fariburz and Afridun then advanced to the frontier province and entered the citadel of al-Bab held by their ally; after four days the shah returned home, leaving Afridun as governor. Afridun set about restoring the fortress and ordered a moat dug before it.

=== Conflict with Shaddadids and Derbent ===
Georgians became active once again following Alp Arslan's leave. Fadl ibn Shavur, encamped at Isani (a suburb of Tbilisi on the left bank of the Mtkvari) and with 33,000 men ravaged the countryside. Being defeated by Bagrat, Fadl was taken prisoner by Kakhetian Aghsartan. At the price of conceding several fortresses on the Iori River, Bagrat ransomed Fadl and received from him the surrender of Tbilisi where he reinstated a local emir on the terms of vassalage in April 1069 thanks to Savtegin.

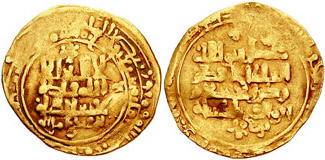
Coin minted during the reign of Malik-Shah I.

While Fadl ibn Shavur was a captive of the Georgians, Fariburz broke their peace and raided Arran. Once Fadl regained his liberty he raised an army, struck back at Shirvan and even had the khutbah read in his own name at Derbent. In the fighting that followed between the Shirvanshah and the Arranshah, supported by the people of al-Bab, Fariburz nevertheless secured the whole territory of Masqat with Mihyariya, the district around Derbent (in the area of the present-day Quba region). He fortified Mihyariya with walls, turning it into a town with a citadel at its centre, and made it his principal residence near the Caspian Sea – evidently a forward base and refuge for the struggle over Derbent – while supporting Afridun in the citadel of al-Bab with monthly rotations of troops. In October 1071, taking hostages from the Derbentis, who had been compelled – with the ra'is Mufarrij's help – to acknowledge the Shirvanshah, Fariburz concluded an agreement with them and sent Afridun to Derbent as its ruler; the khutbah in the city was read in the Shirvanshah's name.

The arrangement did not last. In November 1071 the Turk Yaghma arrived at al-Bab as governor appointed by sultan Alp Arslan and demanded the surrender of the citadel and of Masqat. In January 1072 Yaghma entered the fortress, and Fariburz and Afridun withdrew to Shirvan, taking their grain and provisions with them. In the same year Guzdaham died at Shaki; his body was brought to Yazidiyya and buried there. In April 1072 the ra'ises of al-Bab moved against Masqat, Fariburz's last refuge in the north, but the Shirvanshah maintained the struggle both against them and against his western neighbours around Shaki.

In June 1072 Fariburz made an alliance with Fadl ibn Shavur and invaded Shaki, domains of Aghsartan. The allies took and destroyed the castle of Malugh (near modern Şıxoba, Azerbaijan), which Aghsartan had earlier acquired, and put its "infidel" defenders – presumably Christians – to the sword; but Fariburz was unable to recover the province as a whole, and during Alp Arslan's campaign Aghsartan kept his lands by converting to Islam. On 15 December 1072 Alp Arslan died, and after a brief succession struggle his son Malik-Shah I took the throne.

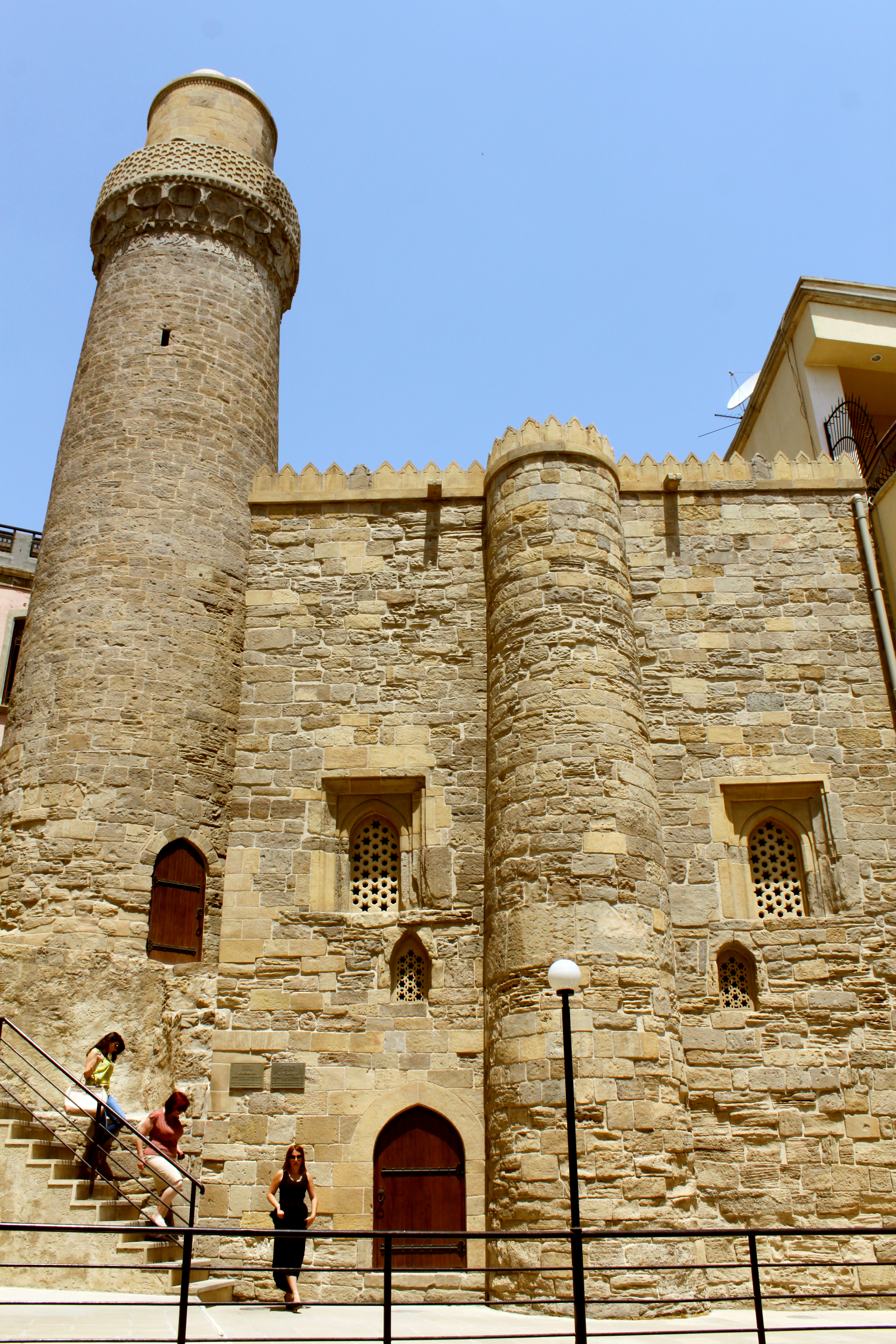
The Muhammad Mosque (Sınıq Qala) in the Old City of Baku, built in 1078/9 during the reign of Fariburz

In 1074 a band of Turkic warriors led by another warlord, Arghar ibn Buqa, entered Shirvan, Arghar declaring that the sultan had granted him the country as an iqta'. Fariburz lulled him with gifts and money until Arghar felt secure, then had him abruptly seized. Fear of Malik-Shah's reaction soon made the shah reconsider: he released Arghar with his own hands, offered an excuse and presented him with fresh gifts. Arghar feigned forgiveness, escaped from the court, raised an army and invaded Shirvan, ravaging the country until Malik-Shah compelled him to make good the damage, which he did in 1075. In these years Fariburz, by his accustomed diplomacy, obtained from the sultan the restoration of his former privileges, and completed the subjugation of the Lezgins in eastern and western Lakz.

The frontier province of al-Bab, however, was granted by the sultan as an iqta' to Savtegin, "emir of the two Iraqs", and after the arrival of Savtegin's representative Fariburz surrendered Derbent once again – mindful, too, of the fate of Fadl III, whose lands Savtegin had annexed outright. From this time the Shirvanshah was reduced to a vassal paying an annual tax (mal) into the sultan's treasury; the Ta'rikh al-Bab adds, in a passage Minorsky considered Münejjim Bashi's own addition, that "this situation continued until his death. After Fariburz the ruler of Shirvan was his son Afridun ibn Fariburz..."

The size of the tribute owed to Malik-Shah is given differently by the sources. According to al-Bundari, when Malik-Shah passed through Arran the Shirvanshah at first resisted, then undertook to pay 70,000 dinars a year into the treasury, a sum that was allowed to be reduced from time to time until it settled at 40,000 dinars; al-Husayni likewise gives 70,000 dinars, and Mükrimin Halil Yınanç dated the sultan's expedition to between 1076 and 1078/9. Nasawi states instead that the Shirvanshah, coming to court after ceaseless raids and battles that had destroyed the greater part of his army, was assessed at 100,000 dinars a year, and Münejjim Bashi confirms that he duly began to pay the annual tribute.

== Later reign, coinage and inscriptions ==
Fariburz retained real power in Shirvan even under Seljuq overlordship, and the shifting formulae of his coins track the changing degree of his dependence. The earliest type, represented in the Chukhuryurd hoard from the Shamakhi district and in the Moscow Historical Museum, names the caliph al-Qa'im and gives the shah's full sovereign titulature: al-Malik al-Adil Abu-Shuja Fariburz ibn Sallar, Shirvanshah; since al-Qa'im died in 1075 and Fariburz acceded in 1063, these coins belong to the first years of the reign, before his submission, and the royal style al-malik al-adil marks his full independence. A second type, of debased silver, names the caliph al-Muqtadi and the sultan Malik-Shah, and gives Fariburz's name with his patronymic but without any title at all – struck between 1075 and 1092, it is the numismatic record of his vassalage. A third type names the caliph al-Mustazhir (from 1094) and no sultan, and styles the ruler al-Malik Fariburz: evidently Fariburz exploited the wars between Malik-Shah's sons to withhold recognition of any Seljuq sultan and to resume the royal title.

Two inscriptions of the year 471 AH (1078/9) illuminate the same period. One, from the Shamakhi district, reads: "The just, great Shirvanshah Fariburz ordered the building of this majestic edifice. In the year four hundred and seventy-one." The other is on the Muhammad Mosque (Sınıq Qala) in the Old City of Baku – the oldest surviving mosque of the city – and states that it was built by al-ustad al-ra'is Muhammad ibn Abu Bakr; Fariburz is not named, which Ashurbeyli connects with the growing power of the ra'ises, who in the towns of Seljuq-era Shirvan strove for independence from feudal authority in municipal affairs.

== Death and succession ==
No source records Fariburz's death, and the end of his reign can be established only from coins and inscriptions. The third coin type shows him still reigning after al-Mustazhir's accession in 1094, and a coin of Manuchihr II shows the latter as Shirvanshah by 1105, placing Fariburz's death between 1094 and 1105; a building inscription reading "In the time of the Shirvanshah Abu'l-Muzaffar, helper of the faithful, Manuchihr ibn Fariburz. In the year four hundred and eighty-nine [1096]" narrows the end of his reign to no later than 1096. Minorsky accordingly placed his death c. 1096. Münejjim Bashi's statement that Fariburz was succeeded by his son Afridun is considered by Minorsky to be the compiler's own addition to the Ta'rikh al-Bab; in fact Manuchihr II and Afridun I ruled in turn.

A complication is presented by the writings of Masud ibn Namdar, whose panegyrics – the only ones in the collection addressed to any ruler – are directed to a Shirvanshah Fakhr al-Din Fariburz ibn Sallar. Ashurbeyli herself concludes from them that Fariburz was still alive, despite his advanced age, during the events at Baylaqan at the beginning of the war between the sultans Muhammad and Barkiyaruq, while Beilis, on the same evidence, dated Fariburz's activity to "c. 1067 – not earlier than 1111". How this testimony is to be reconciled with the epigraphic date of 1096 remains an open question.

Masud also mentions a son of Fariburz, the emir al-'Adud, who governed Ganja – a vassal possession of the Shirvanshah at the end of the 11th century – bore the titles of emir and great hajib rather than malik or shah, and had a vizier of his own; Masud served at his court. Ashurbeyli observes that al-'Adud is a laqab rather than a name; the person behind it cannot yet be identified with certainty, but she conjectures that it may be a title of Manuchihr II.

== Legacy ==
A qasida of Masud ibn Namdar credits Fariburz with taking the Mughan steppe as a "land of oath" – its nomadic population, or part of it, evidently entering the Shirvanshah's service – and, after a raid on the "Abkhaz" (the Georgians), with "hastily seizing" Arran and appointing an amil over Ganja; the sources also speak of Georgian raids and hostage-taking in return. Fariburz was likewise counted suzerain of Baylaqan, to which he sent his amils, though the city's self-government meant he did not hold it under full control. If Masud's testimony is accurate, Fariburz for a time united all of eastern Transcaucasia under his authority. Continuing the traditional Mazyadid policy of strengthening Shirvan's influence in southern Dagestan, he strove to subjugate the Ghumiq and to bring them to accept Islam, making use of the Lakz, Shirvan's old allies and vassals; he was also allied with the tribe of Sulvar – possibly, in Ashurbeyli's conjecture, the Turkic Suvars (Sabirs), said to number 100,000, who had settled in southern Dagestan in the mid-11th century and raided the lands of the Alans.

The medieval Persian poet Khaqani invokes Fariburz in a panegyric addressed to Ismat al-Din, sister of the Shirvanshah Manuchihr III: "Your ancestor Shah Fariburz went to visit Malik-Shah and reached Isfahan. None of the Kayanids had gone to the Kaaba. You visited the Kaaba and became the pride of the Kayanids" – commemorating Fariburz's journey to the sultan's court, and implying that no member of the house before Ismat al-Din had made the pilgrimage to Mecca.

The government of Fakhr al-Din Fariburz was known as the Majlis-i al-Fakhri. His vizier was Baha al-Din Muhammad b. Hussayn al-Kakuyi, a member of the famous Daylamite ruling house whose family claimed descent from the military commander Makan ibn Kaki and held the vizierate of Shirvan hereditarily for more than three generations; the Shirvanshah and his vizier were patrons of the adibs – men of letters and officials – and it was in the service of this family that Masud ibn Namdar worked at Baylaqan. Beilis suggests that the Kakuyids were kinsmen of the Shirvanshahs by marriage – the nisba may derive from the Daylami kaku, "maternal uncle" – and notes that the name Fariburz (Faramurz) was itself current among the Kakuyids, which may explain the change in the naming tradition of the dynasty observed by Minorsky. Ashurbeyli sums him up as a ruler of thirty-three years who, amid grave external upheavals and internal unrest, successfully overcame every obstacle to the seizure of neighbouring territories and the expansion and consolidation of his state, so that the Seljuq conquerors, though they subjected the country to their rule, could not put an end to the Shirvanshah's power.

== Sources ==
- Ashurbeyli, Sara (2006). Şirvanşahlar dövləti [The State of the Shirvanshahs] (in Azerbaijani). Baku: Avrasiya Press.
- Bosworth, C. E. (1968). "The Political and Dynastic History of the Iranian World (A.D. 1000–1217)". In Frye, R. N. (ed.). The Cambridge History of Iran, Volume 5: The Saljuq and Mongol periods. Cambridge: Cambridge University Press. pp. 1–202. ISBN 0-521-06936-X.
- Hasan, Hadi (1929). Falaki-i-Shirwani: His Times, Life, and Works. University of London.
- Minorsky, Vladimir (1958). A History of Sharvān and Darband in the 10th-11th Centuries. Cambridge: W. Heffer and Sons. OCLC 5042566.
- Turan, Osman (2009). Selçuklular Tarihi ve Türk İslam Medeniyeti [History of Seljuks and Turkish Islamic Civilization] (in Turkish). İstanbul: Ötüken Neşriyat. ISBN 978-975-437-470-4.

Fariburz I House of Shirvanshah Born: ? Died: c. 1096
Regnal titles
Preceded by Sallar	Shirvanshah; 1063 – c. 1096	Succeeded by Manuchihr II
