= Afridun I =

Shah of Shirvan 1106 to 1120

Shah of Shirvan
- Reign: 1106–1120
- Predecessor: Manuchihr II
- Successor: ManuchIhr III

Emir of Derbent
- Tenure: 30 January 1066 - July 1068; 28 December 1068 - January 1072
- Predecessor: Abd al-Malik III
- Successor: Emir Yaghma
- Born: 1046
- Died: November 1120 (aged 73–74); Derbent
- Issue: ManuchIhr IiI
- House: Kasranid
- Father: Fariburz I
- Mother: Sarir princess
- Religion: Sunni Islam

Afridun the Martyr was the eighteenth Shah of Shirvan. He was appointed governor of Derbent several times during his father Fariburz I's reign. "Afridun" is the arabicized form of the New Persian name Fereydun, an Iranian mythical hero.

== Life ==
=== Under Fariburz I ===
He was born c. 1046 to Fariburz I and his wife, a Sarir princess. After having suffered from several raids from the Shaddadid ruler Abu'l-Asvar Shavur I, Afridun was sent by his father Fariburz I to ask for help from the ruler of Sarir, whom Afridun was related to through his mother. However, the ruler of Sarir declined his request, and after three months, Afridun returned to Shirvan. On 30 January 1066, Fariburz appointed Afridun as the governor of Derbent, who was warmly received by its people. In July 1068, Afridun left Derbent and returned to Shirvan.

=== Reign ===
He succeeded his elder brother Manuchihr II around 1106. He wed his son Manuchihr to David IV's eldest daughter Tamar in c. 1111. Despite this alliance, Afridun probably continued to cooperate with Seljuks. David sent his son Demetrius on a punitive campaign to Shirvan in 1117. Demetre returned to Georgia after conquering the castle of Kaladzor (later Alberd, now Ağdaş).

=== Death ===
It is said that he was killed in a battle against "infidels" near Derbent in November 1120, possibly while attempting to prevent David IV's invasion from Georgia, thus gaining the nickname "the Martyr". He has been succeed by his only son Manuchihr III.

== Legacy ==
His name is inscribed on Pir Huseyn Khanqah located near river Pirsaat: "This building was ordered to be built by Abu'l Muzaffar Fariburz ibn Gershab, ibn Farrukhzad, ibn Manuchehr's ancestor Jam Afridun" He is remembered by Khaqani in his ode to Ismataddin: "I saw jewels of Dara in the mines of Afridun the Martyr". No coins related to Afridun has been found so far.

== Sources ==
- Bosworth, C. E. (1968). "The Political and Dynastic History of the Iranian World (A.D. 1000–1217)". In Frye, R. N. (ed.). The Cambridge History of Iran, Volume 5: The Saljuq and Mongol periods. Cambridge: Cambridge University Press. pp. 1–202. ISBN 0-521-06936-X.
- Minorsky, Vladimir (1958). A History of Sharvān and Darband in the 10th-11th Centuries. Cambridge: W. Heffer and Sons. OCLC 5042566.
- Tafazzoli, Ahmad (1999). "Ferēdūn". In Yarshater, Ehsan (ed.). Encyclopædia Iranica. Vol. IX/5: Fauna III–Festivals VIII. London and New York: Routledge & Kegan Paul. pp. 531–533. ISBN 978-0-933273-33-7.

Afridun I House of Shirvanshah Born: ? Died: 1120
Regnal titles
Preceded by Fariburz I	Shirvanshah; 1106–1120	Succeeded by Manuchehr III
