= Tabasaran =

Tabasaran or Tabassaran may refer to:

- Tabasaran language, Caucasus
- Tabasaran people, Caucasus
- Tabasaran district, Dagestan
- Tabasaran Principality, a state in Dagestan that existed from 1642 until the 19th century
