= Gulustan Fortress (Shamakhi) =

- Azerbaijani: Gülüstan qalası
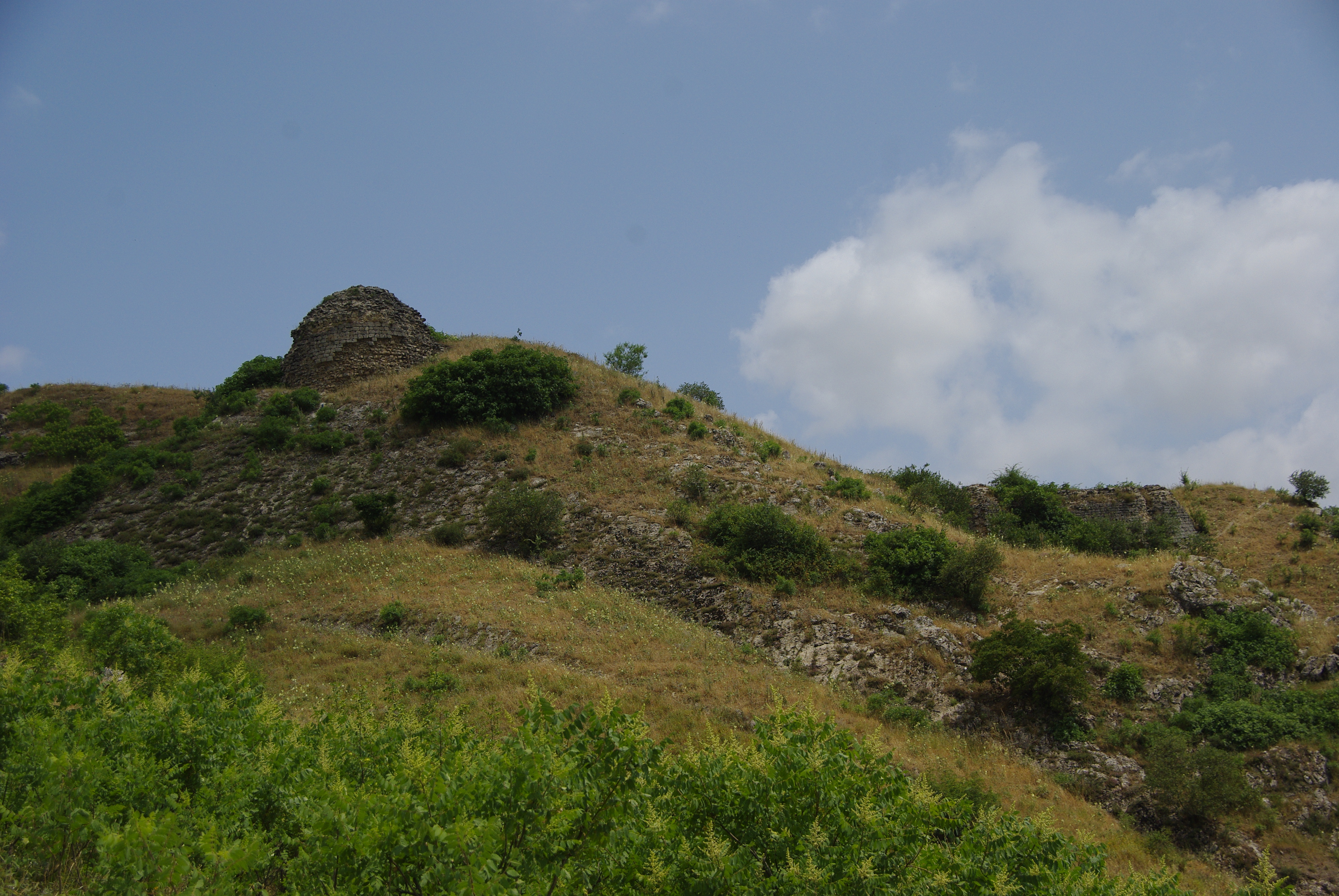

- Location within Azerbaijan

General information
- Status: Ruined
- Architectural style: Architectural school of Shirvan-Absheron
- Location: Böyük Xınıslı, Shamakhi, Azerbaijan
- Coordinates: 40.659816°N 48.616236°E
- Completed: 9th century
- Destroyed: 1547

Technical details
- Material: Limestone

Gulustan Fortress or Castle (Azerbaijani: Gülüstan qalası) is a medieval castle dating back to the 9th-12th centuries located in Shamakhi District of Azerbaijan. Although the oldest archeological findings from the castle date back to the 9th century, the Gulustan castle was radically rebuilt and strengthened in the 12th century - the beginning of the 13th century.

== Description ==
The fortress rises 190-200 m above the surrounding territory. The defensive walls of the fortress were built on the slopes of the mountain, and the citadel itself was built on the top. From the north, east and west, the fortress was surrounded by an abyss. Today, fragments of ruins of round and quadrangular walls and towers have been preserved here.

As a result of archaeological excavations on the territory of the fortress, the remains of buildings of the palace complex, samples of material culture of the 9th-12th centuries were discovered. Water entered the Gulistan fortress using clay pipes. The fortress also had an underground passage. Unlike other fortresses located on the territory of Azerbaijan (Galeyi Beygurt, Gulustan Fortress, etc.), the underground passage of the Gulistan fortress leading to the water is more complex and more carefully constructed.

== History ==
The fortress was presumably built in the 9th century. The orientalist and archaeologist Yevgeni Pakhomov assumed that in the area of the ruins of this fortress the city of Yazidiyya was located, the name of which as the capital of Shirvan is mentioned in “Tarikh al-Bab” until 1072. From 11th to 16th centuries it was the residence and defensive fortress of Shirvanshahs. The role of the fortress increGuliyevd in the 12th-early 13th century. It served both as a refuge and as the second residence of the Shirvanshahs after Shamakhi.

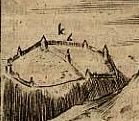
Gulistan fortress in an engraving from the “Description of a Journey” Adam Olearius 1656

The fortress was mentioned by Khaqani, Arif Ardabili and others. The Azerbaijani archaeologist Huseyn Jiddi believed that Khagani called the fortress a “new Kaaba-shed” in connection with the reconstruction of the fortress. This information is also confirmed by information from written sources, according to which in the 12th century, the sister of the Shirvanshah Manuchehr III - Shahbanu carried out repair work in the fortress.

Information about the fortress, its walls and general appearance is available in the work of the tutor of the son of Shirvanshah Kavus Arif Ardabili in his “Farhad-name”, which was written in the style of the poem “Khosrov and Shirin” by Nizami Ganjavi.

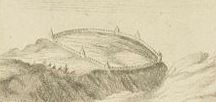
Fortress in a drawing of Shamakhi in the 18th century, published by Pieter van der Aa

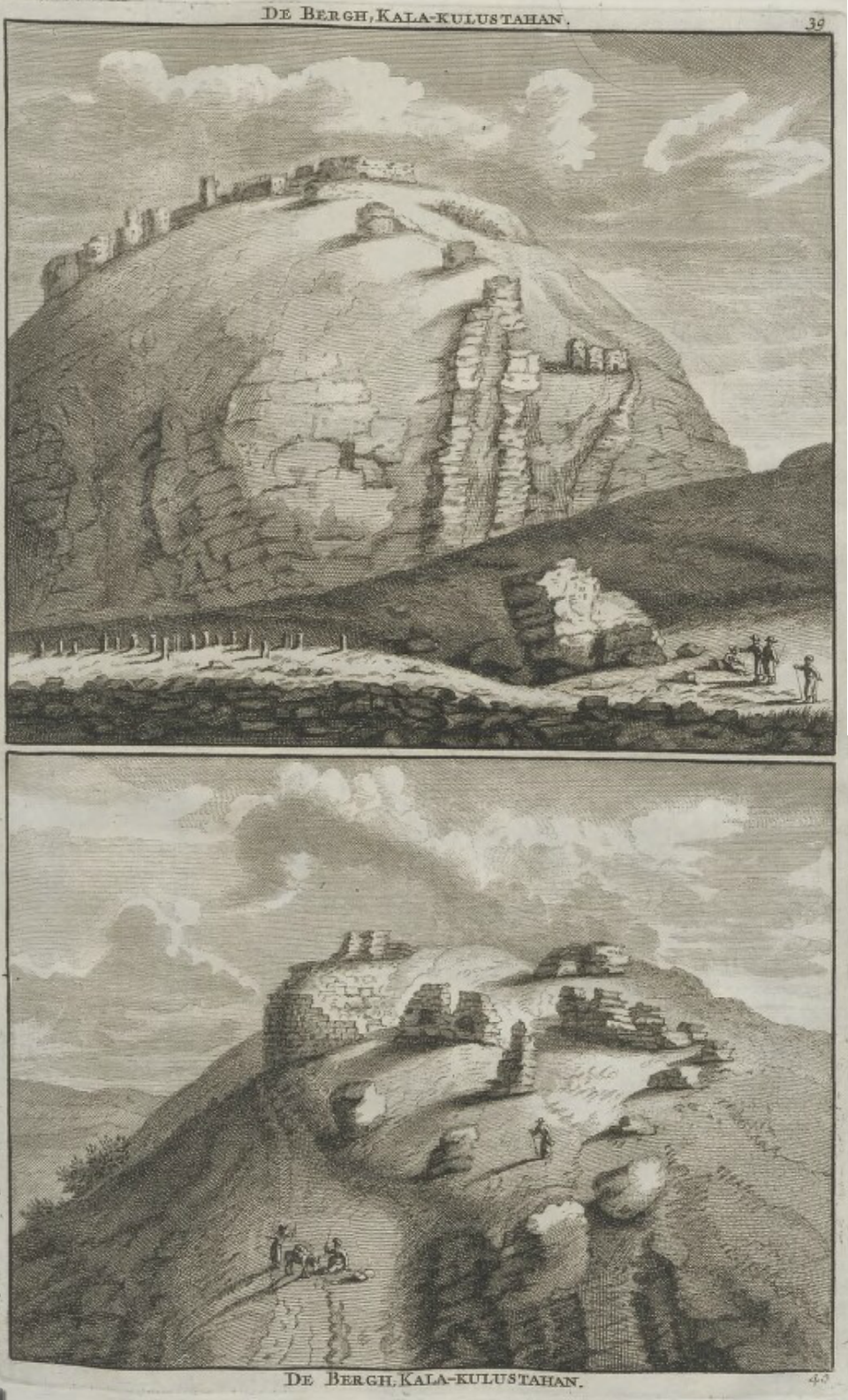
Gulustan Castle ruins by Cornelis de Bruijn, 1714

After the ruler of the Safavids Shah Ismail took Baku in 1501, his troops besieged the Gulustan fortress, but they failed to take it. The attempt to take the fortresses Kale-i Bugurt and Surkhab was also unsuccessful. Thus, due to stubborn resistance, Ismail was forced to lift the siege of Gulistan. In the spring of 1538, the 20000-strong Safavid army again marched to Shirvan. The country was devastated. The Qizilbash besieged the Gulustan fortress and after a long siege took it. The Emirs of Shirvan were executed, and the last Shirvanshah Shakhrukh was taken to Tabriz, where he was killed.

Tahmasp I's brother, Alqas Mirza raised a rebellion in 1547 which was suppressed, and Alqas himself fled. However, his followers led by Mehtar Dawlat Yar continued to resist in the fortress. Negotiations failed when Shah's envoy was executed by the defenders of the citadel. Sadavid army laid siege to fortress for 3 months. According to Hasan-beg Rumlu the fortress was breached with the help of women embittered at Dawlat Yar, who threw tent ropes to qurchis of Shamlu, who managed to use them climb the fortress walls. Fortress was destroyed on the orders of Shah.

With the advent and spread of firearms, the Gulistan fortress eventually lost its defensive significance.

== Sources ==
- Ashurbeyli, Sara (1983). Государство Ширваншахов (VI-XVI вв.) [The State of the Shirvanshahs (6th–16th centuries)] (in Russian). Baku: Elm.
- Jiddi, Huseyn; Mamedzade, K.M.; Ibrahimov, F.A. (1972). "Средневековый город Шемаха" [The medieval city of Shamakhi]. Археологические открытия 1971 года [Archaeological Discoveries of 1971] (in Russian). Moscow: Nauka.
- Jiddi, Huseyn (1981). "Средневековый город Шемаха" [The medieval city of Shamakhi]. Археологические открытия 1971 года [Archaeological Discoveries of 1971] (in Russian). Baku: Elm.
- Guliyev, Jamil, ed. (1982). "Ҝүлүстан галасы" [Gulustan Fortress]. Azerbaijani Soviet Encyclopedia (in Azerbaijani). Vol. 6. Baku. pp. 118–119.
