= Masud ibn Namdar =

Masud ibn Namdar (Kurdish: Mesûd îbn Namdar) was a Kurdish collector of local documents who wrote some forty years after the fall of Shaddadids of Ganja. He was the author of collection of documents relating to the area of Arran. His records, compiled about 1111, discuss the revolt of Askuya against his father Fadl as well as other current events. Also from the correspondence collected by him, it seems that Ganja was temporarily occupied by the Shirvanshah Fariburz. Overall, his records provide important information on the history of the Caucasus and are used by historians to sketch the events of his time.

== See also ==
- List of Kurdish scholars
- List of Kurdish writers
