= Abu Hamid al-Gharnati =

Abū Ḥāmid al-Gharnāṭī (Arabic: أبو حامد الغرناطي; full name: Abū Ḥāmid Muḥammad ibn ʿAbd al-Raḥmān ibn Sulaymān ibn Rabīʿ al-Māzinī al-Qaysī; c. 1080 – 1170) was an Arab traveler, geographer, and writer from Granada, Al-Andalus. who travelled around eastern and central Europe, and wrote about his travels in an Arabic travelogue, Tuhfat al-Albab ("Gift of Hearts"). He also wrote about spectacular places and things in al-Mu’rib ‘an ba’d ‘aja’ib al-Maghreb (Praise of Some of the Wonders of North Africa), works that combine geographical description, ethnographic observation, and accounts of marvels. He established a genre of books of wonder in Arabic. Many of the things he saw and wrote about were embellished with fantastic details.

== Biography ==
Born in Granada in 1080, his nisbas al-Māzinī and al-Qaysī connect him with Arab tribal lineages associated with the wider Qays confederation. Al-Gharnati's family is thought to have fled Granada to escape the reign of the Almoravid emir Yusuf ibn Tashfin. He travelled from Iberia to Egypt and Syria in 1106, reaching Alexandria in 1115 via Sardinia and Sicily, writing about Mount Etna. He moved to Baghdad in 1123 it was there that his first son, Hamid, was born, from whom he received the honorific name (kunya) Abu Hamid ("father of Hamid"). In 1130 he visited the cities of Abhar and Ardabil in Southern Azerbaijan (now Iran), as well as Derbent in Dagestan. The following year, al-Gharnati lived for a time in the city of Saqsin, located on the lower Volga. In Derbent (or in one of the villages near Derbent), he was received by the emir, to whom he taught lessons in Islamic law. In Saqsin, local jurisprudence (fiqh) experts would gather around him, coming with questions regarding the resolution of complex legal cases.

He lived with the Volga Bulgarians from 1131 until 1150, where he set out from Bulgar to the Rus', traveling along the "Slavic River," and mentions the use of fur money in Rus':

"And I arrived in the city of the [country of] Slavs, which is called "Kuyav" (Kyiv). And in it are thousands of "Maghrebis," who look like Turks, speak a Turkic language, and shoot arrows like Turks. And they are known in this country by the name of Bedzn[ak] (Pechenegs). And I met a man from the Baghdadites whose name is Karim ibn Fayruz al-Jawhari, he was married to the [daughter] of one of these Muslims. I organized the Friday prayer for these Muslims and taught them the khutbah, as they did not know the Friday prayer."

He then travelled to Hungary, where he worked as an advisor in the court of King Géza II. While there, he further interacted with the local nomadic turkic groups such as the Pecheneg Muslims who had formed an important military force in the hands of King Géza II. During his time in Hungary, later described in his Kitaab al-Mu’rib ‘an baad aja’ib al-Maghrib (Praise of Some of the Wonders of the West) he purchased two young slave girls (jawārī): a fifteen-year-old girl skilled in domestic tasks for 10 dinars, and an eight-year-old Byzantine girl for half the price who was captured during the Hungarian wars against the Greeks, which he noted had caused slave prices to drop. One of these girls, bore him a son who died in infancy, though upon his departure he left an older son behind in Hungary, who had two wives and was well-established in the local Muslim community.

He moved through Kiev to Baghdad in 1154 and lived in Mosul from 1161, Aleppo from 1165, and finally Damascus from 1169 until his death. He wrote about places such as Mount Etna during journeys through Sicily and the central Mediterranean.
