= Lezgistan =

Irredentist concept

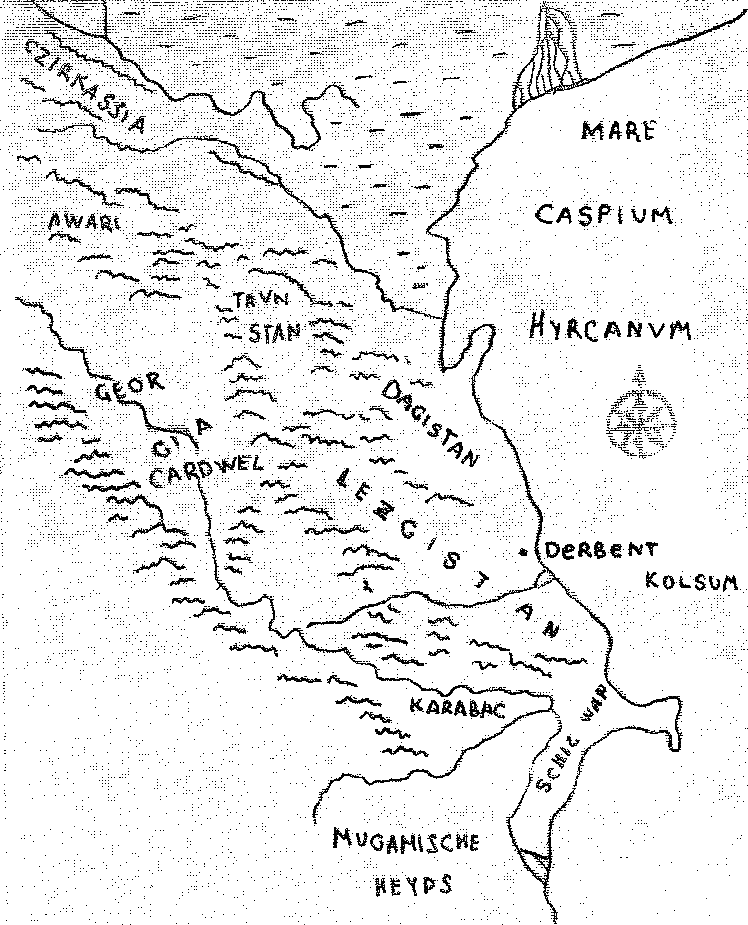
Lezgistan from map of the Caucasus by Johann Gustav Gaerber (1728)

Lezgistan, sometimes referred to as Lekia, is the ethnic homeland of the Lezgins, as well as the area of distribution of the Lezgin language.

== Historical toponym ==
While ancient Greek historians, including Herodotus, Strabo, and Pliny the Elder, referred to Legoi people who inhabited Caucasian Albania, Arab historians of 9-10th centuries mention the kingdom of Lakz in present-day southern Dagestan. Al Masoudi referred to inhabitants of this area as Lakzams (Lezgins), who defended Shirvan against invaders from the north.

Prior to the Russian Revolution, "Lezgin" was a term applied to all ethnic groups inhabiting the present-day Russian Republic of Dagestan.

The first notion of an autonomous Lezgin territory, that is, "Lezgistan", was voiced in 1936 during Joseph Stalin's reign.

== Independence projects ==
Flag used by Lezgins

After the dissolution of USSR there was an irredentist project to create a unified Lezgistan on Lezgin-inhabited areas of Azerbaijan and Russian Republic of Dagestan. In December 1991, various Lezgin groups held the All-National Congress of Lezgins. During it, they adopted a declaration calling for the creation of an independent Lezgistan, which would be a national entity uniting the Lezgins of Dagestan and Azerbaijan. Sadval movement and Federal Lezgian National and Cultural Autonomy, Samur are the main political organisations seeking separatism.

== See also ==
- Lezgins
- Lezgin language
- Lezgins in Azerbaijan
- Caucasian Albania

== Sources ==
- Haspelmath, Martin (1993). A Grammar of Lezgian. De Gruyter. ISBN 9783110137354.
