= Savtegin =

11th-century officer and Amir al-hajj

Savtegin Imad ad-Dawlah Sarhang Saw Takin

Amir al-Hajj
- In office 1083 – 1084

Personal details
- Born: unknown date Khakestar
- Died: 1084 Isfahan, Seljuk Sultanate
- Cause of death: Tuberculosis
- Awards: Honored by dressing in a Hil'at by Caliph al-Muqtadi

Military service
- Allegiance: Seljuks
- Years of service: 1084 (end of active service)
- Rank: Commander

Savtegin (d. 1084) was a prominent emir of the early Seljuk Empire, during the reigns of Tughril I, Alp Arslan, and Malik-Shah I. His full name in Arabic, as given by Münejjim Bāshī Ahmad Effendi, was 'Imād ad-Dawlah Sarhang Sāw Takīn. He first appears in sources during the reign of Tughril I, when he was sent as an ambassador when rumors arose that Ibrahim Yinal would rebel. He later took part in the campaign against Arslan Besasîrî, a Turkic commander under the Buyids who had captured the Abbasid caliph al-Qa'im. Arslan Besasîrî was killed in battle on 18 January 1060. Later, in April–May 1061, Savtegin was part of the delegation sent to Baghdad to negotiate a marriage between Tughril and al-Qa'im's daughter Sayyida (Arslan Khatun, daughter of Tughril's brother Chaghri Beg, and the vizier Amid al-Mulk Kondori were also part of this delegation).

After Tughril's death in 1063, the vizier Amid al-Mulk installed Chaghri Beg's son Sulayman on the throne, but Alp Arslan and Qutalmish each also claimed the throne. Savtegin backed Alp Arslan, who defeated Kutalmish and became sole ruler in January 1064. After this point, Savtegin is given the title "emir" in sources and is described as one of the leading men in the Seljuk state. Later, Savtegin was part of a delegation sent to meet with the Byzantine emperor Romanos IV Diogenes in the lead-up to the Battle of Manzikert in 1071. Savtegin also participated in the battle at Manzikert.

After Alp Arslan's death in 1072, his son Malik-Shah succeeded him but was contested by his uncle Qavurt. Savtegin was the leading commander on Malik-Shah's side, which ended up victorious. Savtegin later participated in campaigns under Malik-Shah against the Karakhanids, in Ganja and Arran, and in Georgia. Malik-Shah appointed him (or someone else with the same name) governor of Termez when he captured the city in 1073. Malik-Shah later appointed Savtegin amir al-hajj in 476 AH (1083-84 CE). He was received by the Abbasid caliph al-Muqtadi in Baghdad on 17 April 1084, who honored him by dressing him in a hil'at.

Not long after, though, Savtegin came down with tuberculosis. He hurried back to Isfahan, where he died on a Friday in September or October 1084. He left behind a massive fortune: two million dinars, 15,000 items of clothing (including 9,000 made of Greek silk), 5,000 horses, 1,000 camels, and 30,000 sheep. This is not including land, weapons, or other possessions. At some point, Savtegin also founded a ribat in Hakister, where he was born.
