= Shabaran =

Former settlement in Azerbaijan

- Location of Shabaran in Azerbaijan
- 41°17′44″N 48°52′53″E
- Type: Settlement
- Region: Shirvan

Site notes
- Condition: Ruined

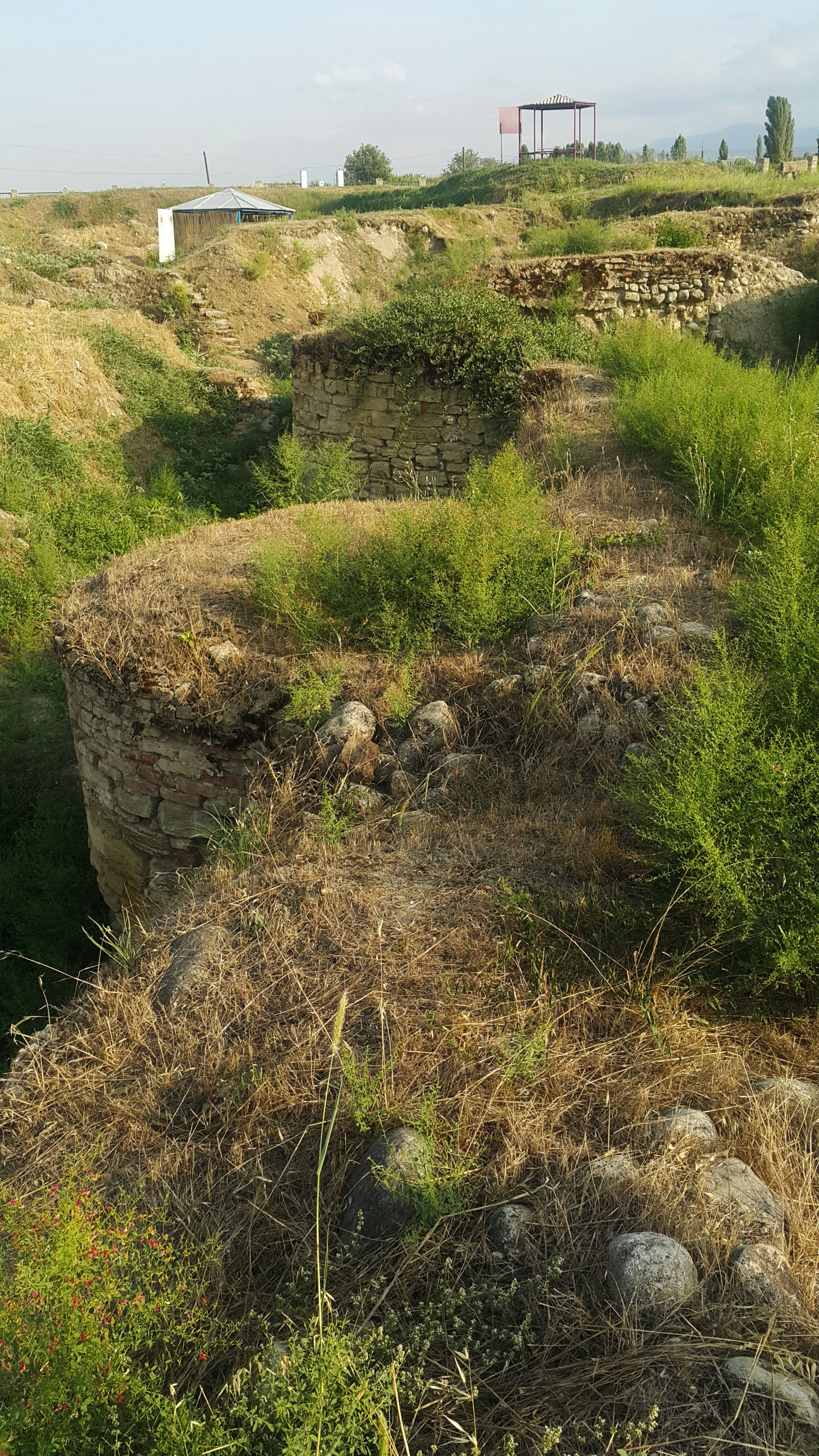
Remains of ancient Shabran city, Azerbaijan

Shabaran (also spelled Shaburan and Shaberan; Persian: شاوران), was a town and district in the historical region of Shirvan, in what is now the eastern part of Azerbaijan.

Shabaran was founded by the Sasanian king Shapur II (r. 309–379). The 10th-century Persian geography Hudud al-'Alam refers to it as Shav.ran, whilst The Georgian Chronicles calls it Shaburan, which points to a possible relation to Shavur (Shapur?), an Iranian name that is attested in the Caucasus. Shabaran was the earliest capital of the Shirvan kingdom.

It was often contested between the Shirvanshahs, the Hashimids of Darband, and the rulers of Arran. According to the 10th-century Arab geographer al-Maqdisi, the majority of Shabaran's population was Christian. In 983, the Shirvanshah Muhammad IV (r. 981–991) had a wall constructed around Shabaran. The sudden emergence of Iranian names among the descendants of Shirvanshah Yazid ibn Ahmad (r. 991–1027) is significant in relation to the fact that he and his daughter Shamkuya were buried in Shabaran. This development most likely resulted from Yazid ibn Ahmad's union with a princess of an ancient local dynasty.

In 1167, Akhsitan I of Shirvan asked the King of Georgia George III for help to defend against Kipchak, Khazar, Alan and Rus' assaulters. George III marched against them and conquered Shabaran, which in Georgian sources is referred to as "Shaburani". George III proceeded to give this town to Shirvanshah, who was his subject.

In 1538 Shirvanshah rule was abolished by the Safavid shahs (kings) of Iran, who turned Shirvan into a province, which Shabaran was part of. The German explorer Engelbert Kaempfer (died 1716) mentions Shabaran as one of the villages in Iran that had coffeehouses.

Shabaran was completely destroyed in 1723.

== Sources ==
- Bosworth, C. E. (2011). "Šervānšāhs". Encyclopaedia Iranica.
- Floor, Willem M. (2008). Titles and Emoluments in Safavid Iran: A Third Manual of Safavid Administration, by Mirza Naqi Nasiri. Mage Publishers. ISBN 978-1933823232.
- Gould, Rebecca Ruth (2016). "Wearing the Belt of Oppression: Khāqāni's Christian Qasida and the Prison Poetry of Medieval Shirvān". Journal of Persianate Studies. 9 (1): 19–44. doi:10.1163/18747167-12341296.
- Le Strange, Guy (1905). The Lands of the Eastern Caliphate: Mesopotamia, Persia, and Central Asia, from the Moslem Conquest to the Time of Timur. Cambridge: Cambridge University Press.
- Lornejad, Siavash; Doostzadeh, Ali (2012). Arakelova, Victoria; Asatrian, Garnik (eds.). On the modern politicization of the Persian poet Nezami Ganjavi (PDF). Caucasian Centre for Iranian Studies. Archived from the original (PDF) on 2022-09-14.
- Matthee, Rudolph P. (2005). The pursuit of pleasure: drugs and stimulants in Iranian history, 1500-1900. Princeton University Press. ISBN 978-0691144443.
- Minorsky, Vladimir (1937). Ḥudūd al-ʿĀlam, The Regions of the World: A Persian Geography. Oxford University Press. ISBN 978-0906094037.
- Minorsky, Vladimir (1958). A History of Sharvān and Darband in the 10th-11th Centuries. Cambridge: W. Heffer & Sons, Ltd.
