= Munejjim-bashi Ahmed Dede =

Ottoman astronomer, astrologer, and historian

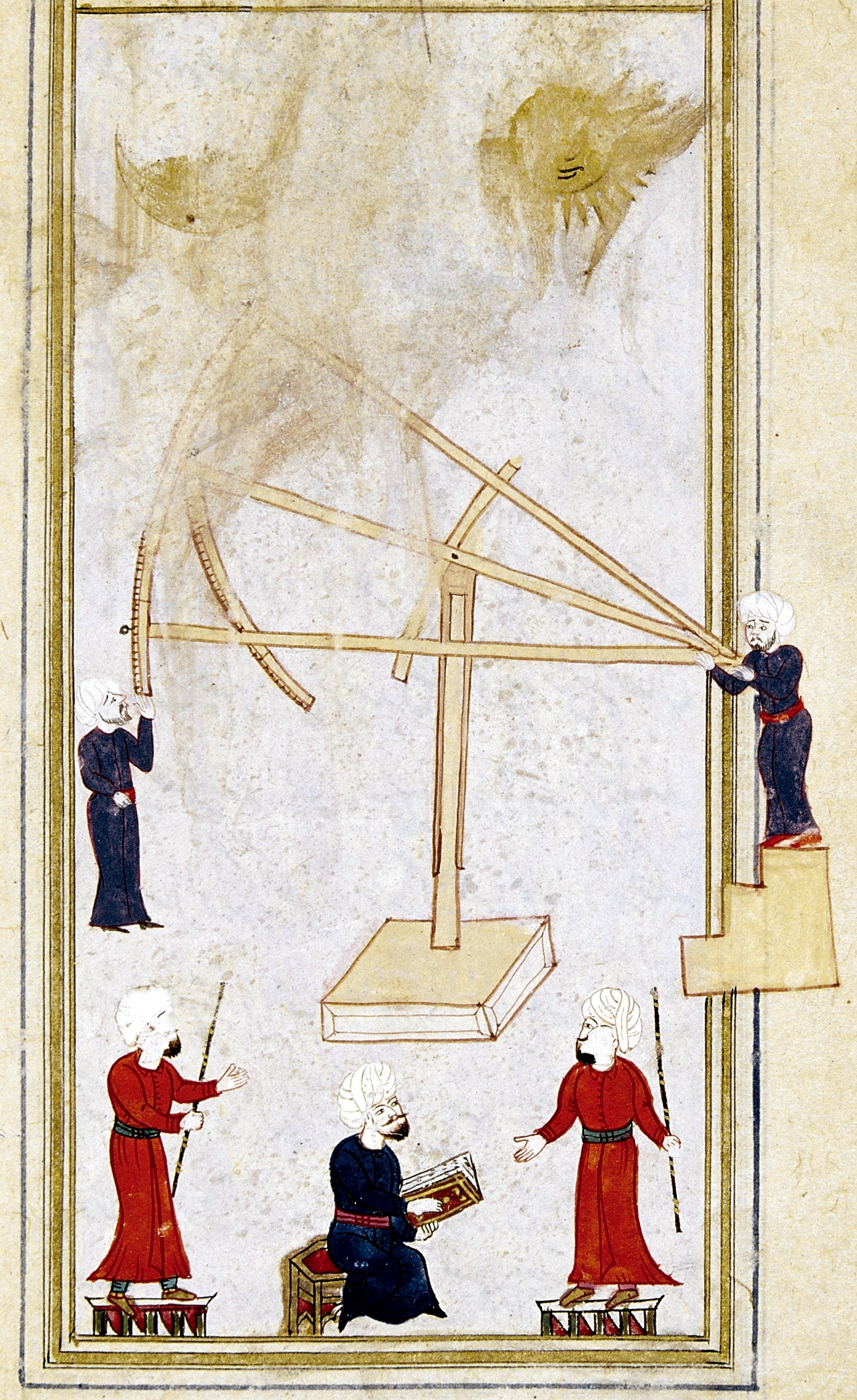
- Ottoman observatory astronomers and astrologers headed by the müneccimbaşı (chief astrologer) using the sextant.
- Born: 1631; Salonica, Rumelia Eyalet, Ottoman Empire (modern-day Greece)
- Died: February 27, 1702 (aged 70–71); Mecca, Ottoman Empire (modern-day Saudi Arabia)
- Occupations: Astrologer, Writer, Historian, Sufi Poet
- Notable work: Jamiʿ al-Duwal, Sahaif-ül-Ahbar, Dīvān

Ahmed Lütfullah (early 17th century – 27 February 1702), better known by his court title of Münejjim Bashi (Turkish: Müneccimbaşı; "Chief Astrologer"), was an Ottoman courtier, scholar, Sufi poet and historian. His chief work is the Jamiʿ al-Duwal, a world history particularly valuable for the history of the medieval Muslim dynasties of the regions around the southwestern shore of the Caspian Sea (Adharbayjan, Shirvan, Arran, Derbent). In Turkish literature, he is referred to also as Ahmed Lütfullah.

== Biography ==
His father Lütfullah was a native of Ereğli, Konya, but Ahmed was born in Salonica sometime in the first half of the 17th century (in 1631 according to the Encyclopædia Britannica). He was educated at the Mevlevi dervish lodge in the quarter of Kasımpaşa, spending 15 years there under the supervision of Sheikh Halil Dede. After studies on astronomy and astrology, he advanced to the position of chief court astrologer (müneccimbaşi) in 1667/8. He enjoyed his greatest prominence under Sultan Mehmed IV (reigned 1648–87), who in 1675/6 raised him to the rank of musahib-i padishahi ("imperial companion"), signifying his admittance to the innermost circle of the court. He retained the post until Mehmed IV's deposition in November 1687, when he was exiled to Egypt, where his adopted son Moralı Hasan Pasha served as governor. After some time he moved to Mecca, where he became the sheikh of the local Mevlevi lodge. In 1693/4 he moved to Medina for seven years. In 1700, he was recalled to Istanbul to work again as chief astrologer, but declined the offer because of his old age. He returned to Mecca, where he died on 27 February 1702. His tomb was located near the mausoleum of Khadija, the first wife of Muhammad.

== Works ==
=== The Compendium of Nations ===
Münejjim Bashi's main work is the Jamiʿ al-Duwal ("The Compendium of Nations"), written in Arabic. It was begun at the behest of Grand Vizier Kara Mustafa, who instructed him to prepare a comprehensive historical work. It is a world history, beginning with Adam and ending in Ottoman times, in the year 1678. It is divided into three parts: the history of Muhammad, the history of pre- and non-Islamic dynasties, and the history of Islamic dynasties, concluding with the history of the Ottoman dynasty until 1678. His work is especially valuable as it preserves information from several sources now lost, especially on many minor Muslim dynasties overlooked by major historians. This is particularly the case on his use of the lost Taʾrikh Bab al-Abwab ("History of Derbent"), which provides much information on the dynasties of eastern Transcaucasia, Arran and Adharbayjan. His pre-Islamic section is also notable, as he used Roman and Jewish sources, as well as West European chronicles, and was the first Islamic historian to deal with dynasties like the Babylonians, the Seleucids and the Assyrians. His work also includes sections on India and China. Although several manuscript copies of the original Arabic work are known to exist, the Jamiʿ al-Duwal was for long best known and accessible through a Turkish translation by Ahmed Nedim in the 18th century, known as Saha'if al-Akhbar ("The Pages of the Chronicle"). Although epitomized, Nedim's version "is very readable and not composed in the highflown literary style that prevailed in his period". The work notably provided the main material for Vladimir Minorsky's magisterial Studies in Caucasian history (London 1953) and A history of Sharvan and Darband (Cambridge 1958). The original manuscript, considered lost for a long time, is kept partly at the Library of the Selimiye Mosque in Edirne and the rest at the Library of the Topkapi Sarayi Museum in Istanbul.

In his history, Münejjim Bashi follows the method used in Islamic historiography by Ibn Khaldun, indicating his sources and submitting them to a critical investigation.

=== Other works ===
Although best known for his history, Münejjim Bashi also wrote numerous other works, such as a collection of poems (diwan) on mystical themes under the pen-name "Ashik" ("lover"), a Lata'if-name, treatises on geometry, music and mysticism, theological commentaries, and a translation of anecdotes of the bawdy bard and often homoerotic Persian satyrist Ubayd Zakani.

An important work is Hasia, a commentary of the interpretation of the Qur'an Tafsir al-baydawi al-musamma anwar altanzil wa asrar by Al Baidawi.

Of the other works written by Müneccimbaşi the following are worth mentioning:

- Şerh-i kitâb-ı Ahlâk – annotations on the ethics book of Qadi Adudun.
- Talikat 'ala Uklidi – a treatise of geometry.
- Vesilet ül-Vüsûl ilâ Ma'rifet İl-Hamli vel-Mahmûl – the science of logic.
- Risale-i Mûsikiyye – a treatise on music.
- Feyz-ül-Harem – a treatise on ādāb al-Muṭālaʿa, i.e. the etiquette of reading and studying books.
- Cayet-ül-Beyân fi Dekaik-i ilm-ül-Beyân – a study on the use of the metaphor.

== Sources ==
- Hasan, S. A. (December 1963). "Münejjim Bas̱ẖī: Turkish Historian of the Saljūqids of Īrān". Islamic Studies. 2 (4). Islamic Research Institute, International Islamic University, Islamabad: 457–466. ISSN 0578-8072. JSTOR 20832713.
- Kramers, J.H. (1993). "Müned̲j̲d̲j̲im Bas̲h̲i̊". The Encyclopedia of Islam, New Edition, Volume VII: Mif–Naz. Leiden and New York: BRILL. pp. 572–573. ISBN 90-04-09419-9.
