= Vladimir Minorsky =

Russian academic, historian, and orientalist (1877–1966)

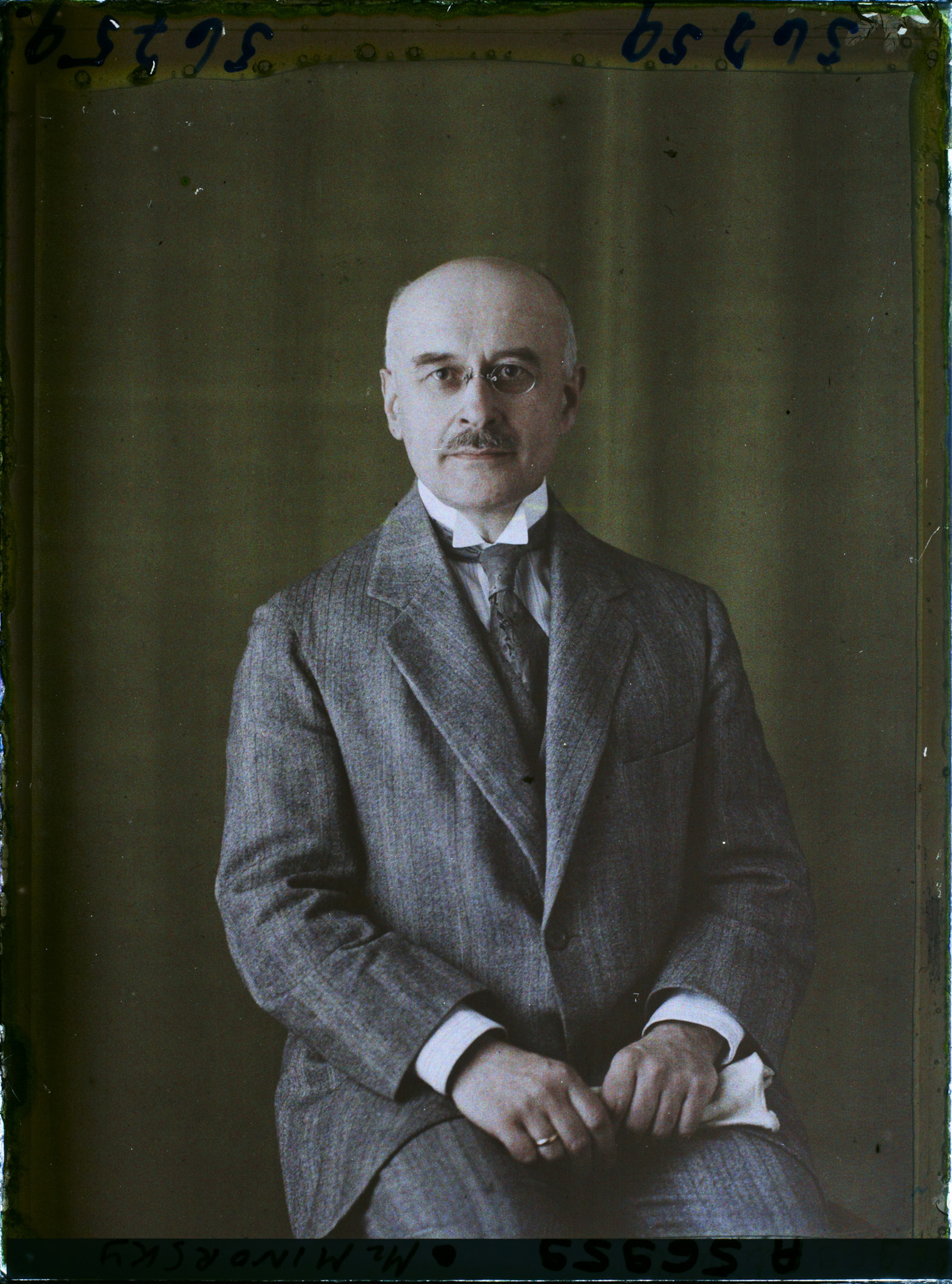
- Portrait by Georges Chevalier, 1928
- Born: Vladimir Fyodorovich Minorsky; 5 February 1877; Korcheva, Tver Governorate, Russian Empire
- Died: 25 March 1966 (aged 89); Cambridgeshire, United Kingdom
- Resting place: Novodevichy Cemetery, Moscow
- Education: Moscow University; Lazarev Institute of Oriental Languages
- Spouse: Tatiana Shebunina (1894 – 1987)
- Children: Theodore (Fyodor) Minorsky (1916 – 1950)
- Scientific career
- Fields: Oriental studies; Iranistics; Islamic studies; Kurdology; Mongolistics; Turkology
- Workplaces: École nationale des langues orientales vivantes; Burlington House; School of Oriental and African Studies (University of London); Fuad University
- Notable students: George de Roerich; Tatyana Aristova; C. E. Bosworth; Roger Savory

Vladimir Fyodorovich Minorsky (Russian: Владимир Фёдорович Минорский; 5 February [O.S. 24 January] 1877 – 25 March 1966) was a White Russian academic, historian, and scholar of Oriental studies, best known for his contributions to the study of history of Iran and the Iranian peoples such as Persians, Lurs, and Kurds in addition to the Kartvelian Laz people.

== Life and career ==
Minorsky was born on 5 February 1877 in Korcheva, Tver Governorate, northwest of Moscow on the upper Volga River, a town now submerged beneath the Ivankovo Reservoir. His father was Feodor M. Minorsky and his mother was Olga Minorsky (née Golubitsky). He was a gold medallist of the Fourth Grammar School in Moscow. In 1896 he entered Moscow University to study law, graduating in 1900, then entered the Lazarev Institute of Oriental Languages, where he spent 3 years preparing for a diplomatic career. He made his first trip to Qajar Persia in 1902, where he collected material on the Ahl-i Ḥaqq religion.

In 1903 he entered the Russian Ministry of Foreign Affairs, serving as a diplomat in Persia, first in the Tabriz Consulate-General and then the Legation of Tehran (1904–1908), and in Saint Petersburg (1908–1912). In 1911, jointly the Four-Power (British, Russian, Turkish, and Persian) Commission, he carried out a mission in northwestern Persia to delimit the Turco–Persian border, and also published a monograph on the Ahl-i Ḥaqq religion, for which he was awarded the Gold Medal of the Ethnography Section of the Imperial Society of Natural Sciences in Moscow.

One of the most important Kurdish manuscripts he obtained during this period was The Forqan ol-Akhbar, by Hajj Nematollah, which he later wrote about in "Etudes sur les Ahl-I Haqq, I.", Revue de L'Histoire des Religions, tome XCVII, No. 1, Janvier 1928, pp. 90–105. His surveys in Persia also provided invaluable material for his 1915 work, Materialï dlya izucheniya vostoka ("Materials for the Study of the East"), published by the Imperial Russian Ministry of Foreign Affairs, Saint Petersburg.

From 1915 to 1917 he served as chargé d'affaires in the Russian Legation at Tehran, Persia. As the Bolshevik Revolution of 1917 made problematic his return to Russia, in 1919 he moved to Paris, France where he worked at the Russian Embassy. There, his expertise in Middle Eastern and Caucasian affairs was useful during the Versailles and Trianon peace settlements.

In 1923 he began to lecture on Persian literature at the École nationale des langues orientales vivantes, where he subsequently taught Turkology and Islamic studies. In 1930 he was named Oriental Secretary to the 1931 International Exhibition of Persian Art at Burlington House, London, and in 1932 was made lecturer in Persian at the School of Oriental and African Studies (SOAS), University of London. In 1933 he became Reader in Persian Literature and History, University of London; Professor of Persian in 1937; and in 1944 retired. In 1934, Minorsky was one of the distinguished participants in the Ferdowsi Millenary Celebration in Tehran, Imperial State of Persia. During World War II, SOAS had evacuated to University of Cambridge, and there the Minorskys retired apart from a year (1948–49) at Fuad University in Cairo, Kingdom of Egypt.

In 1960, Minorsky was invited by the Soviet Academy of Sciences to attend the meeting of the Twenty-Third International Congress of Orientalists in Moscow, but he never returned in Russia after the Bolshevik Revolution. After his death, his ashes were interred in the Novodevichy Cemetery, which was reserved exclusively for outstanding artists, literary men, composers, scholars, etc.; the bulk of his personal library was given to Leningrad.

Minorsky received numerous honors during his lifetime, including being made a Corresponding Fellow of the British Academy, 1943, Honorary Member of the Société Asiatique of Paris, 1946, and Doctor honoris causa of the University of Brussels, 1948.

== Selected works ==
Minorsky was a prolific scholar, having published over 200 books and articles.

- "Ahl-I Hakk", in The Encyclopaedia of Islam.
- "Notes sur la secte des Ahl-I Haqq", in Revue du Monde Musulman, Volumes XL, 1920, pp. 20–97; XLIV-XLV, 1921, 205–302.
- Notes sur la secte des Ahle-Haqq, in book form, Paris, 1922, 182 pp., 1920.
- La Perse au xve siècle entre la Turquise et Venise, Paris: Leroux, 1933.
- "The Guran", Bulletin of the School of Oriental and African Studies, Volume, XI, 1943–1946, PP. 75–103.
- Studies in Caucasian history, Cambridge University Press, 1957.
- Medieval Iran and its neighbours, London, 1982. Reprint of journal articles in English or French published 1931–1967, with passages in Arabic, Gûrâni-Kurdish, Persian, and Turkic languages.
- A History of Sharvan and Darband in the 10th-11th Centuries, Cambridge, 1958.

== See also ==
- Vasily Bartold
- Richard Nelson Frye
- Roman Ghirshman

== Sources ==
- Bosworth, C. E. (2004-07-20). "MINORSKY, Vladimir Fed'orovich". Encyclopædia Iranica.
- Bosworth, C. E., ed. (1971). Iran and Islam: in memory of the late Vladimir Minorsky. Edinburgh University Press. ISBN 0-85224-200-X.
- Lang, D. M. (1966). "Obituary: Vladimir Fedorovich Minorsky". Bulletin of the School of Oriental and African Studies. 29 (3). University of London: 694–69. doi:10.1017/s0041977x0007422x.
- "Мино́рский Владимир Федорович" [Minorsky Vladimir Fedorovich]. Bolshaya sovetskaya entsoklopediya (in Russian). Vol. 16: Meziya - Morshansk. Moskva: Bolshaya sovetskaya entsoklopediya.
- Volkov, Denis V. (2022). "Bringing democracy into Iran: a Russian project for the separation of Azerbaijan". Middle Eastern Studies. 58 (6): 989–1003. doi:10.1080/00263206.2022.2029423. S2CID 246923610.
- Safanova, N. G. (2008). "В.Ф.Минорский (1877-1966) и его вклад в курдоведение" [V.F. Minorsky (1877–1966) and His Contribution to Kurdish Studies] (PDF). Pismennye Pamyatniki Vostoka (in Russian). 1 (8). St. Petersburg: Institute of Oriental Manuscripts of the Russian Academy of Sciences: 223–228.
- Shahbazi, A.S. (January 26, 2012). Ehsan Yarshater (ed.). "Ferdowsi, Abu'l-Qāsem IV. Millenary Celebration". Encyclopædia Iranica. Encyclopædia Iranica Foundation.
