= Mehdiyev =

Mehdiyev is a family name of Azerbaijani origins; the female form is Mehdiyeva. It may refer to:

- Agha Mehdiyev (1920–2003) Azerbaijani painter
- Agshin Mehdiyev (born 1949) Azerbaijani diplomat and ambassador
- Altay Mehdiyev Azerbaijani military leader in the Air Force
- Ilham Mehdiyev (born 1965) Azerbaijani military leader
- Mammadali Mehdiyev (born 1993) Azerbaijani judoka
- Rafig Mehdiyev (1933–2009) Azerbaijani painter and teacher
- Ramiz Mehdiyev (born 1938) Azerbaijani politician and academician
- Rauf Mehdiyev (born 1976) Azerbaijani football goalkeeper
- Safar Mehdiyev (born 1973) Azerbaijani politician and military leader
- Tajaddin Mehdiyev (born 1946) Azerbaijani politician and military leader
- Vugar Mehdiyev, Azerbaijani paralympic athlete
- Tofig Mahmud (1931–1997), né Tofig Mahmud oghlu Mehdiyev; Azerbaijani poet, writer, translator, and publicist
