= Həftəsov =

- Municipality
- Location within Azerbaijan
- Coordinates: 40°53′06″N 48°24′21″E
- Country: Azerbaijan
- Rayon: Ismailli

Population
  - Total: 71
- Time zone: UTC+4 (AZT)
  - Summer (DST): UTC+5 (AZT)

Həftəsov (also, Hərtəsou, Hərtəsov, Gaftasiab, Gaftasiyab, and Gaftasov) is a village and municipality in the Ismailli Rayon of Azerbaijan, approximately 6 km (3.7 mi) north of Lahic. It has a population of 71.
