= Soltankənd =

Soltankənd or Soltankend may refer to:

- Soltankənd, Ismailli, Azerbaijan
- Soltankənd, Jalilabad, Azerbaijan
