= Qıçatan =

- Municipality
- Location within Azerbaijan
- Coordinates: 40°43′48″N 48°25′25″E
- Country: Azerbaijan
- Rayon: Ismailli

Population
  - Total: 148
- Time zone: UTC+4 (AZT)
  - Summer (DST): UTC+5 (AZT)

Qıçatan (also, Kichatan and Kychatan) is a village and municipality in the Ismailli Rayon of Azerbaijan. It has a population of 148.
