= Yuxarı Cülyan =

- Municipality
- Location within Azerbaijan
- Coordinates: 40°53′01″N 48°16′58″E
- Country: Azerbaijan
- Rayon: Ismailli

Population
  - Total: 187
- Time zone: UTC+4 (AZT)
  - Summer (DST): UTC+5 (AZT)

Yuxarı Cülyan (also, Dzhyul’yan and Dzhul’yan) is a village and municipality in the Ismailli Rayon of Azerbaijan. It has a population of 187. The municipality consists of the villages of Cülyan, Daxar, and Mulux.
