= Şəbiyan =

- Municipality
- Location within Azerbaijan
- Coordinates: 40°41′29″N 48°17′20″E
- Country: Azerbaijan
- Rayon: Ismailli

Population
  - Total: 378
- Time zone: UTC+4 (AZT)
  - Summer (DST): UTC+5 (AZT)

Şəbiyan (also, Shabian and Shabiyan) is a village and municipality in the Ismailli Rayon of Azerbaijan. It has a population of 378. The municipality consists of the villages of Şəbiyan, Bəhliyan, and Bilistan.
