= Qurbanəfəndi =

- Municipality
- Location within Azerbaijan
- Coordinates: 40°52′47″N 48°06′30″E
- Country: Azerbaijan
- Rayon: Ismailli

Population
  - Total: 1,041
- Time zone: UTC+4 (AZT)
  - Summer (DST): UTC+5 (AZT)

Qurbanəfəndi (also, Kurbanefeidili, Kurbanefendi, and Kurbanefendili) is a village and municipality in the Ismailli Rayon of Azerbaijan. It has a population of 1,041.
