= Sərdahar =

- Municipality
- Location within Azerbaijan
- Coordinates: 40°46′33″N 48°19′00″E
- Country: Azerbaijan
- Rayon: Ismailli

Population
  - Total: 193
- Time zone: UTC+4 (AZT)
  - Summer (DST): UTC+5 (AZT)

Sərdahar (also, Sərdakhar) is a village and municipality in the Ismailli Rayon of Azerbaijan. It has a population of 193.
