= Burovdal =

- Municipality
- Location within Azerbaijan
- Coordinates: 40°56′34″N 48°22′17″E
- Country: Azerbaijan
- Rayon: Ismailli

Population
  - Total: 204
- Time zone: UTC+4 (AZT)
  - Summer (DST): UTC+5 (AZT)

Burovdal (also, Bruydal and Buravdal) is a village and municipality in the Ismailli Rayon of Azerbaijan. It has a population of 204.
