= Uştal =

Uştal Ուշտալ • Ushtal
- Municipality
- Location within Azerbaijan
- Coordinates: 40°42′39″N 47°59′31″E
- Country: Azerbaijan
- District: Ismayilli

Population
  - Total: 440
- Time zone: UTC+4 (AZT)

Uştal (Ushtal; Armenian: Ուշտալ) is a village and municipality in the Ismayilli District of Azerbaijan. It has a population of 440. The village had an Armenian population before the exodus of Armenians from Azerbaijan after the outbreak of the Nagorno-Karabakh conflict.
