= Pirəqanım =

- Location within Azerbaijan
- Coordinates: 40°51′N 48°20′E
- Country: Azerbaijan
- Rayon: Ismailli
- Municipality: Müdrəsə

Population (2014)
  - Total: 2
- Time zone: UTC+4 (AZT)
  - Summer (DST): UTC+5 (AZT)

Pirəqanım (also, Pir-Agany and Piraganym) is a village in the Ismailli Rayon of Azerbaijan. The village forms part of the municipality of Müdrəsə. According to Azerbaijan's State Statistics Committee, only two people lived in the village as of 2014.
