= Yukhary Bugur =

- Location within Azerbaijan
- Coordinates: 40°58′11″N 48°12′24″E
- Country: Azerbaijan
- Rayon: Ismailli
- Time zone: UTC+4 (AZT)
  - Summer (DST): UTC+5 (AZT)

Yukhary Bugur is a village in the Ismailli Rayon of Azerbaijan.
