= Hacıhətəmli =

- Municipality
- Location within Azerbaijan
- Coordinates: 40°42′08″N 47°54′13″E
- Country: Azerbaijan
- Rayon: Ismailli

Population
  - Total: 2,421
- Time zone: UTC+4 (AZT)
  - Summer (DST): UTC+5 (AZT)

Hacıhətəmli (also, Gadzhi-Atamli, Gadzhigatamli, and Gadzhygatamli) is a village and municipality in the Ismailli Rayon of Azerbaijan. It has a population of 2,421.
