= Tağlabiyan =

- Municipality
- Location within Azerbaijan
- Coordinates: 40°46′18″N 48°22′10″E
- Country: Azerbaijan
- Rayon: Ismailli

Population
  - Total: 322
- Time zone: UTC+4 (AZT)
  - Summer (DST): UTC+5 (AZT)

Tağlabiyan (or Taglabiyan) is a village and municipality in the Ismailli Rayon of Azerbaijan. It has a population of 322. The municipality consists of the villages of Tağlabiyan and Kəlfərəc.
