= Kürdmaşı =

- Municipality
- Location within Azerbaijan
- Coordinates: 40°40′33″N 48°02′31″E
- Country: Azerbaijan
- Rayon: Ismailli

Population
  - Total: 2,997
- Time zone: UTC+4 (AZT)
  - Summer (DST): UTC+5 (AZT)

Kürdmaşı (also, Kyurdmashi, Kyurdmashy, and Kyurtmashi) is a village and municipality in the Ismailli Rayon of Azerbaijan. It has a population of 2,997.
