= Maçaxı =

- Municipality
- Location within Azerbaijan
- Coordinates: 40°44′N 48°19′E
- Country: Azerbaijan
- Rayon: Ismailli

Population
  - Total: 136
- Time zone: UTC+4 (AZT)
  - Summer (DST): UTC+5 (AZT)

Maçaxı (also, Machakhi and Machakhy) is a village and municipality in the Ismailli Rayon of Azerbaijan. It has a population of 136.
