= Bəhliyan =

- Location within Azerbaijan
- Coordinates: 40°40′23″N 48°18′03″E
- Country: Azerbaijan
- Rayon: Ismailli
- Municipality: Şəbiyan
- Time zone: UTC+4 (AZT)
  - Summer (DST): UTC+5 (AZT)

Bəhliyan (also, Bakhliin and Bakhliyan) is a village in the Ismailli Rayon of Azerbaijan. The village forms part of the municipality of Şəbiyan.
