= Qarakolluq =

- Municipality
- Location within Azerbaijan
- Coordinates: 40°42′N 48°02′E
- Country: Azerbaijan
- Rayon: Ismailli

Population
  - Total: 219
- Time zone: UTC+4 (AZT)
  - Summer (DST): UTC+5 (AZT)

Qarakolluq (also, Karakëlluk) is a village and municipality in the Ismailli Rayon of Azerbaijan. It has a population of 219.
