= Lahij Museum of Local History =

Museum of Local History in Lahij
- Lahıc tarix-diyarşunaslıq muzeyi
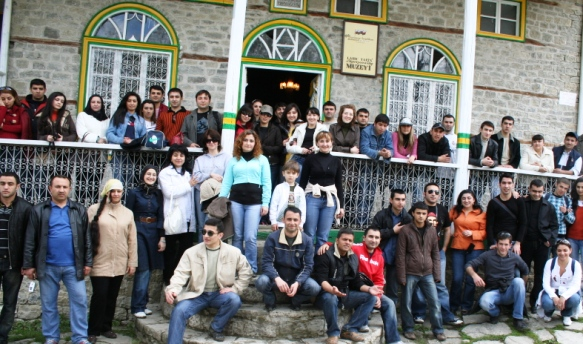
- Photo of a tourist group at the museum.
- Established: 1985
- Location: Lahij, Ismailli Rayon, Azerbaijan
- Coordinates: 40.8452°N 48.3832°E

Museum of local history of Lahij village (Azerbaijani: Lahıc tarix-diyarşunaslıq muzeyi) – was founded in 1985 and located in Lahıc village in Ismailli rayon of Azerbaijan. Aliyev Maarif Aghamehedi oglu is a main keeper of the museum.

== History of the museum ==
The museum was opened in 1985 within Lahic Historical-Cultural Reserve. Initially it was a part of historic-cultural natural reserve, but since 1992 it functions as an independent cultural object. The museum itself is located within a building which is famed as “Aghaoglu mosque” in Lahij and was built in 1914.

== Exhibition ==
Exposition of the museum consists of more than 1000 exhibits in 10 sections. The exhibits consist of ancient examples of craftsmanship including pottery samples dating 2000 years back, bellows made in the 18th century to use in copper smelting, and other pieces associated with animal husbandry and trade, as well as information about the underground water line installed in the 15th century.

== Interesting facts ==
Kamilli Tofig Kamil oglu, a representative of the museum, participated in national trainings for trainers-specialists of museum work from the Republic of Azerbaijan by museum management using UNESCO/ICOM’s publications, held on April 20-22, 2009 in Baku.

== Gallery ==
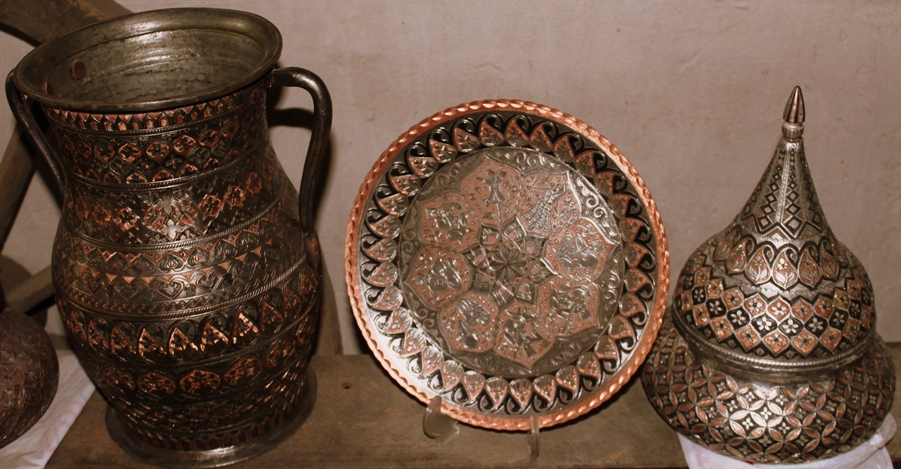

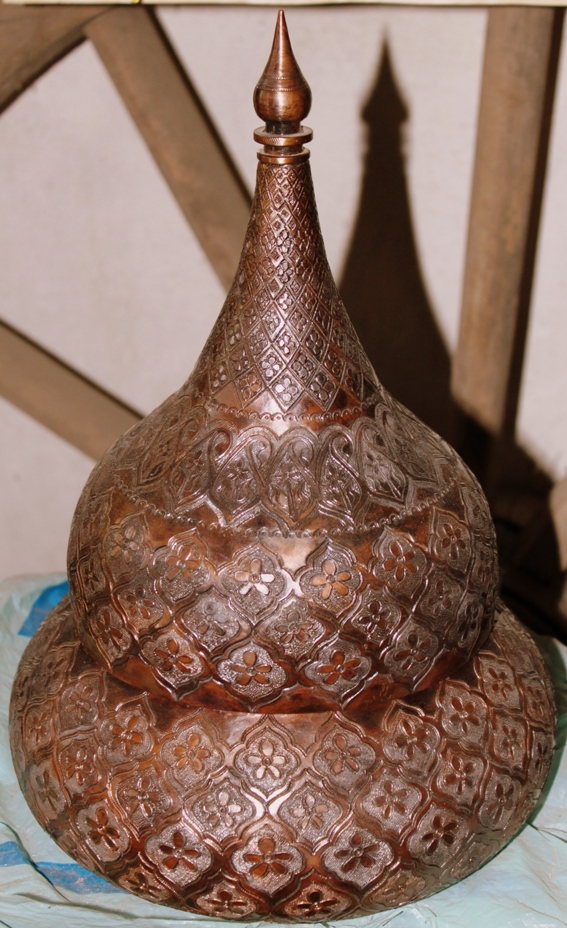

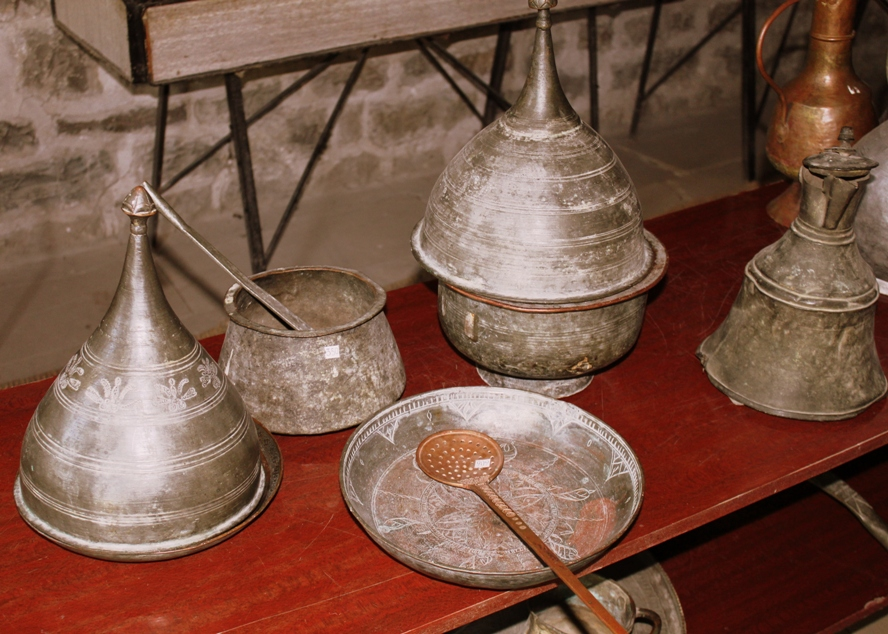

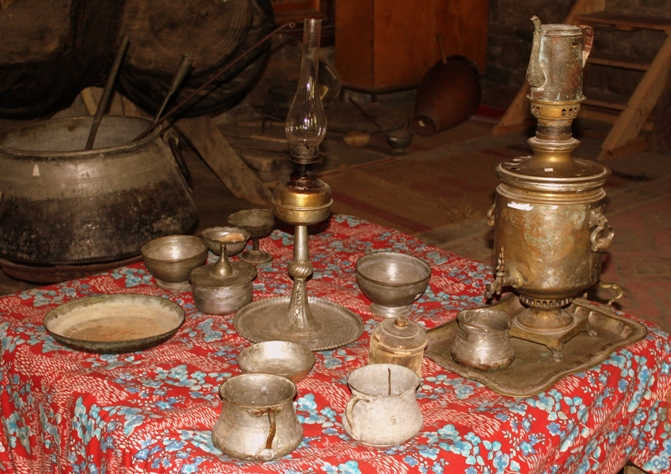

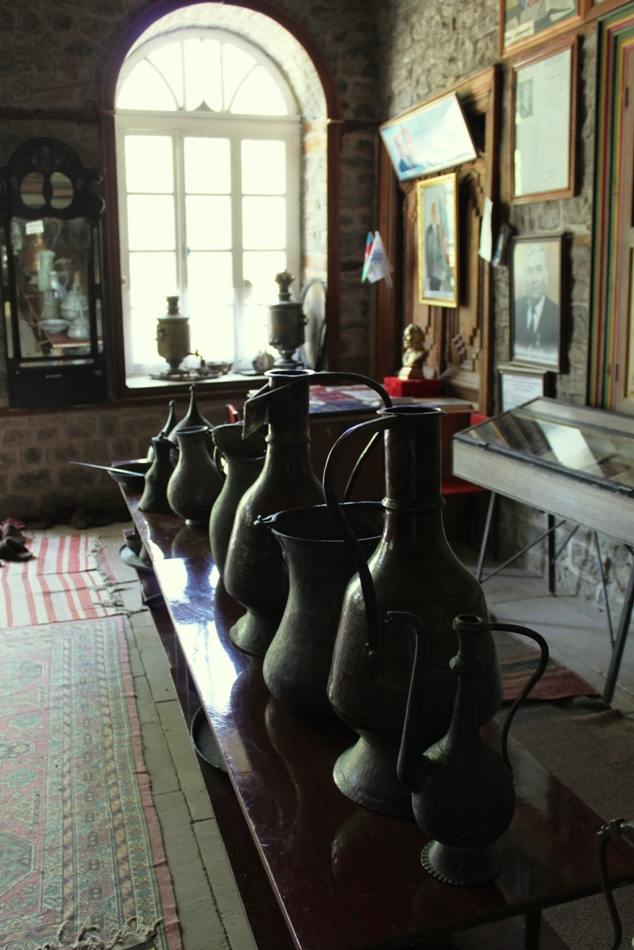
