= Valasin =

- Location within Azerbaijan
- Coordinates: 40°57′N 48°10′E
- Country: Azerbaijan
- Rayon: Ismailli
- Time zone: UTC+4 (AZT)
  - Summer (DST): UTC+5 (AZT)

Valasin (also, Velesikend and Velyasy) is a village in the Ismailli Rayon of Azerbaijan.
