= Garanohur =

Lake in Azerbaijan

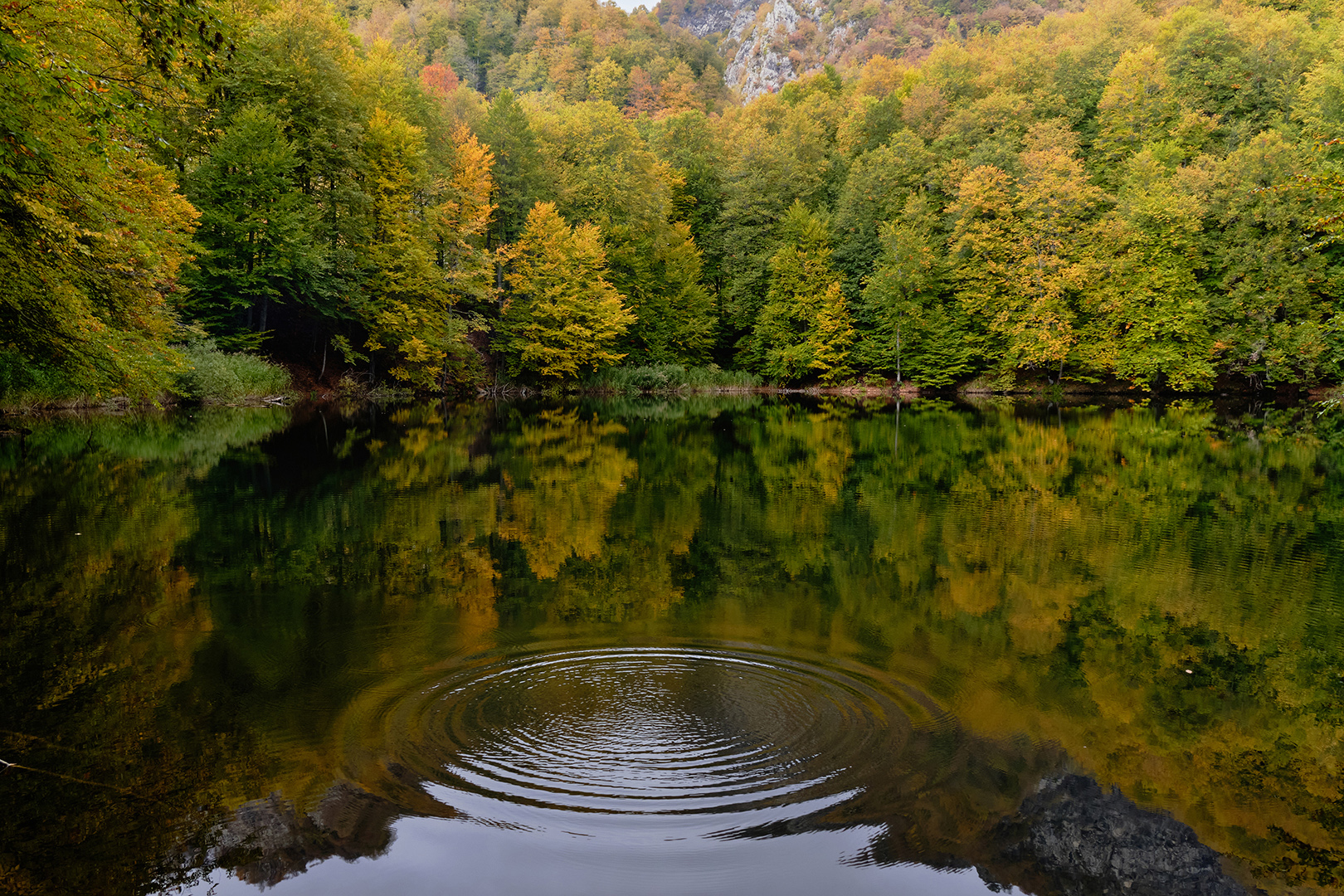

- Location within Azerbaijan
- Interactive map of Garanohur
- Location: Shahdag National Park, Ismayilli , Azerbaijan
- Coordinates: 40°48′46″N 48°15′03″E
- Basin countries: Azerbaijan
- Max. length: 0.12 kilometres (0.075 mi)
- Max. width: 0.1 kilometres (0.062 mi)
- Surface area: 0.009 square kilometres (0.0035 sq mi)
- Surface elevation: 1,537 metres (5,043 ft)

Garanohur (Azerbaijani: Qaranohur - from Azerbaijani gara - "black" and nour, nohur - "lake", "reservoir", "swamp") is an alpine lake located in the Ismayilli district of Azerbaijan (8 km northeast of the city of Ismayilli), at an altitude of about 1520 m above sea level, in the basin of the Garanohurchay river, in the Greater Caucasus.

Before the asphalt road to Lahij was laid in 1966, the town of Garanohur served for a long time as a transit point from the city of Ismayilli to Lahij. According to the director of the Ismayilli Tourist Information Centre S. Suleymanov, the lake Garanohur is one of the places for future tourism in the region.

== Characteristics ==
The mineralization of water in the lake is high and exceeds 1000 mg/l. The waters of this lake are unsuitable for agricultural crops.

In summer, the average water temperature is around 15 °C. In 1959-1960 researchers H. I. Zamanov and R. B. Tarverdiyev carried out hydrological work of researching the lake and at the same time made observations of the temperature of its waters. As a result of the study, different durations of rise and fall of water temperature during the day were found in the lake. In addition to this, it was found that the water temperature changes in a horizontal direction, mainly due to changes in the depth of the lake. Thus, the authors found that with distance from the coast, the water temperature in the surface layer decreases, and the amplitude ranges from 27.7 °C to 18.0 °C.

In Garanohur, with distance from the shore, an increase in transparency is found, which reaches its maximum in the middle of the lake.
