= Gərməxana =

- Location within Azerbaijan
- Coordinates: 40°43′N 48°09′E
- Country: Azerbaijan
- Rayon: Ismailli

Population
  - Total: 0
- Time zone: UTC+4 (AZT)
  - Summer (DST): UTC+5 (AZT)

Gərməxana is a former village in what is now the Ismailli Rayon of Azerbaijan. It suffered from a devastating fire in 1902.
