= Tircan =

- Municipality
- Location within Azerbaijan
- Coordinates: 40°44′20″N 48°20′01″E
- Country: Azerbaijan
- Rayon: Ismailli

Population
  - Total: 1,375
- Time zone: UTC+4 (AZT)
  - Summer (DST): UTC+5 (AZT)

Tircan (also, Tirdzhan) is a village and municipality in the Ismailli Rayon of Azerbaijan, a nation bordered by Iran, Russia, Georgia, and Armenia. It has a population of 1,375.
