= Kəlfərəc =

- Location within Azerbaijan
- Coordinates: 40°46′21″N 48°21′48″E
- Country: Azerbaijan
- Rayon: Ismailli
- Municipality: Tağlabiyan
- Time zone: UTC+4 (AZT)
  - Summer (DST): UTC+5 (AZT)

Kəlfərəc (also, Kalfaradzh and Kel’farach) is a village in the Ismailli Rayon of Azerbaijan. The village forms part of the municipality of Tağlabiyan.
