= Aşıqbayramlı =

- Municipality
- Location within Azerbaijan
- Coordinates: 40°42′55″N 48°02′49″E
- Country: Azerbaijan
- Rayon: Ismailli

Population
  - Total: 765
- Time zone: UTC+4 (AZT)
  - Summer (DST): UTC+5 (AZT)

Aşıqbayramlı (also, Ashygbayramly and Ashykhbayramly) is a village and municipality in the Ismailli Rayon of Azerbaijan. It has a population of 765.
