= Uştalqışlaq =

Village and municipality in Azerbaijan

Coordinates: 40°41′N 48°00′E

Uştalqışlaq is a village and municipality in the Ismailli Rayon of Azerbaijan.

== Climate ==
Uştalqışlaq has a humid continental climate with no dry season. In these types of climates, the coldest month averages to be below 0°C (32°F), at least one month's average temperature above 22°C (71.6°F), and at least four months averaging above 10°C (50°F). Typically, these climates have no significant precipitation difference between seasons.
