= Qoydan =

- Municipality
- Location within Azerbaijan
- Coordinates: 40°53′N 48°26′E
- Country: Azerbaijan
- Rayon: Ismailli

Population
  - Total: 70
- Time zone: UTC+4 (AZT)
  - Summer (DST): UTC+5 (AZT)

Qoydan (also, Koydan) is a village and the least populous municipality in the Ismailli Rayon of Azerbaijan. It has a population of 70.

== Weather ==
The weather of Qoydan, and much of Azerbaijan in general deeply ranges from hot arid summers and to mild winters. During the Summer months it averages near and around 30°C(86°F), but averages 0°C(32°f) during the winter months.
