= Buynuz =

- Municipality
- Location within Azerbaijan
- Coordinates: 40°55′21″N 48°03′43″E
- Country: Azerbaijan
- Rayon: Ismailli

Population
  - Total: 597
- Time zone: UTC+4 (AZT)
  - Summer (DST): UTC+5 (AZT)

Buynuz is a village and municipality in the Ismailli Rayon of Azerbaijan. It has a population of 597.
