= Dahar, İsmayıllı =

Dahar
- Location within Azerbaijan
- Coordinates: 40°52′N 48°19′E
- Country: Azerbaijan
- Rayon: Ismailli
- Municipality: Cülyan

Population (2014)
  - Total: 5
- Time zone: UTC+4 (AZT)
  - Summer (DST): UTC+5 (AZT)

Dahar (also, Daxar and Dakhar) is a village in the Ismailli Rayon of Azerbaijan. The village forms part of the municipality of Cülyan. According to Azerbaijan's State Statistics Committee, only five people lived in the village as of 2014.
