= Cülyan =

- Municipality
- Location within Azerbaijan
- Coordinates: 40°49′09″N 48°10′34″E
- Country: Azerbaijan
- Rayon: Ismailli

Population
  - Total: 1,262
- Time zone: UTC+4 (AZT)
  - Summer (DST): UTC+5 (AZT)

Cülyan (also, Dzhyul’yan and Dzhul’yan) is a village and municipality in the Ismailli Rayon of Azerbaijan. It has a population of 1,262.
