= Müdrəsə =

- Municipality
- Location within Azerbaijan
- Coordinates: 40°51′56″N 48°19′06″E
- Country: Azerbaijan
- Rayon: Ismailli

Population
  - Total: 157
- Time zone: UTC+4 (AZT)
  - Summer (DST): UTC+5 (AZT)

Müdrəsə (also, Mədrəsə, Müdrusə, Myudresa, and Myudryuse) is a village and municipality in the Ismailli Rayon of Azerbaijan. It has a population of 157. The municipality consists of the villages of Müdrəsə and Pirəqanım.
