= Agha Mehdiyev =

Painter

- Ağa Cəfər oğlu Mehdiyev
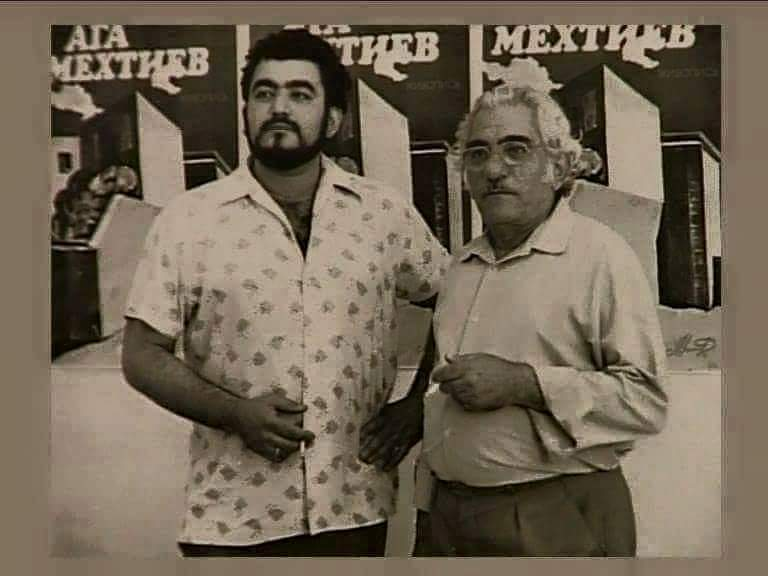
- Agha Mehdiyev and Yagub Mehdiyev
- Born: Agha Jafar oghlu Mehdiyev; March 21, 1920; Lahij, Azerbaijan Democratic Republic
- Died: May 15, 2003 (aged 83); Baku, Azerbaijan
- Known for: painting
- Awards: People's Artist of Azerbaijan Honored Art Worker of the Azerbaijan SSR

Agha Jafar oglu Mehdiyev (Azerbaijani: Ağa Mehdiyev, 21 March 1920 — 15 May 2003) was an Azerbaijani painter, People's Artist of Azerbaijan.

== Biography ==
Agha Mehdiyev was born on 21 March 1920 in Lahij, Ismailli District. He graduated from Painting School named after Azim Azimzade in 1938. He participated in many exhibitions in the USSR. He has worked extensively on landscape and portrait genres, and also on military-patriotism. The artist's historical and revolutionary charts and his works on the classics of Azerbaijani literature are based on an in-depth study of the sources.

Impressions of Turkey visit are reflected in his solo exhibition "Trip to Turkey" (1962), as well as at the exhibition "Foreign Countries Through the Eyes of Azerbaijani Artists" (1964). Many works from this series are included in the museum's expositions: "Istanbul in the Fog" (1960), "Bosphorus After the Rain" (1960) "Evening. Istanbul ”(1961) and others.

In the scenes of A.Mehdiyev, the work, labor and rest of ordinary people were poeticized. In 1987 the artist created the "1937" painting. Agha Mehdiyev was the first painter among Azerbaijani artists, created work about repression.

The artist was a member of the Artists' Union of the USSR since 1994. In 1961, 1970, 1981 and 1988 his personal exhibitions were organized in Baku. Agha Mehdiyev's works have been shown in Germany, Hungary, Romania, Bulgaria, Italy, Sweden, Austria, Canada, France, Japan, Poland, Spain, Turkey, Russia, United States, Egypt, Iraq and other countries.

Agha Mehdiyev died on May 15, 2003, in Baku.

== Awards ==
- Honored Art Worker of the Azerbaijan SSR — 1988
- People's Artist of Azerbaijan — 30 May 2002
- Presidential Pension — 11 June 2002
