= Rafig Mehdiyev =

Azerbaijani painter (1933–2009)

Rafig Mehdiyev Rafiq Mehdiyev
- Born: June 10, 1933; Shahbuz, Shahbuz District, Nakhichevan ASSR, Azerbaijan SSR, TSFSR, USSR
- Died: November 28, 2009 (aged 76); Baku, Azerbaijan
- Occupation: painter
- Children: Rashad Mehdiyev
- Relatives: Tofig Mahmud (brother); Huseyn Mehdiyev (brother)

Rafig Mahmud oghlu Mehdiyev (Azerbaijani: Rafiq Mahmud oğlu Mehdiyev, June 10, 1933–November 28, 2009) was an Azerbaijani painter and professor. He was awarded the title of the People's Artist of Azerbaijan, and served as a professor and chairman of the graphics section of the Union of Artists of Azerbaijan. He was a presidential scholarship holder.

== Biography ==
Rafig Mehdiyev was born on June 10, 1933, in Shahbuz District of Nakhchivan ASSR. He graduated from Azim Azimzade art college (1948–1953), and graphic faculty of Surikov Moscow State Art Institute (1953–1958). He worked as a teacher at A. Azimzade art college (1962), then as a dean at Azerbaijan State Art Institute, and as a teacher at the Azerbaijan State Academy of Fine Arts.

He received the title of associate professor in 1988, and professor in 1992. Since 2003, he has been a presidential pensioner. Mehdiyev was elected several times as a deputy of the Supreme Soviet of the Azerbaijan SSR.

Mehdiyev died in 2009 in Baku.

== Awards ==
- People's Artist of Azerbaijan — 1992
- Honored Artist of the Azerbaijan SSR — December 18, 1980

== See also ==
- List of Azerbaijani artists
