= Shovkat Salimova =

Azerbaijani ship captain (1920–1999)

- Səlimova Şövkət Şahbaz qızı
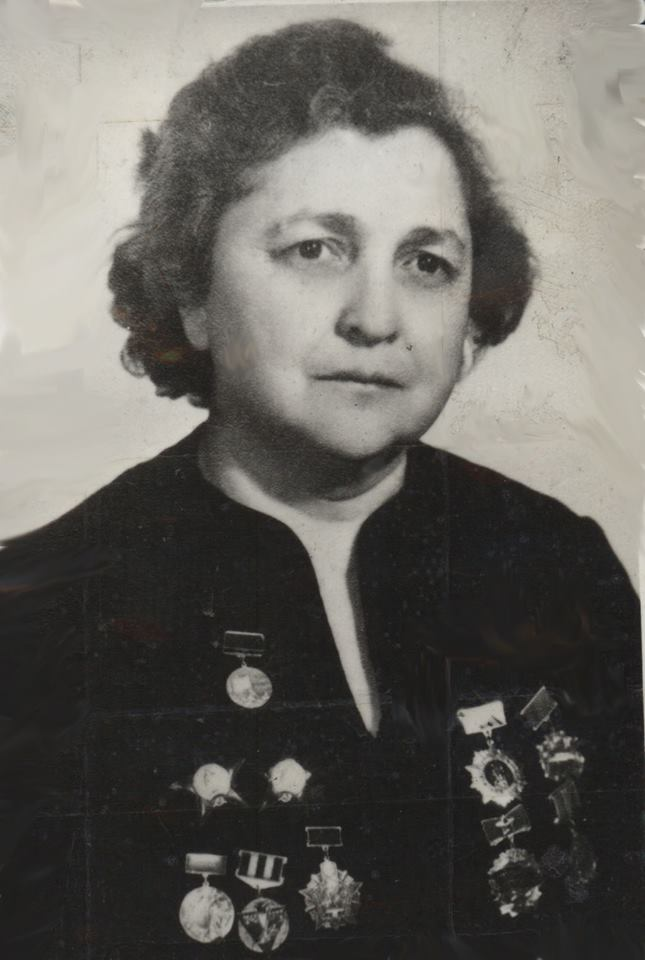
- Born: 25 December 1920; Lahıc, Ismayilli, Azerbaijan Soviet Socialist Republic
- Died: 2 July 1999 (aged 78); Baku, Azerbaijan
- Alma mater: Baku Maritime School
- Military career
- Allegiance: Soviet Union
- Known for: Being Azerbaijan’s first female ship captain and the first Muslim woman to captain a ship in the Middle East
- Awards: Medal "For the Defence of the Caucasus", Medal "For the Victory over Germany in the Great Patriotic War 1941–1945", Order of the Patriotic War, 2nd class Order of the Red Star

Shovkat Salimova (Azerbaijani: Səlimova Şövkət Şahbaz qızı, Russian: Шовкет Шахбаз кызы Салимова, 25 December 1920 – 2 July 1999) was Azerbaijan's first female ship captain and the first Muslim woman to captain a ship in the Middle East.

== Biography ==
Salimova was born on 25 December 1920 in Lahıc, Ismayilli, Azerbaijan Soviet Socialist Republic. She grew up in Baku and was the eldest of ten children in her family. Her father was an oil worker.

Inspired by a portrait of Anna Shetinina, Salimova studied at the Baku Maritime School. She graduated in 1940 and was assigned to the Black Sea Shipping Company.

During World War II, Salimova worked as deputy ship captain then ship captain, delivering weaponry, ammunition and oil to the Soviet front near Stalingrad, USSR, and transporting the wounded soldiers to Baku and Krasnovodsk. She was Azerbaijan's first female ship captain and the first Muslim woman to captain a ship in the Middle East.

After the war, Salimova worked at the Azerbaijan State Oil and Chemistry University. She died on 2 July 1999 in Baku, Azerbaijan.

In 2025 the production of a feature film about Salimova, called Shovkat, was completed. The film features Nazrin Abdullayeva in the role of Salimova and was directed by Asif Rustamov. The film also stars Gurban Ismayilov [az], Hikmat Ragimov [az], Elsever Ragimov and Nigar Mursalova.

== Honours ==
- Medal "For the Defence of the Caucasus"
- Medal "For the Victory over Germany in the Great Patriotic War 1941–1945"
- Order of the Patriotic War, 2nd class
- Order of the Red Star
