= Soltankənd, Ismailli =

Soltankənd
- Municipality
- Location within Azerbaijan
- Coordinates: 40°42′11″N 47°57′34″E
- Country: Azerbaijan
- Rayon: Ismailli

Population
  - Total: 534
- Time zone: UTC+4 (AZT)
  - Summer (DST): UTC+5 (AZT)

Soltankənd (also, Soltankend) is a village and municipality in the Ismailli Rayon of Azerbaijan. It has a population of 534.
