= Manaf Suleymanov =

Azerbaijani writer, translator and historian (1912-2001)

- Born: 3 March 1912; Lahıc, Ismailli, Baku Governorate, Russian Empire
- Died: 12 September 2001 (aged 89); Baku, Azerbaijan
- Occupations: writer, historian, translator

Academic background
- Education: M.Faculty of geological exploration of Azerbaijan petrochemical Institute named after azizbeyov

Manaf Faraj oglu Suleymanov (Azerbaijani: Manaf Fərəc oğlu Süleymanov; 3 March 1912, Lahich – 12 September 2001, Baku) was an Azerbaijani writer, translator and historian.

== Life ==
Manaf Suleymanov was born in 1912, in the village of Lahich in Azerbaijan. He graduated from the Azerbaijan Oil and Chemistry Institute with honours and worked in the Azerbaijan Institute of Industry as an assistant professor. In 1942 he completed his PhD in Geology (kandudat geologo-mineralogicheskikh nauk). Mr. Suleymanov then lectured at several Azerbaijani universities.

As well as for his academic contributions, Manaf Suleymanov is well known in Azerbaijan for his literary work. He wrote several acclaimed novels. Mr. Suleymanov also translated from English to Azerbaijani literary works by Jack London, Somerset Maugham, O. Henry, John Steinbeck, Peter Abrahams and many others.

Manaf Suleymanov undertook historical studies as well. His renowned book What I Heard, What I Saw, What I Read (Past Days in Russian) remains one of the best accounts of the history of Baku at the beginning of the twentieth century. He studied and published biographical articles on many Azerbaijani industrial magnates, oil tycoons, and philanthropists such as Zeynalabdin Taghiyev. His other historical works are Lagich. My Motherland, My Apprenticeship Years.

In 1991 he was awarded the title Azerbaijani Honorary Art Master in recognition of his large contribution to the development of national arts and literature.

Mr. Suleymanov died in 2001 in Baku.

== Books ==
- Yerin sirri, 1948.
- Fırtına, 1960.
- Zirvələrdə, 1973.
- Dalğalar qoynunda, 1977.
- Eşitdiklərim, oxuduqlarım, gördüklərim, 1987 (available online in (in Russian) )
- Bir kitabdan birgac sətir, 1989.
- Zirvələrdə. Roman və hekayələr, 1988.
- Azərbaycan diyarı. Lahıc, 1994.
- Son bahara çatdıq, 1996.
- Neft milyonçusu, 1996.
- Şərqdə ilk demokratik cumhüriyyət, 1999.
- Şagirdlik illərim, 2001.
