= Aghchay =

Aghchay آقچای
- Village
- Location within Iran
- Coordinates: 38°24′N 48°42′E
- Country: Iran
- Province: Gilan
- County: Astara
- Bakhsh: Central
- Rural District: Heyran

Population (2006)
  - Total: ؟
- Time zone: UTC+3:30 (IRST)
  - Summer (DST): UTC+4:30 (IRDT)

Aghchay (Persian: آقچای, also Romanized as Agh Chay) is a village in Heyran Rural District, in the Central District of Astara County, Gilan Province, Iran. The name of the village, ağ çay means "white stream" in Azeri Turkish.
