= Soltankənd, Jalilabad =

Soltankənd
- Municipality
- Location within Azerbaijan
- Coordinates: 39°09′47″N 48°17′12″E
- Country: Azerbaijan
- Rayon: Jalilabad

Population
  - Total: 717
- Time zone: UTC+4 (AZT)
  - Summer (DST): UTC+5 (AZT)

Soltankənd (also, Soltankend and Sultankend) is a village and municipality in the Jalilabad Rayon of Azerbaijan. It has a population of 717.
