= Lahıc, Ismailli =

Lahıc Löhij
- Municipality
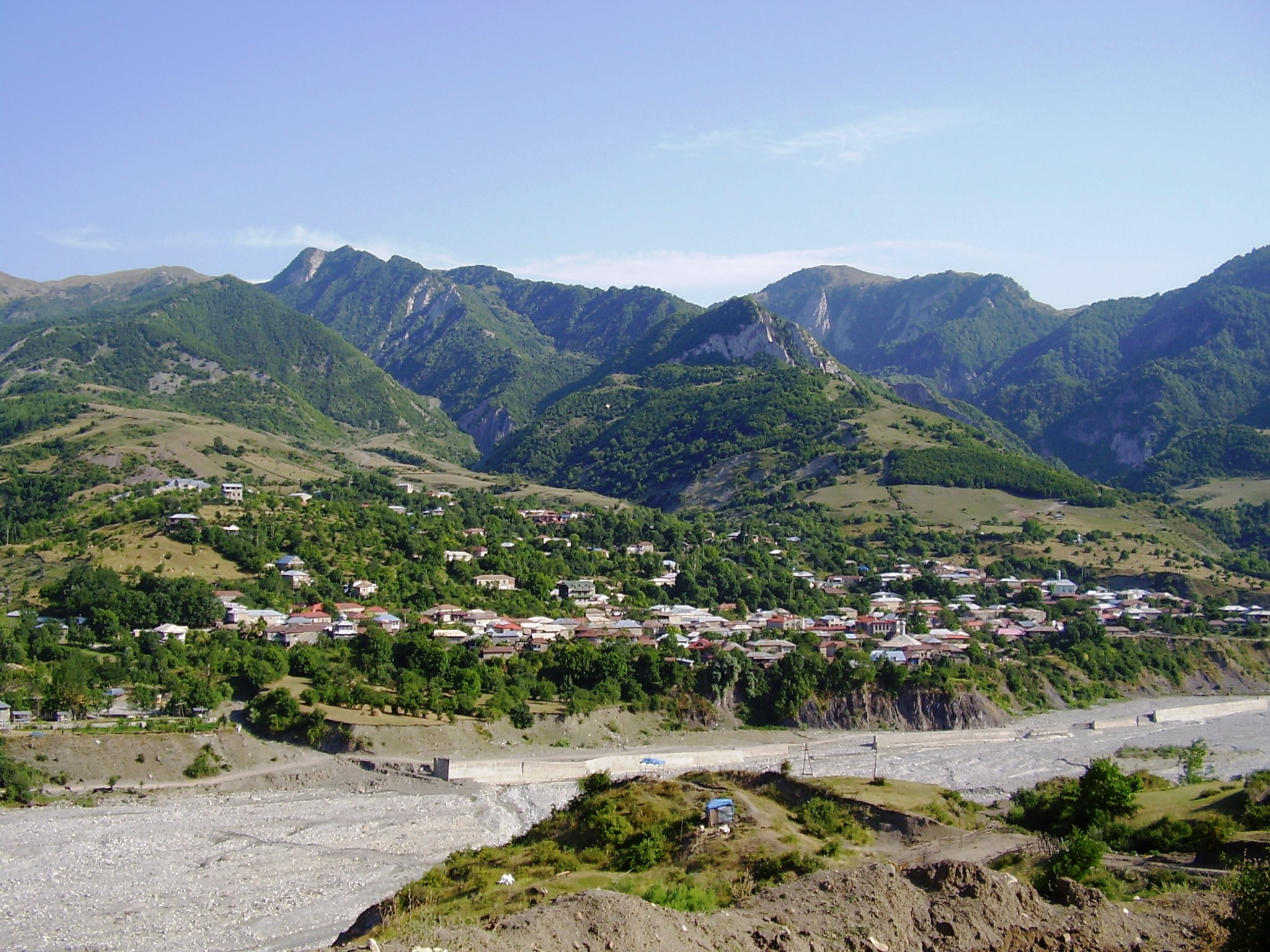
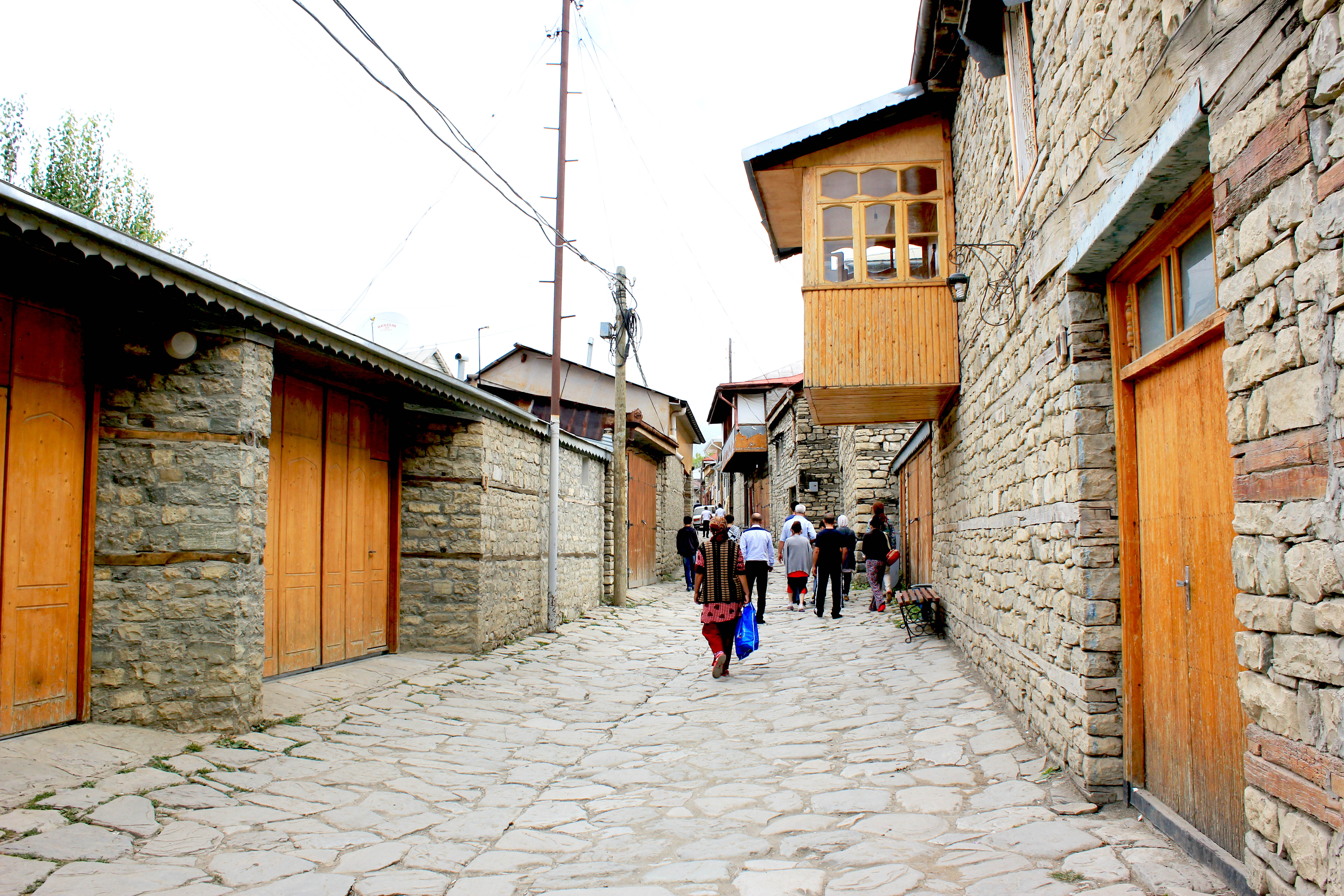
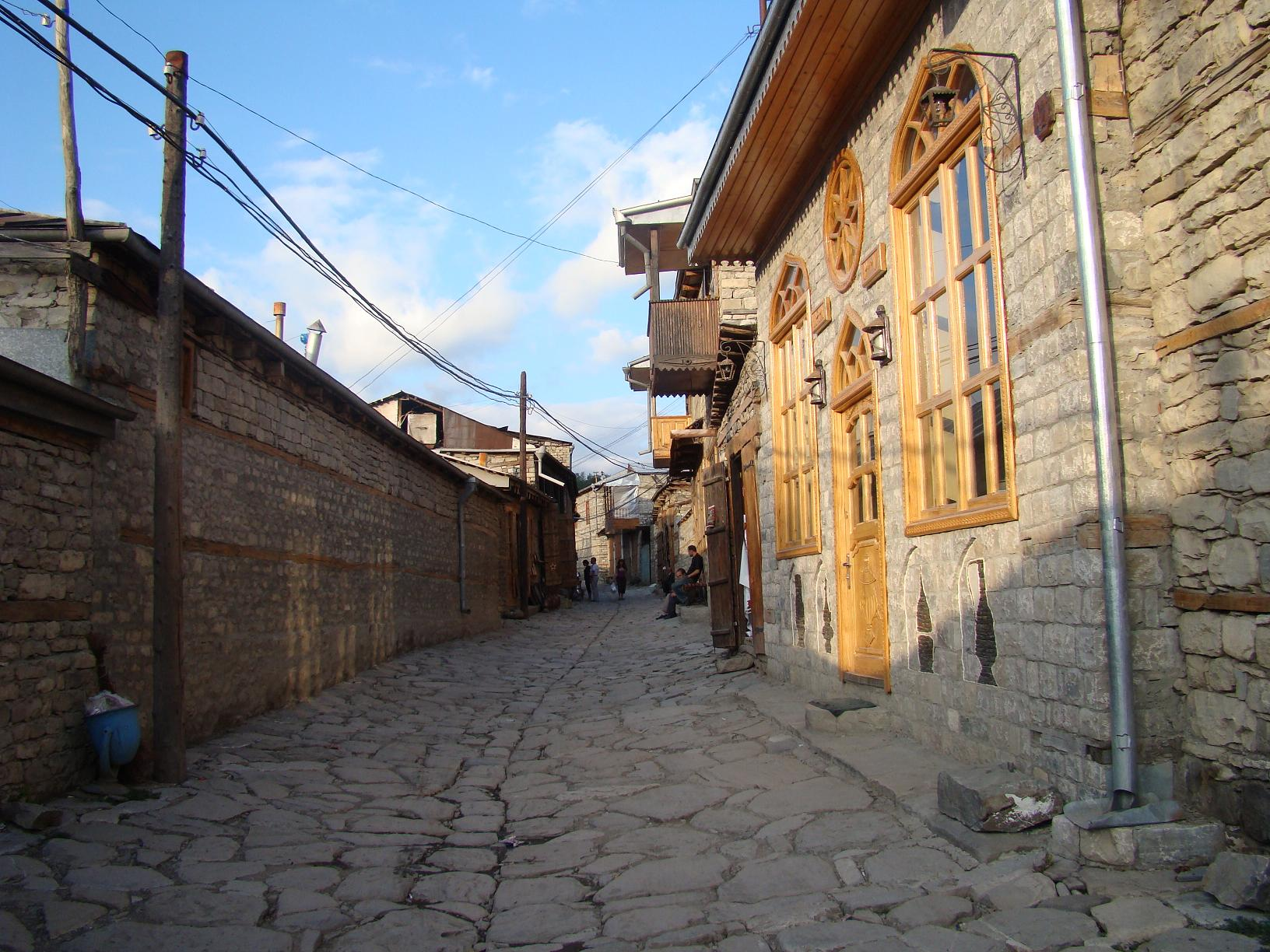
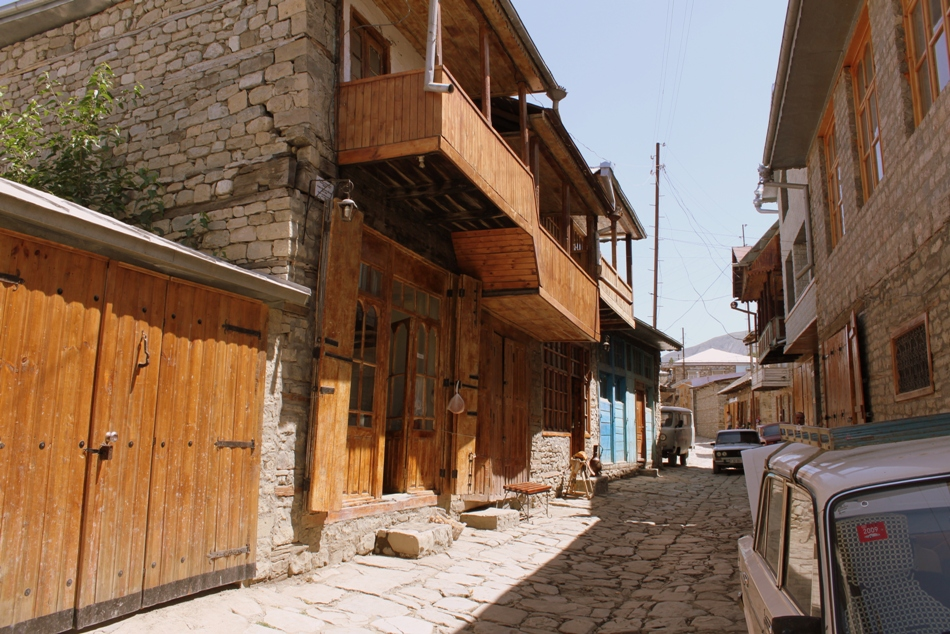
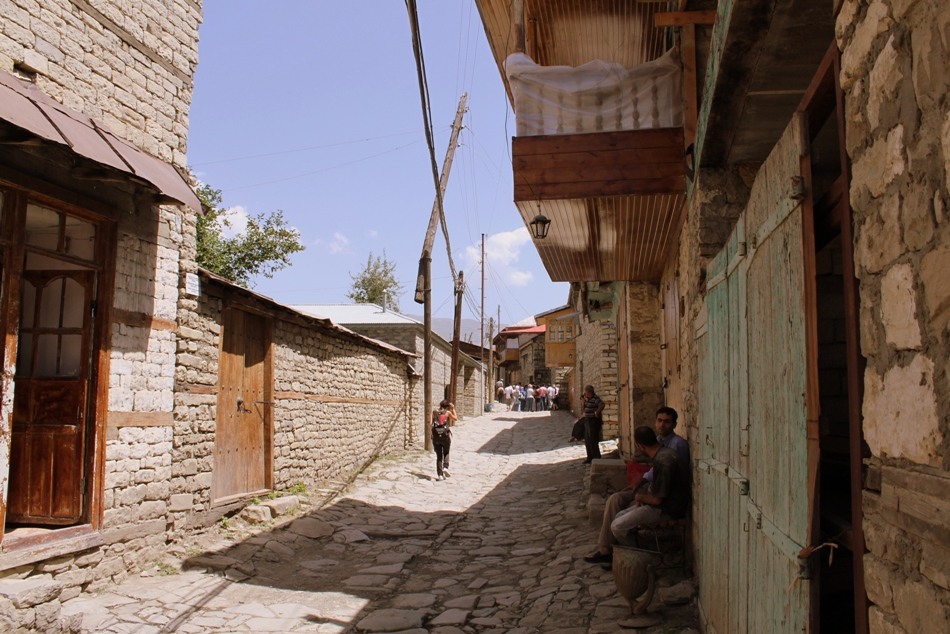
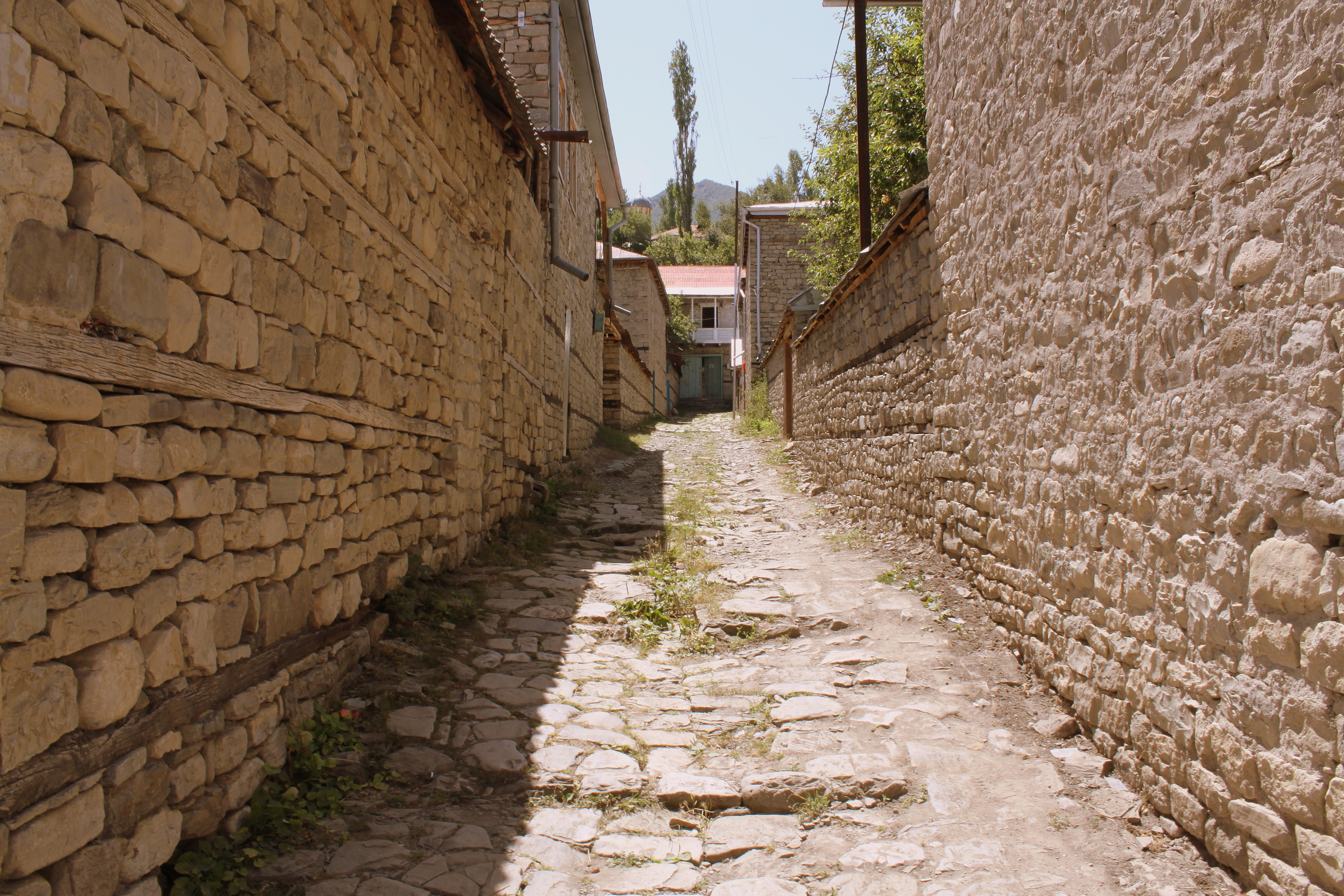
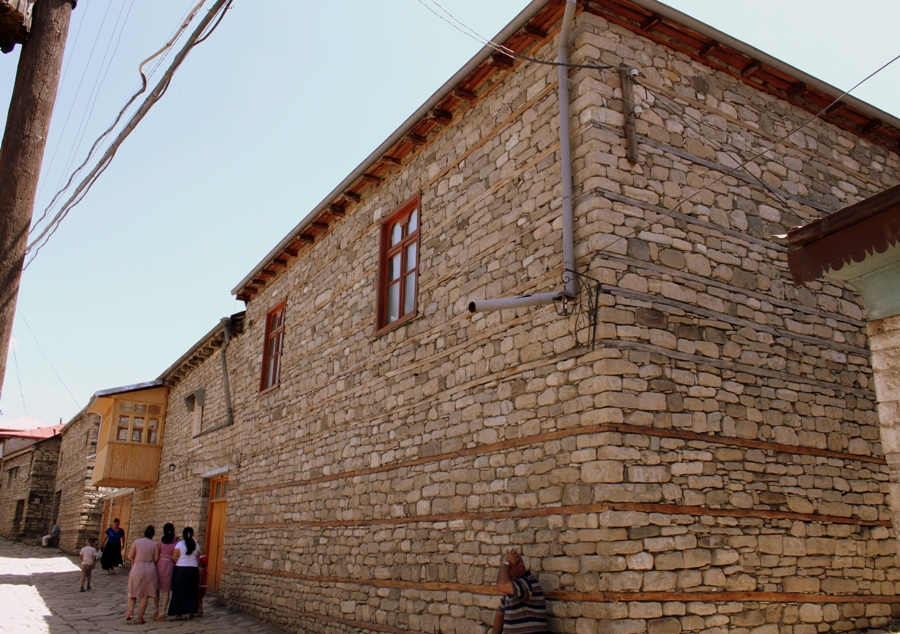
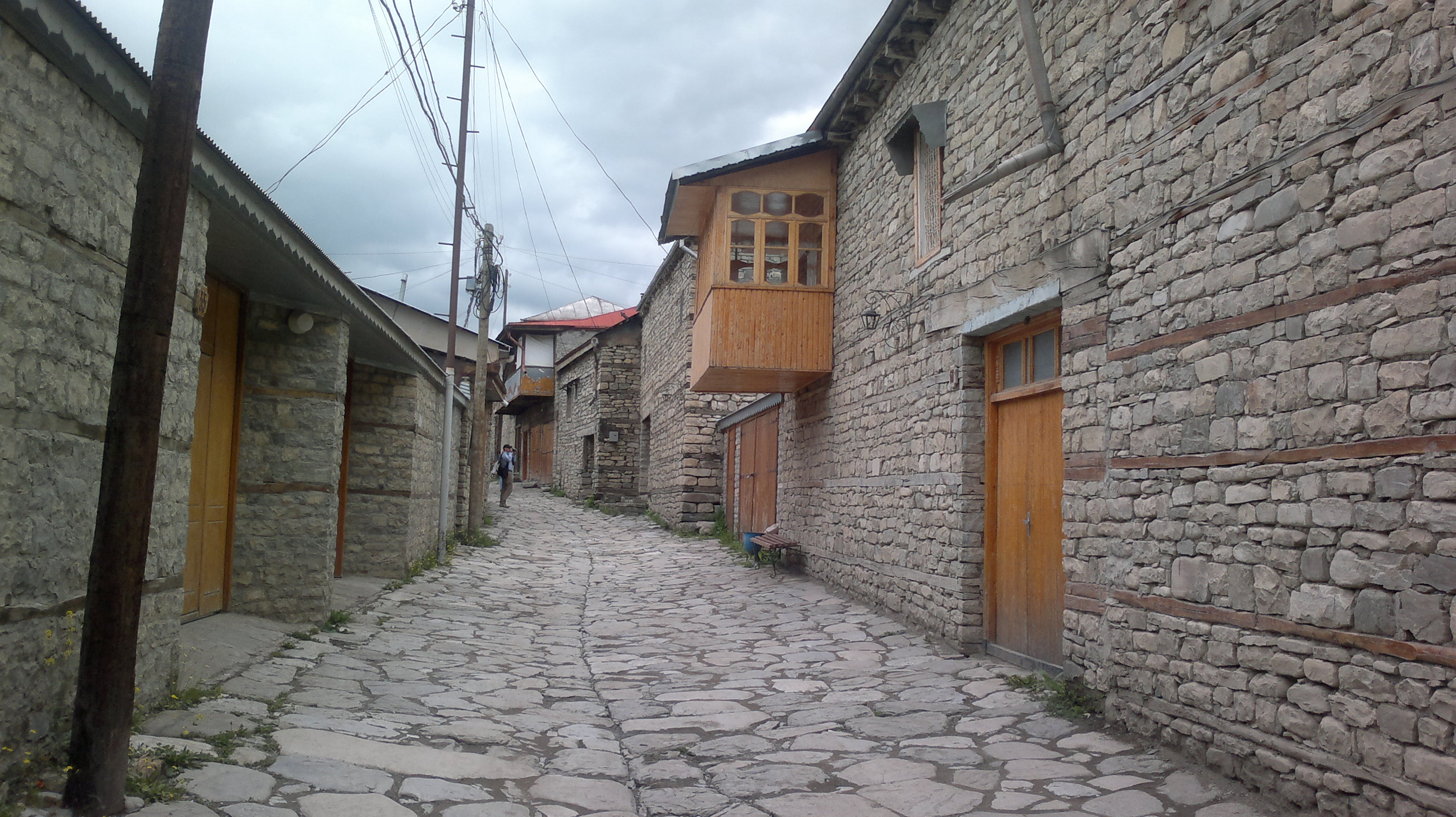

- Location within Azerbaijan
- Coordinates: 40°51′11″N 48°23′35″E
- Country: Azerbaijan
- District: Ismailli
- Elevation: 1,375 m (4,511 ft)

Population (2008)
  - Total: 934
- Time zone: UTC+4 (AZT)
- Website: http://ivanovka.net/

Lahıc (Azerbaijani: Lahıc, Tat: Löhij) is a village and municipality on the southern slopes of Greater Caucasus within the Ismailli Rayon of Azerbaijan. Population is approximately 860 people who speak the Tat language, also known as Tati Persian, a Southwestern Iranian language spoken by the Tats of Azerbaijan and Russia.

Lahij is a notable place in Azerbaijan, with its authentic handicrafts traditions, particularly related to copper. The village's carpet and rug crafts are also well known in Azerbaijan and the South Caucasus. Lahij has an old sewage system (some experts claim that it was built 1000–1500 years ago). Due to frequent earthquakes local people have developed sophisticated and authentic construction techniques.

== History ==
Lahij is one of the most ancient human settlements in Azerbaijan. The Lahij District is located in the Ismayilli region of the Republic of Azerbaijan, on the southern slopes of the Greater Caucasus Mountain Range at a height of 1211 meters above sea level.

During the Medieval Period, Lahij became an important centre of craftsmen in Azerbaijan. Lahij master craftsmen could create forty types of items related to Folk Art. These skilled craftsmen included jewelers, blacksmiths, carpenters, carpet makers, engravers, painters, tanners, shoemakers and bast shoe makers, sock weavers and others. Many valuable examples of the products of these skills are exhibited in famous museums and collections.

== Demographics ==
The majority of the population of Lahij speaks the Tat language The endonym of the locals is Parsi and exonym is Tat. The residents of the region are usually bilingual: besides Tati Persian the Azerbaijani language is also widely spoken.

Located on the left bank of the Girdimanchay River and the slopes of the Niyal Mountain Range, the settlement of Lahij features distinct urban planning, architectural styles, and infrastructure. The town's layout includes cobbled streets, public and private structures, and historical water management systems. Its underground stone drainage networks, known locally as kurabandis, date back several centuries and represent an early example of regional sewerage engineering.

The residents of Lahij are divided into three categories, based on their craftsmanship: Baadvan, Azavarro and Araghird. Each of these categories has its own village square, mosque, hammam and graveyard. One of the most striking features of the urban look of Lahij, is the village square of each category, which, today, still has its specific role in the public life of the village. This is an ancient practice of the Zoroastrian people.

Earthquakes frequently occur in the region, and, as a result, a specific style of building construction has developed – which include certain styles and techniques in crosscutting stone and installation of wood. The ancient dwelling houses in Lahij have remained unchanged, as, during the past centuries, there have not been any significant changes in the urban planning. The ground floors of houses built in the main trading street are used as workshops and trade rooms. The traditional interiors of these Lahij houses include decorative tableware and other items, placed in different sized holes in the walls (known in Azerbaijan as takhcha, chamakhatan) and on wall shelves.

== Copper craftmanship ==
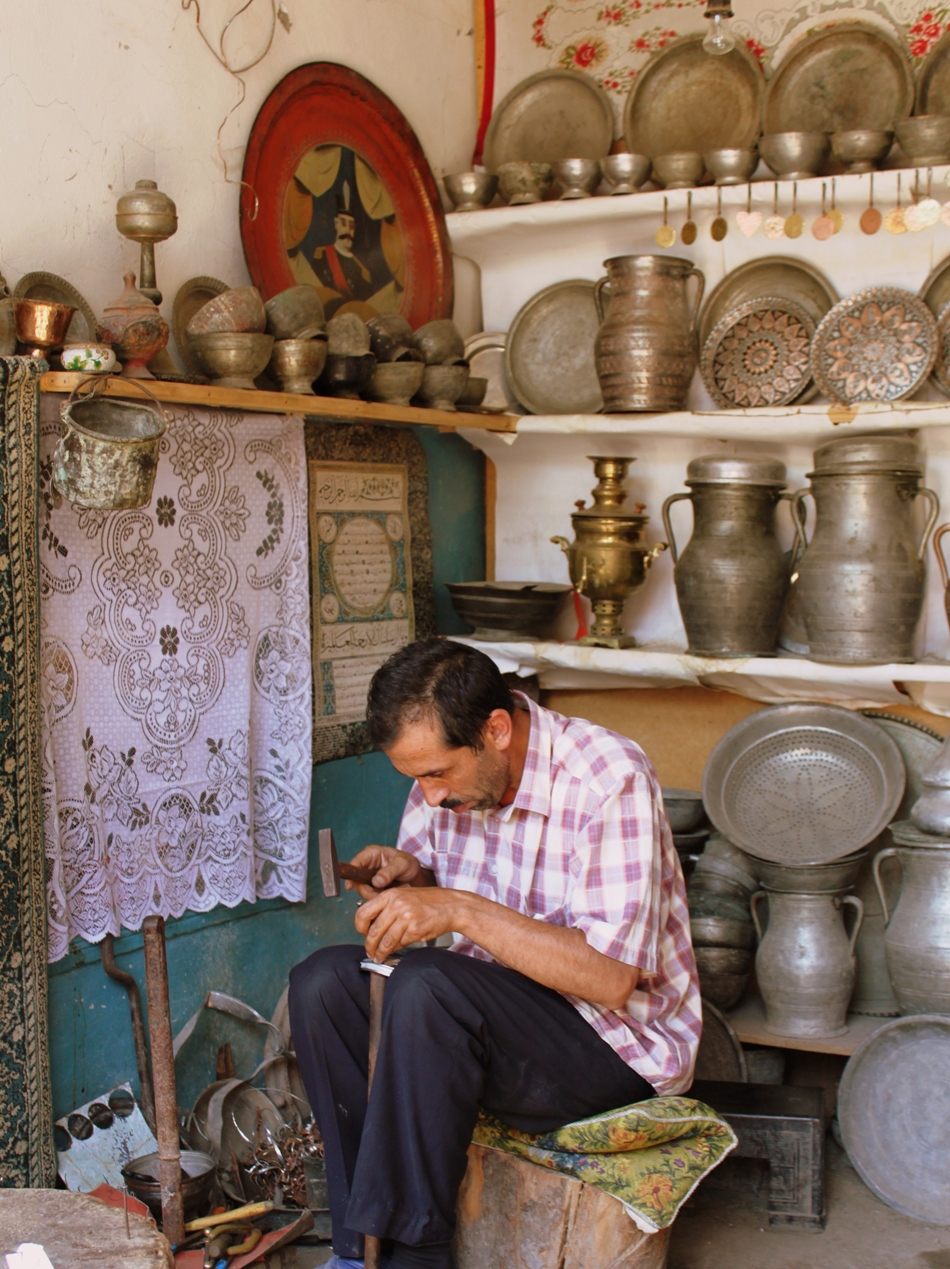
Copper craftsman at work in Lahij

Copper work is the most important of the skills developed by Lahij craftsmen. Lahij is renowned for its production of arms and copper items, decorated with carved ornaments. The development of copper production triggered the formation of such professions in Lahij as tinsmith, blacksmith and others, together with the creation of bituminous coal. The structure and supplies of copper workshops, as well as its traditional external look and its production processes remain preserved today, as they were in previous centuries. Written sources, as well as, the rich copperware collections that may be seen in the museums of Azerbaijan, Georgia, Russian and Europe, prove the existence of over 80 types of copperware equipment used in copperware manufacturing in Lahij.

Leather goods’ manufacture was the second biggest craft skill in Lahij, after that of coppersmith. The local leather goods’ master craftsmen were expert in using shagren, tumaj and yuft as raw materials for various products such as shoes, belts, leather quilted jackets, book covers and bridles. Leather production in Lahij created suitable conditions for the development of other craftsmen, with associated skills – such as saddle makers, bridle makers, cobblers, hat makers and sheepskin makers.

== Cultural heritage ==
There is a large collection of Lahij products in the Azerbaijan Museum of National History, which reflects the many different and richly made items produced by the Lahij craftsmen. Many similar items are also to be found in the Russian Museum of Ethnography (Saint-Petersburg) and the State Museum of Oriental Art (Moscow). The Louvre Museum in France also has a collection of items from Azerbaijan, which include a copper pot manufactured in Lahij. The Museum of Bern has a collection of firearms and weapons of cold steel, manufactured in Azerbaijan, which includes rifles, swords and sabres, richly decorated with ornamental patterns and inlaid work.

The major part of the cultural heritage of the Lahij represents interpretations of Islam, as well as folk rites, traditions, ceremonies, celebrations and festivals related to their pre-Islamic faith, Zoroastrianism. Included within this heritage are the intercultural and inter-religious communications that were understood by the peoples of Lahij.

More than 1000 exhibits are preserved in Lahij Museum of Local History including pottery samples dating 2000 years back, bellows made in the 18th century to use in copper smelting, and other pieces associated with animal husbandry and trade, as well as information about the underground water line installed in the 15th century. The Museum is located within a building called Aghaogly mosque which was built in 1914 and transformed into museum in 1987.

== Tourism ==
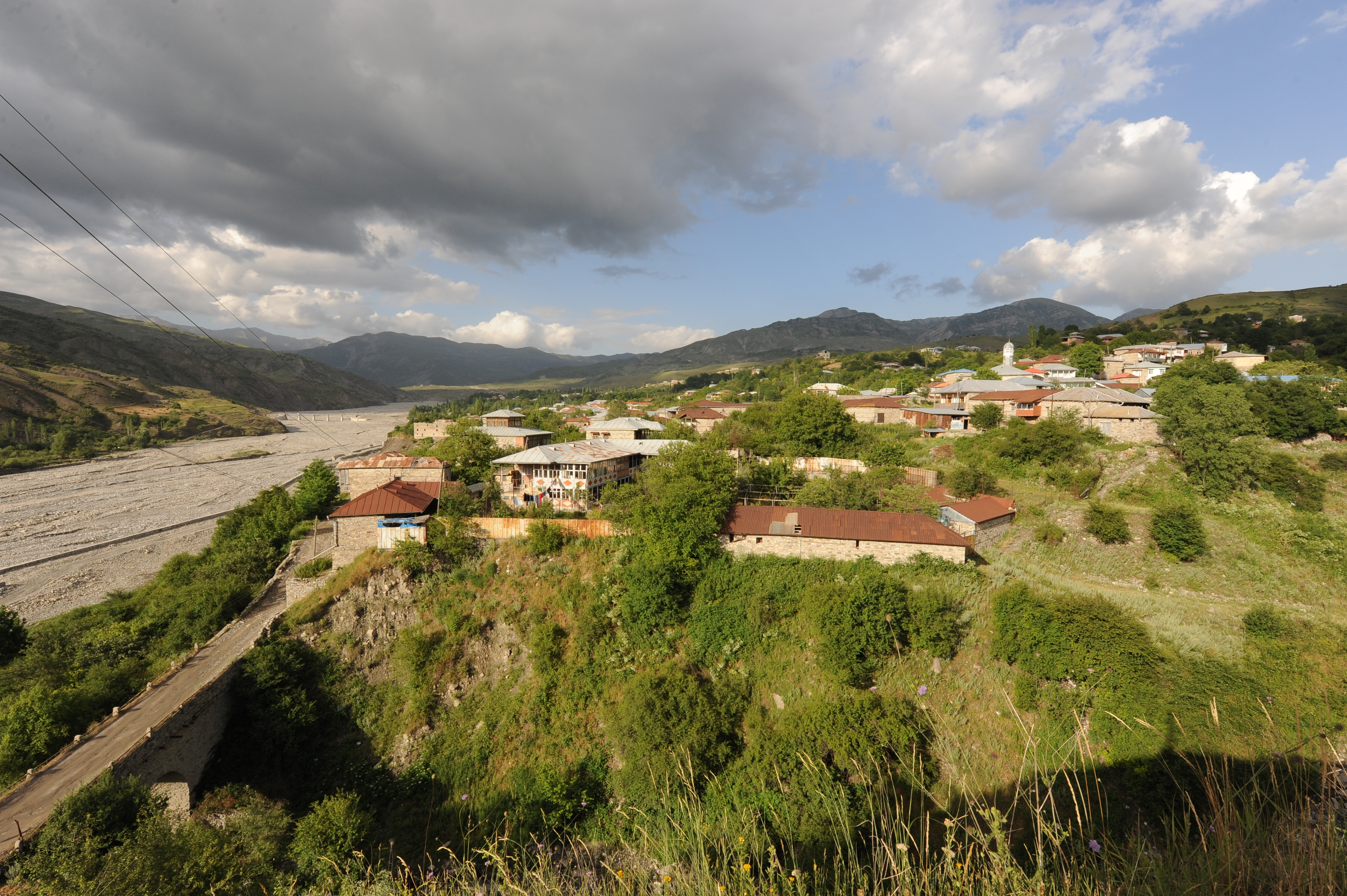

The development of international tourism, together with more knowledge about the people and cultures, has resulted in a gradual interest in the cultural diversity of the Region. Lahij, in recent years, has attracted the attention of many tourists visiting from countries worldwide and as a result Lahij is now included in the travel tours of several leading tourism agencies.

== Research ==
Lahij, due to its unique and original features, has, throughout its history, been a centre of gravity for writers, scholars, artists and filmmakers, and, today, the residents make considerable efforts to promote the Region's cultural heritage. Manaf Suleymanov, the Azerbaijani writer and journalist, who was originally from Lahij, published a book, in 1994, entitled “Lahij: Ethnographic and artistic insight”. The natural and manmade beauties of the Region are reflected in the paintings by the talented Lahij artist – Agha Mehdiyev.

The heritage of Lahij has attracted interest from Azerbaijani and foreign scholars, who have written research papers about the village.

Films about Lahij and its residents have been, and presently are, shown at international contests and film festivals. The film called Emanet ("Heritage") directed in 2006, by filmmaker Shamil Najafzade, is dedicated to the unique culture of Lahij and to the current problems faced by its people. Lahij Pace (2008) directed by Fariz Ahmadov, was included in the competition at the Irpen Film Festival, which was held in Ukraine, and also at the 39th International Rushd Film Festival of Iran. This film received a prize and diploma at the Second International Festival – Turfilm-Riga-2009 – which is dedicated to films about tourism.

Both the State of Azerbaijan and the Lahij Community make continued and considerable efforts to preserve Lahij's unique culture, applied arts and traditional system of arranging handicraft production, together with ensuring cooperation within both Lahij's community and its neighbours.

Lahij was proclaimed a historical and cultural reserve by the decision dated 23 December 1980 of the Soviet of Ministers of Azerbaijan.

In 2015, Copper craftsmanship of Lahij has been included by UNESCO into the Representative List of the Intangible Cultural Heritage of Humanity.

== Notable natives ==
- Ali Bayramov — Azerbaijani revolutionary, one of the leaders of the «Hummet»
- Manaf Suleymanov — Azerbaijani writer and scholar.
- Nadir Ibrahimov — Azerbaijani Astronomer, a crater on Mars is named in his honor.
- Shovkat Salimova — Azerbaijani ship captain

== Gallery ==
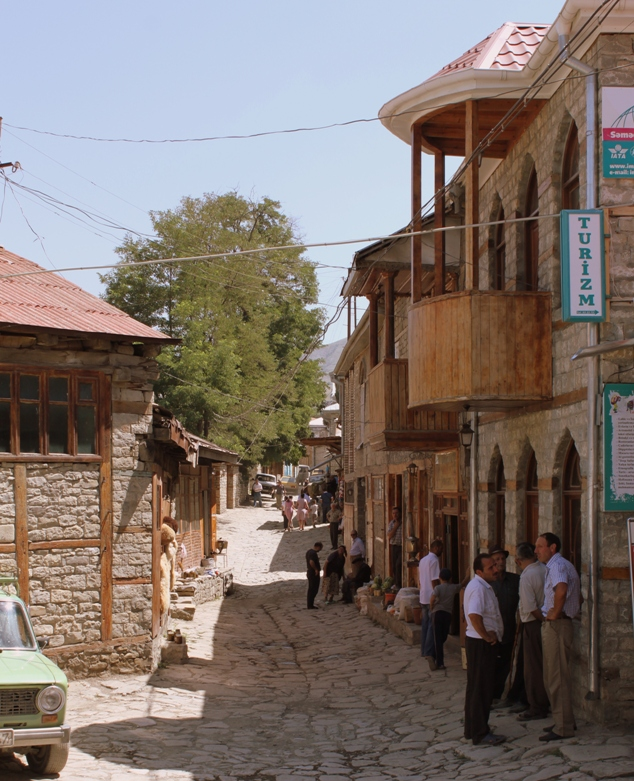

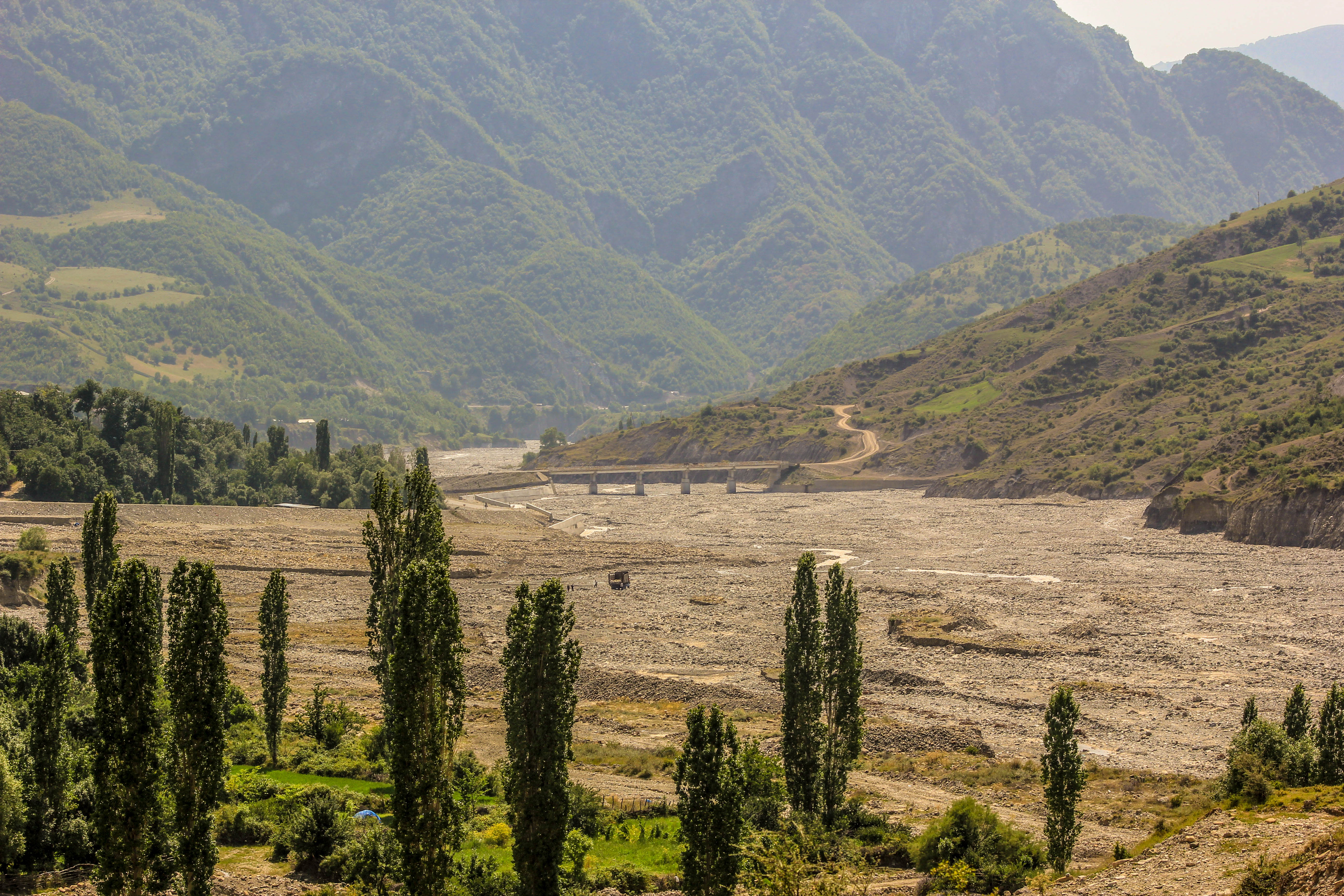

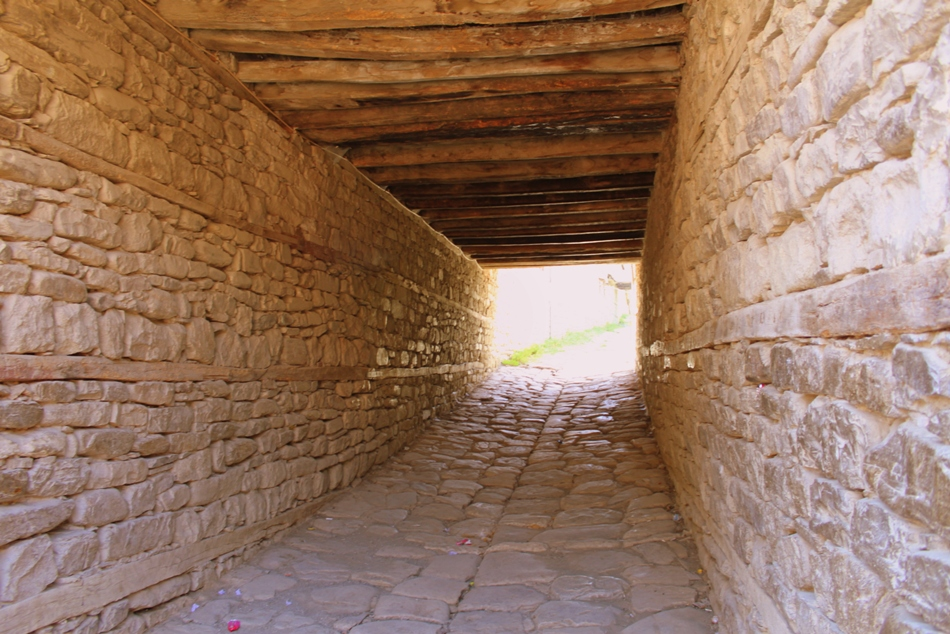

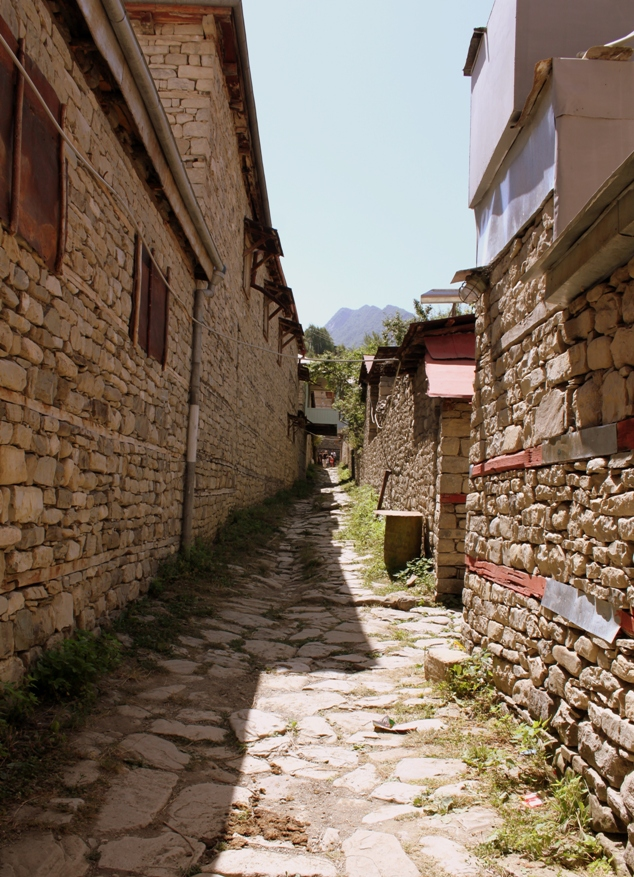

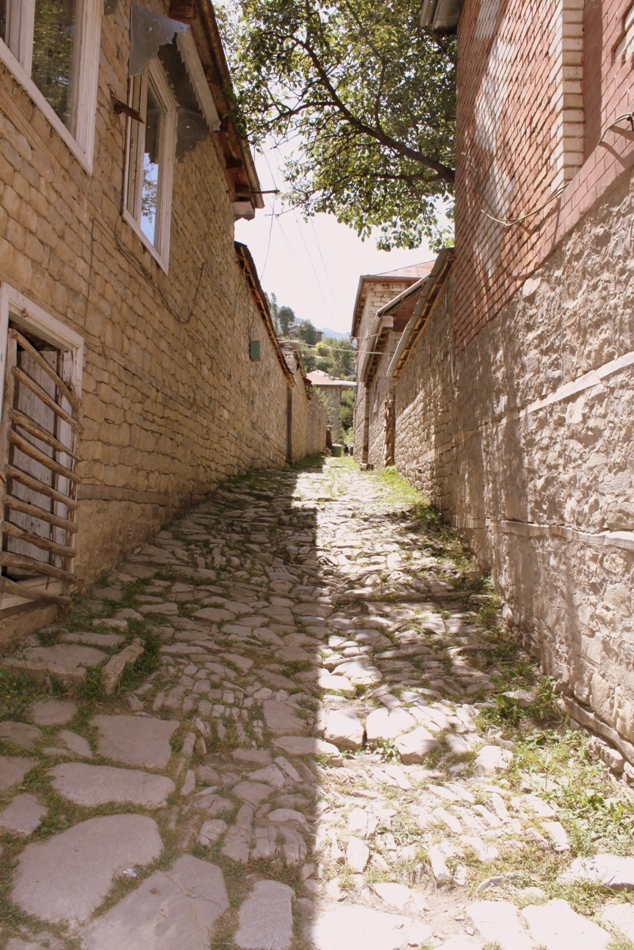

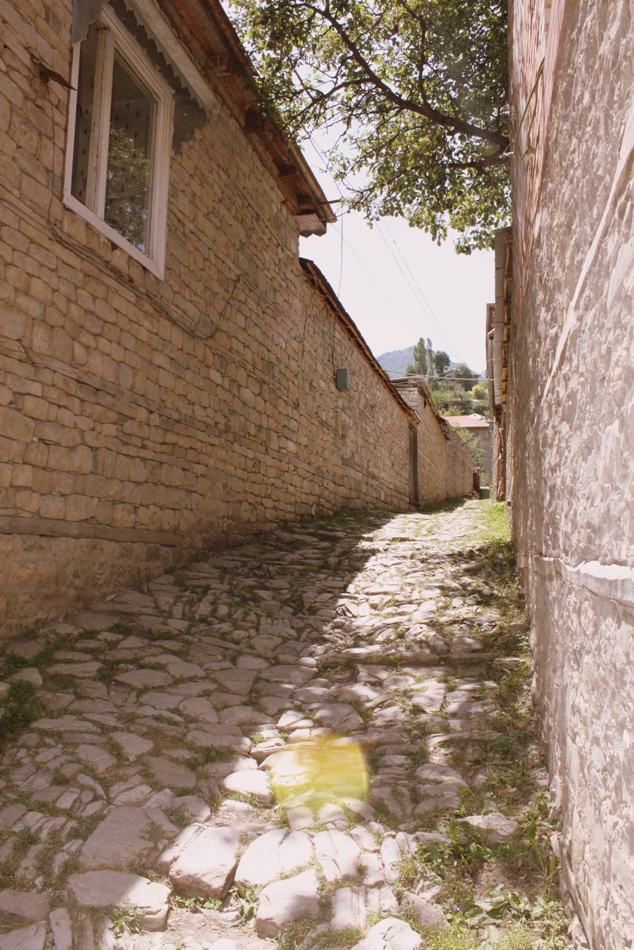

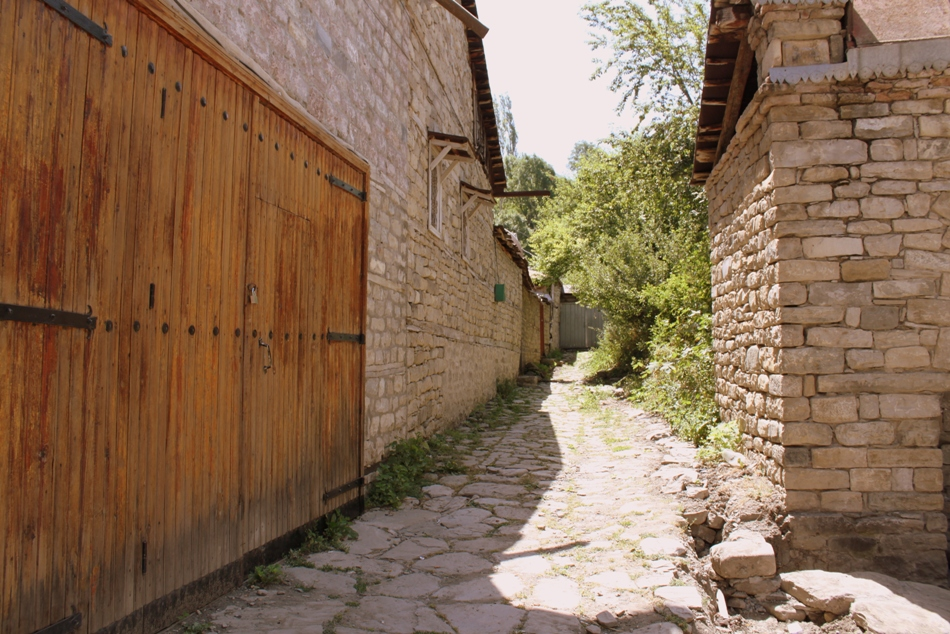

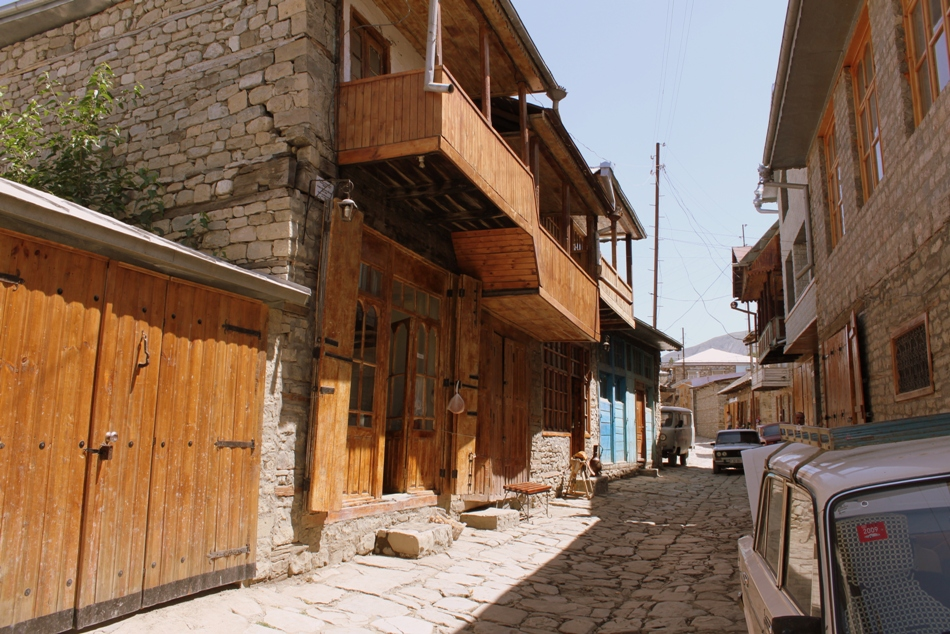

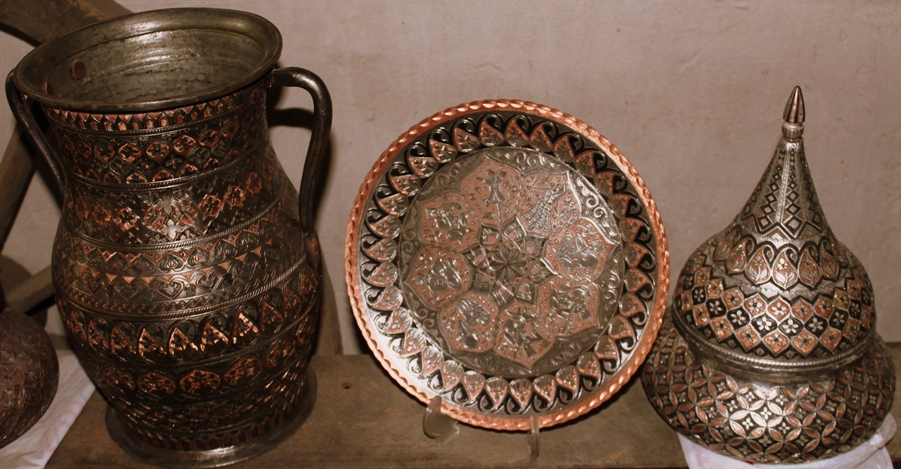

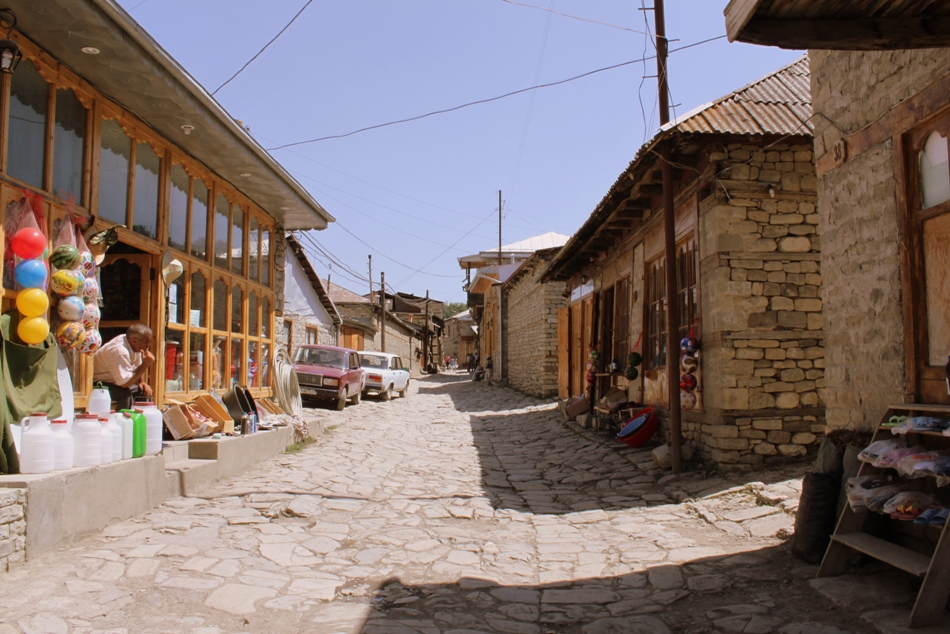

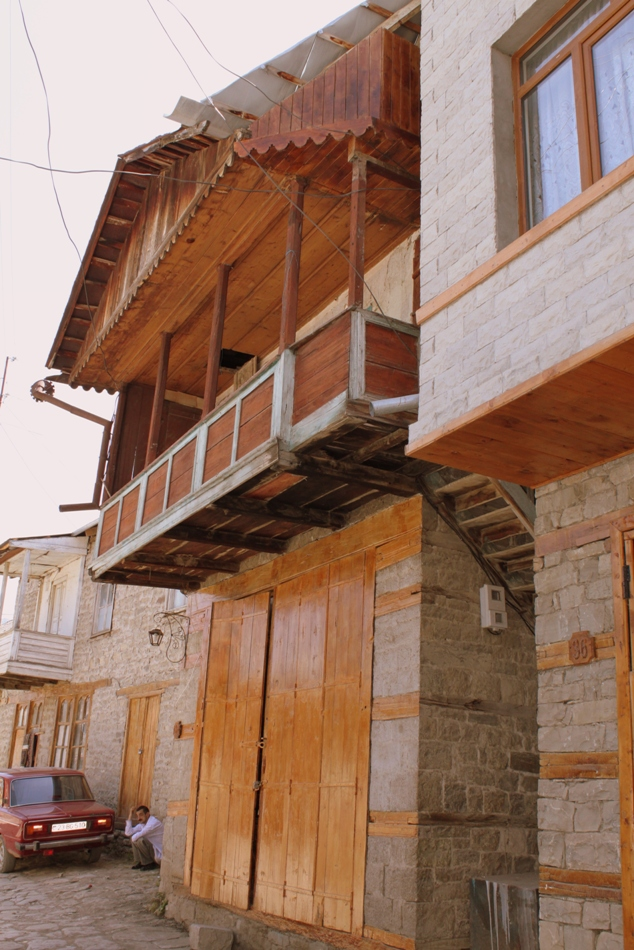

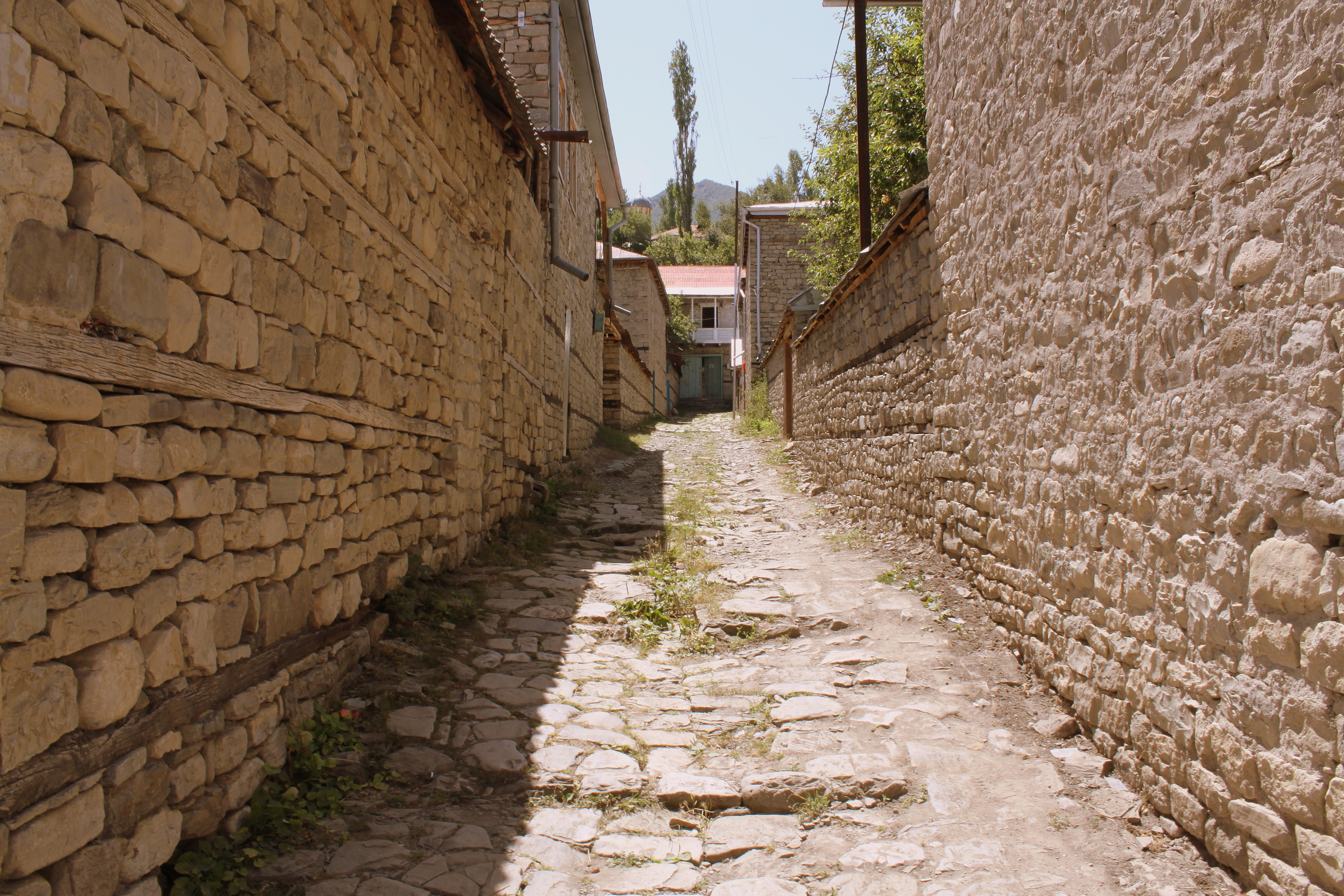

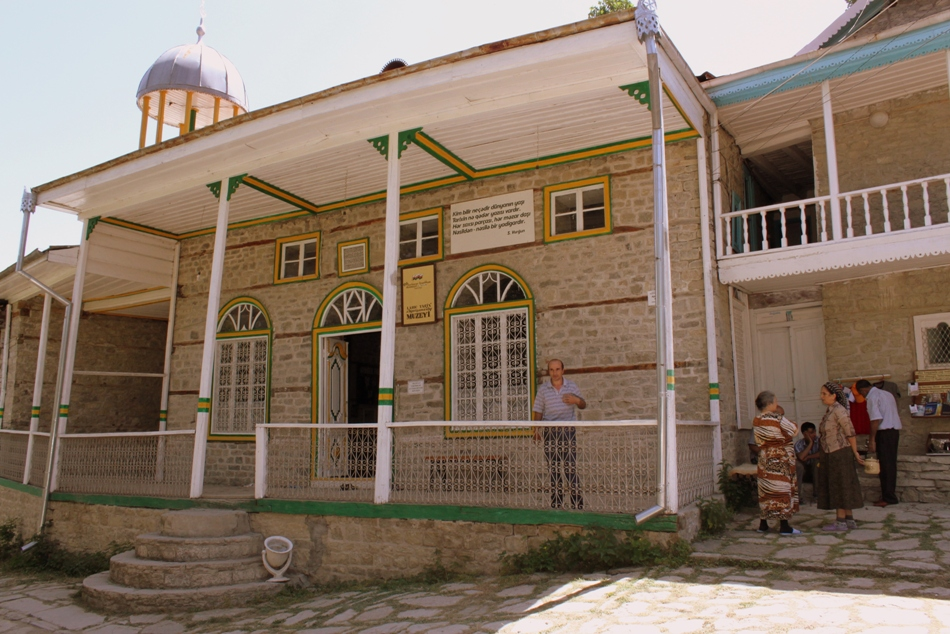

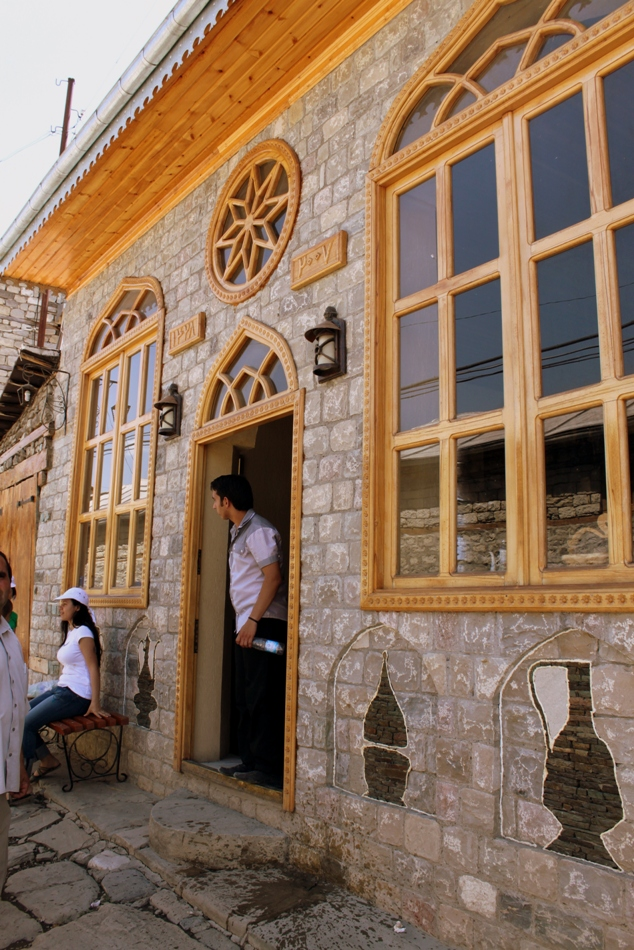

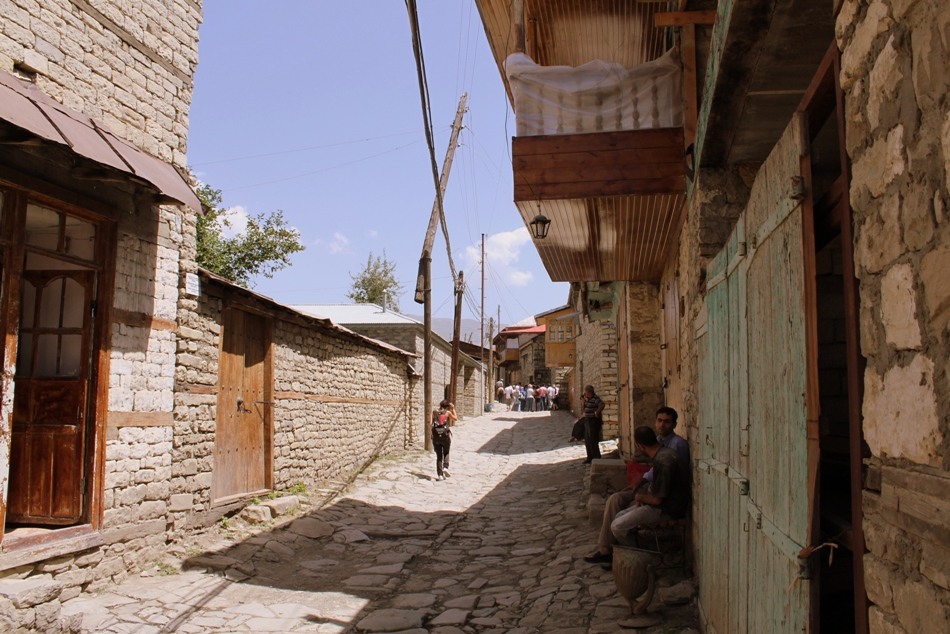

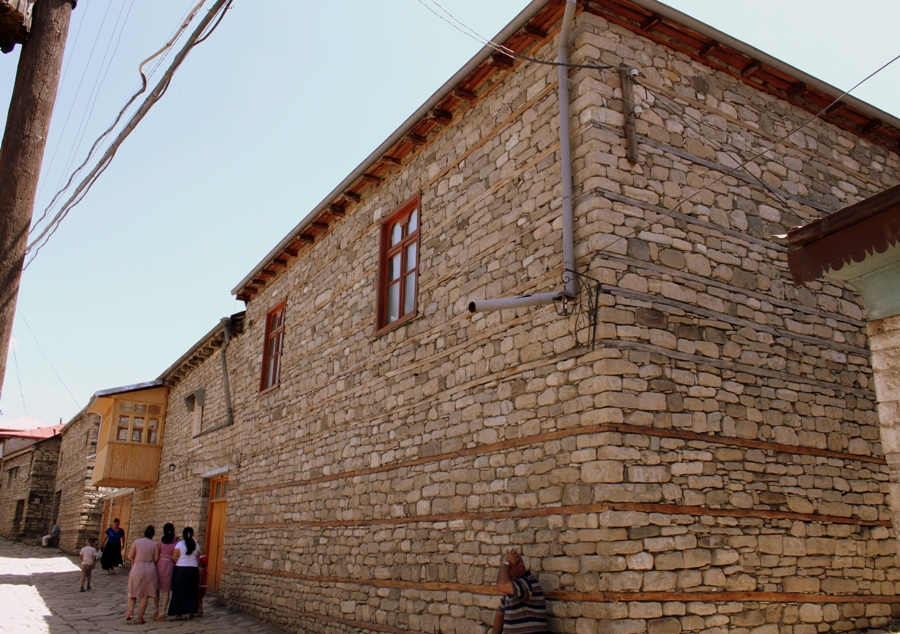

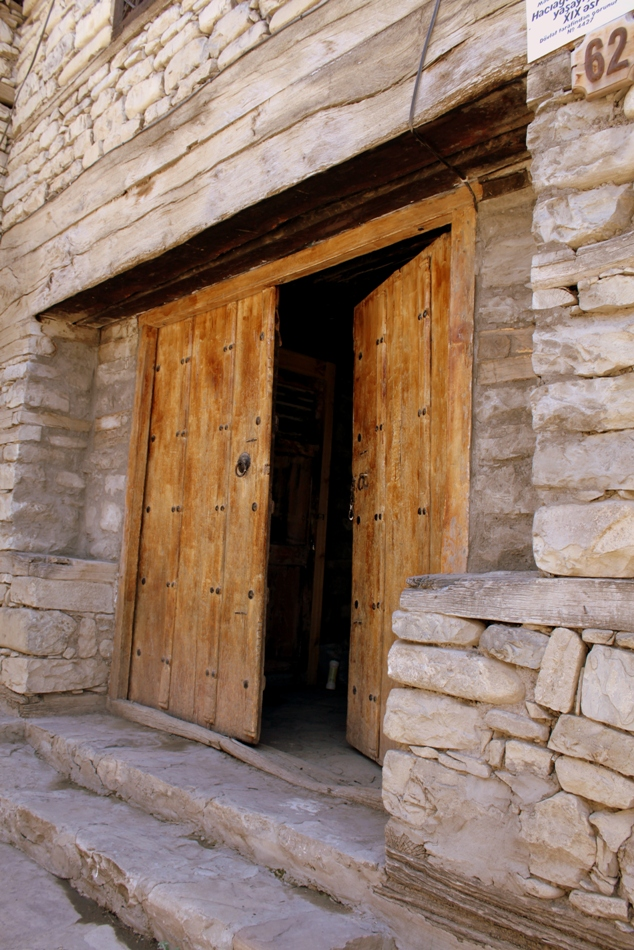

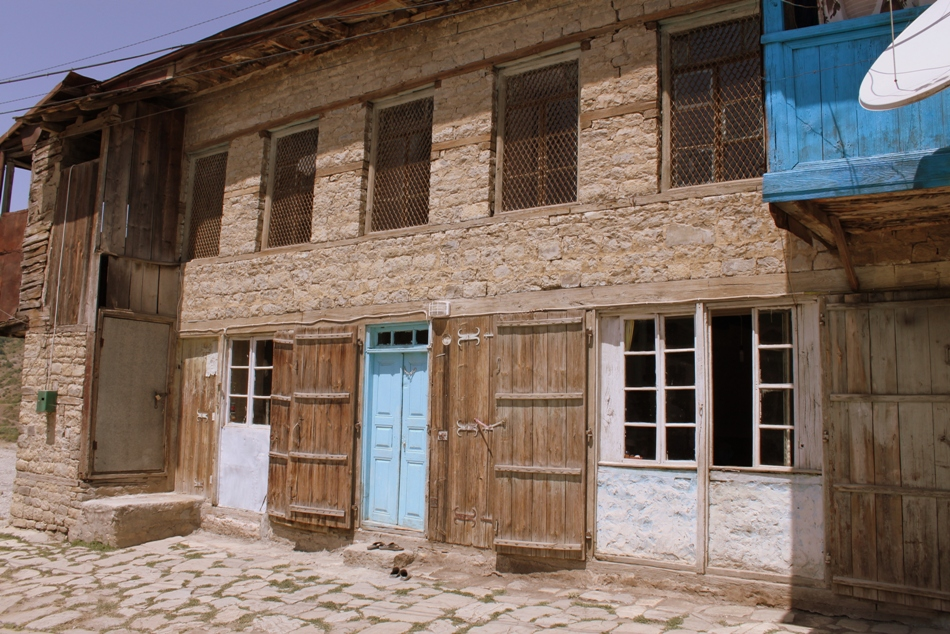

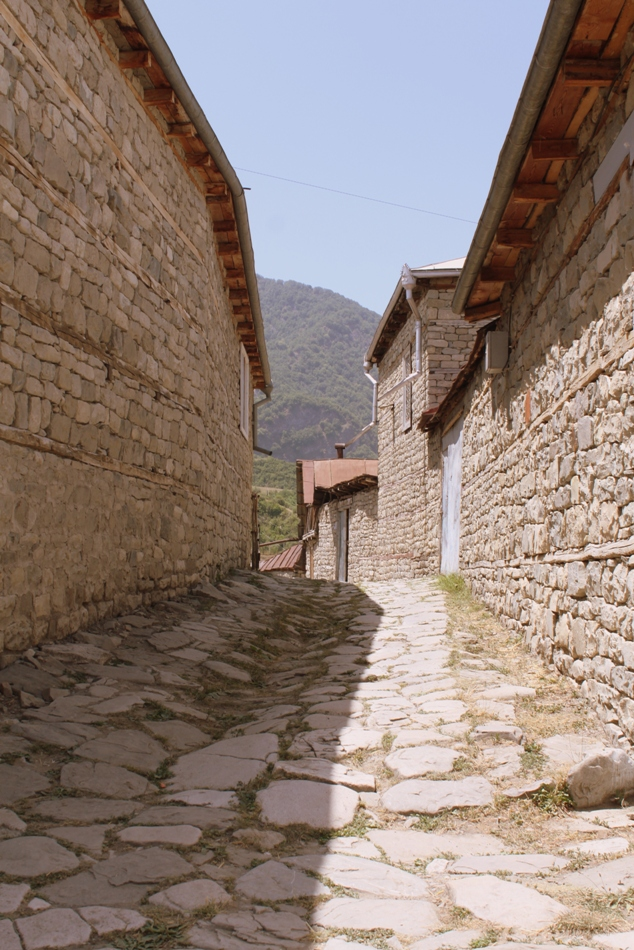

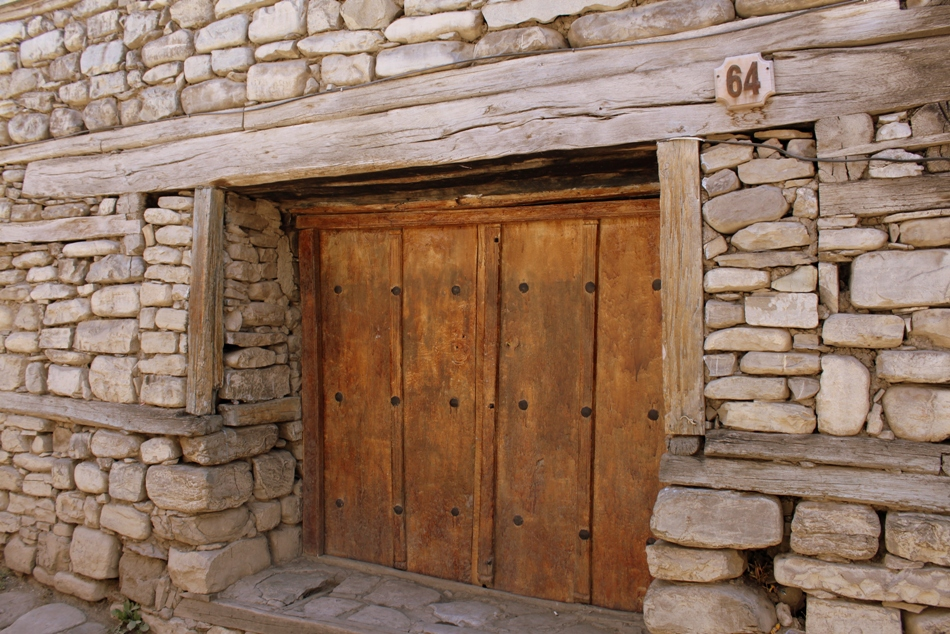

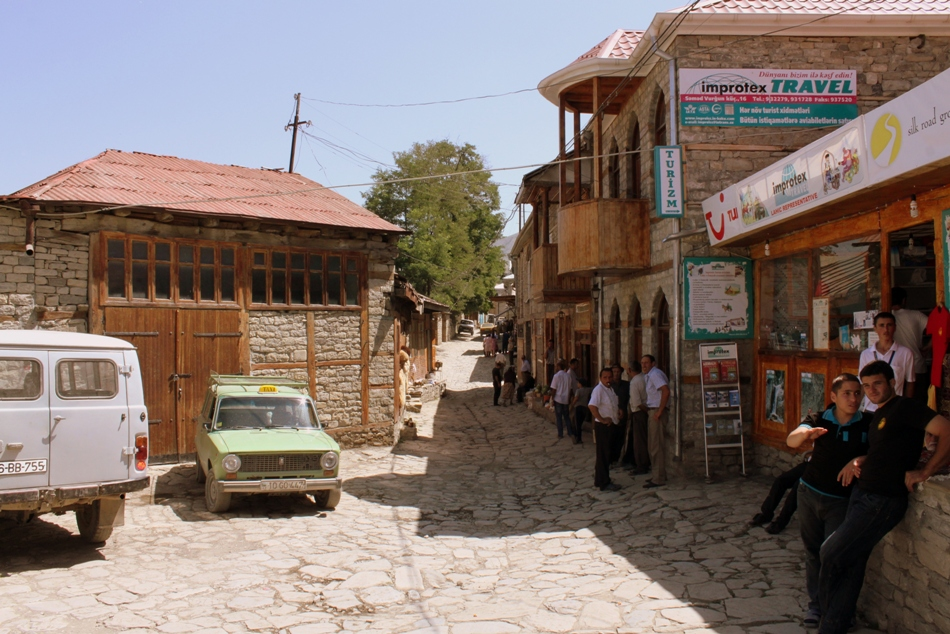

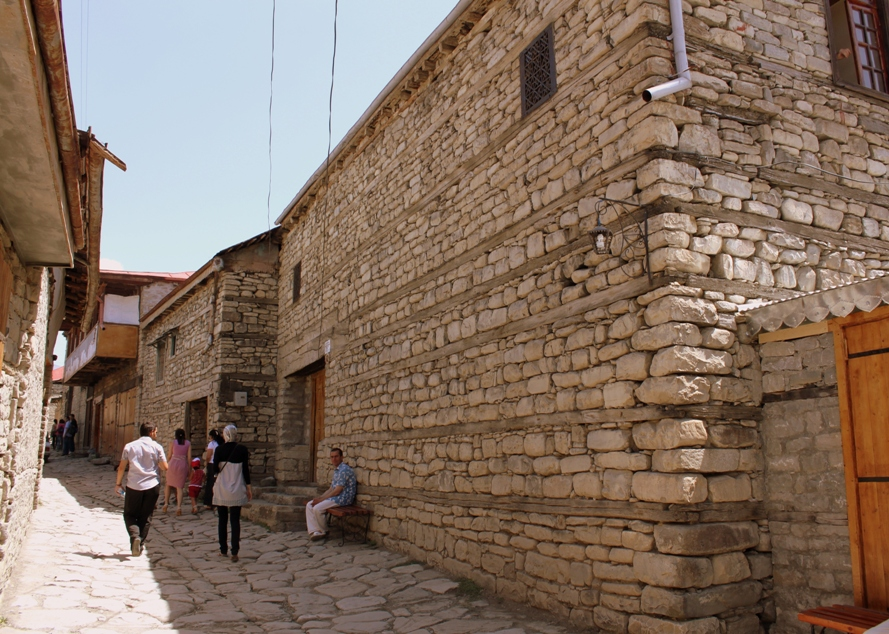

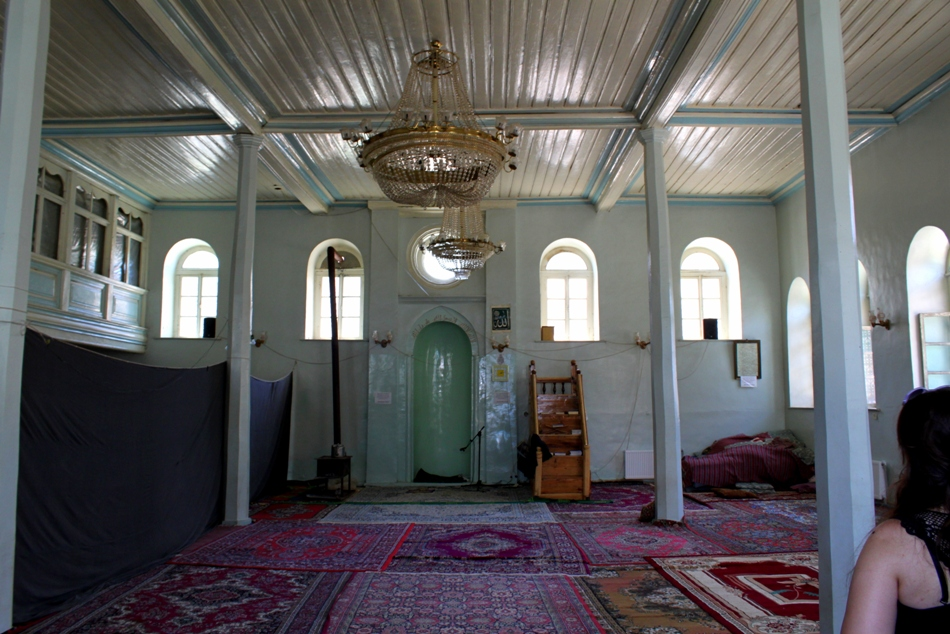
