= Tofig Mahmud =

Azerbaijani poet, writer, translator and publicist

Tofig Mahmud Tofiq Mahmud
- Born: November 6, 1931; Shahbuz District, Nakhichevan ASSR, Azerbaijan SSR, USSR
- Died: April 4, 1997 (aged 65); Baku, Azerbaijan
- Occupation: writer

Tofig Mahmud oghlu Mehdiyev (Azerbaijani: Tofiq Mahmud oğlu Mehdiyev, November 6, 1931 – April 4, 1997) was an Azerbaijani poet, writer, translator, publicist, member of the Union of Azerbaijani Writers since 1958, laureate of the Lenin Komsomol Prize of the Azerbaijan SSR (1984).

== Biography ==
Tofig Mahmud was born on November 6, 1931, in Shahbuz District of Nakhichevan ASSR. He graduated from the Faculty of Philology of Azerbaijan State University (1949–1954). He started his career as a methodologist of the methodical cabinet in the Department of Cultural and Educational Institutions of the Ministry of Culture of Azerbaijan (1954), then he became a special correspondent in the editorial office of the "Azerbaijan muallimi" newspaper (1958–1961), and a literary worker in the editorial office of the "Goyarchin" magazine (1961).

Tofig Mahmud became known in the literary world with his first book "Yola chixiram" (1959). Since 1976, he worked as an editor of "Goyarchin" magazine. He was also engaged in literary translation. His works have been translated into foreign languages. He was the chairman of the Baku branch of the Children's Fund of the Republic of Azerbaijan and a member of the advisory board (since 1989). He was elected the chairman of the children's and youth literature council of the Union of Azerbaijani Writers, a member of the children's and youth literature council of the Union of Soviet Writers.

He was awarded the Honorary Order of the Presidium of the Supreme Soviet of Azerbaijan. In 1984, he was a laureate of the Lenin Komsomol Prize of the Azerbaijan SSR.

Tofig Mahmud died on April 4, 1997, in Baku. "Tofiq Mahmud Award" (presented annually to the authors of the best children's poems) was established in the poet's name.
