= Ismayilli District =

District in northern Azerbaijan

Coordinates: 40.8531°N 48.3931°E

- District
- Map of Azerbaijan showing Ismayilli District
- Country: Azerbaijan
- Region: Mountainous Shirvan
- Established: 24 November 1931
- Capital: Ismayilli
- Settlements: 108

Government
  - Governor: Nahid Baghirov

Area
  - Total: 2,071 km^{2} (800 sq mi)

Population (2020)
  - Total: 87,400
  - Density: 42.2/km^{2} (109/sq mi)
- Time zone: UTC+4 (AZT)
- Postal code: 3100
- Website: ismayilli-ih.gov.az

Ismayilli District (Azerbaijani: İsmayıllı rayonu) is one of the 66 districts of Azerbaijan. It is located in the north of the country, in the Mountainous Shirvan Economic Region. The district borders the districts of Qabala, Quba, Goychay, Kurdamir, Agsu, and Shamakhi. Its capital and largest city is Ismayilli. As of 2020, the district had a population of 87,400. It is believed that this district was named after a highly respected elder and philanthropist in the community, Ismayil Baghiyev.

== History ==
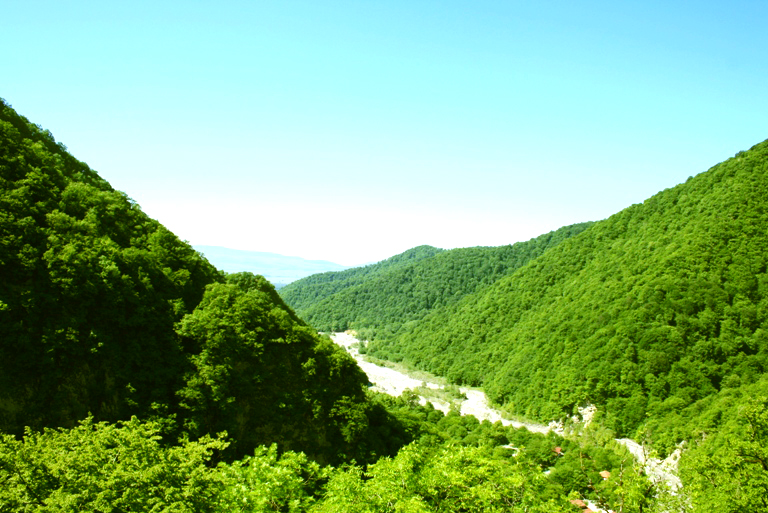
Nature in the Ismayilli District

Ismayilli district was created with the center in the Ismayilli village on November 21, 1931. Before the establishment of the district, one of its parts was in Goychay district, another one in Shamakhi district and the smallest part within Shaki district. The Ismayilli district has a number of ancient historical monuments. Significant measures are taken for the development of tourism. The Ismayilli city had been a village until 1959, a settlement until 1967, and after that, it was transformed into a city.

The territory, like all the northern lands of Azerbaijan, was part of the Caucasian Albanian state in the 4th century B.C. Mehran Gyrdyman from the dynasty of Sasanian even created his own kingdom on the territory. Albanian rulers Varaz Grigor and his son Djavanshir (616-681) were also from the dynasty of Mihranids. The Gyrdyman state was ruled by the most prominent ruler of Albania, Djavanshir, in 638–670. The ruins of the residence built by him on the Aghchay river 4 km from Talystan village are still famous as the Djavanshir tower.

A number of settlements, especially Lahydj and Basgal settlements, Ivanovka, Galadjyg, Talystan, and Diyarly villages, are notable for their ancient history and special beauty. Lahij and Basgal were declared the reserves of history and culture.

== Geography ==
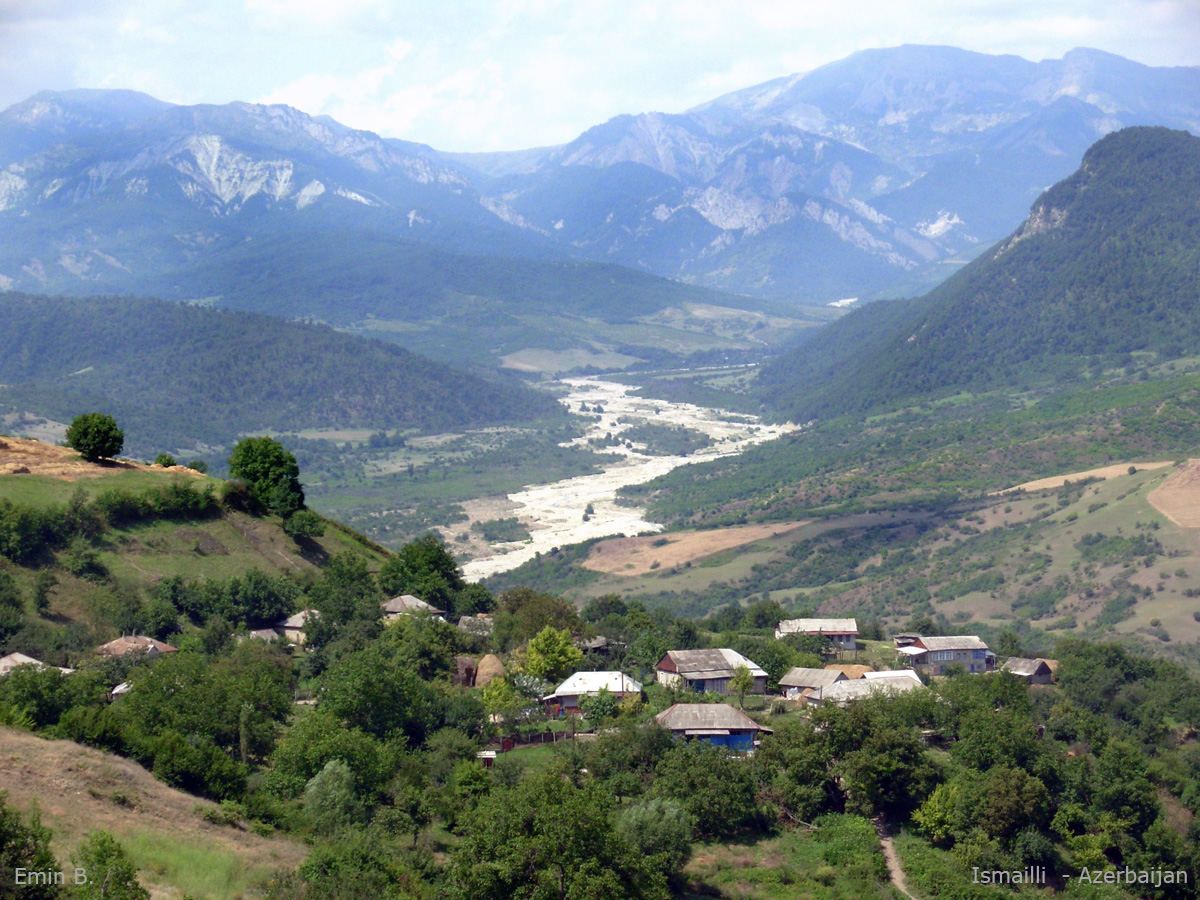
Landscape in the Ismayilli District

The district covers an area of 2074 km^{2}. It borders Quba in the north, Shamakhi in the east, Aghsu in the southeast, Kurdamir in the south, Goychay in the southwest, and Gabala in the west.

The Ismayilli district includes one city, two settlements, and 106 villages. These settlements are controlled by 34 territorial representations and 67 municipalities.

The landscape is mainly composed of mountains. Altitudes vary between 200 and 3629 meters (Babadagh) above sea level. The area is passed by the Goychay, Gyrdyman, Akhokh, Ayrichay, Sulut, and other rivers, as well as the Yekekhana and Ashygbayram artificial ponds.

The district covers 2,158.75 km^{2} with 220.58 km^{2} of winter and 135.55 km^{2} of summer pastures. The lands used in agriculture account for 966.3 km^{2} including 36.263 km^{2} of fertile land.

Woodlands account for 667.99 km^{2}. The district accounts for the State Reserve of Ismayilli. Part of the district is included in the Shahdagh National Park.

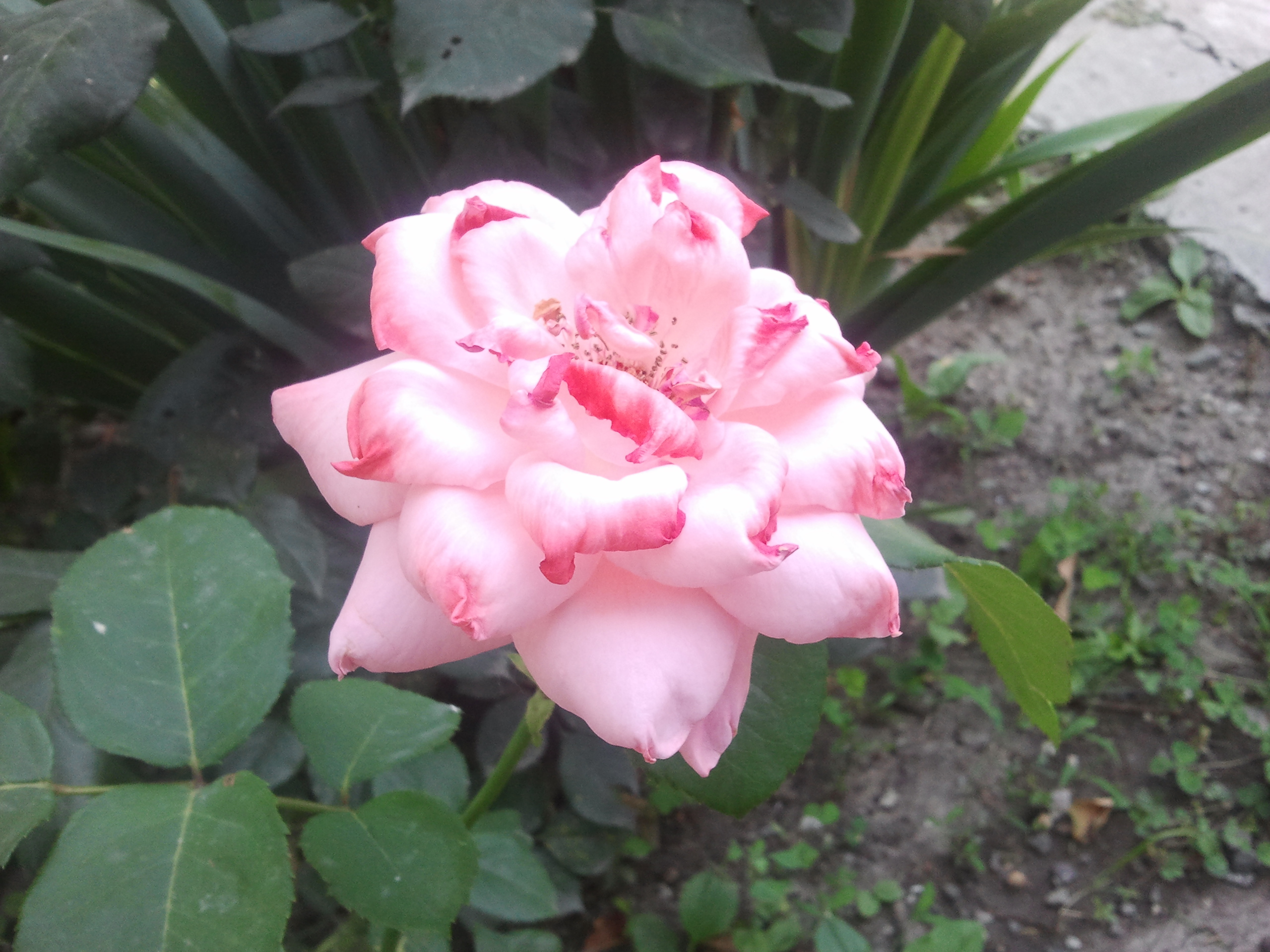
Garden rose in Ismayilli

Ismaiyilli district has a rich nature. The forests are composed of oak, hornbeam, beech, alder, birch, poplar, pear, spoke, and other trees. Such fauna as elk, mountain goat, chamois, deer, roe deer, bear, boar, lynx, fox, wolf, squirrel, coon, pheasant, partridge, eagle, falcon, tetra, and others are found in the forests.

== Demographics ==
Its population was 86,100 persons on January 1, 2018. Azerbaijanis are the overwhelming majority. Tats, Armenians, Russians and Lezgians are other ethnic groups of Ismayilli District.

Ethnic group	1939 Census		1959 Census		1970 Census		1979 Census		1999 Census		2009 Census	
Ethnic group	Population	%	Population	%	Population	%	Population	%	Population		Population	%
Azerbaijanis	30 234	57.65%	28 889	71.02%	39 171	75.92%	43 627	78.96%	61 190	84.82%	68 448	86.28%
Lezgins	3 149	6.00%	3 255	8.00%	4 883	9.46%	5 788	10.48%	7 722	10.70%	8 076	10.18%
Russians	4 460	8.50%	4 017	9.88%	3 768	7.30%	3 213	5.82%	2 514	3.49%	2 024	2.55%
Kurds	4	0.01%	...	...	1	0.01%	...	...	382	0.53%	498	0.63%
Meskhetian Turks	1	0.01%	...	...	...	...	...	...	244	0.34%	194	0.25%
Ukrainians	157	0.30%	...	...	58	0.11%	...	...	25	0.03%	9	0.01%
Tatars	21	0.04%	...	...	25	0.05%	8	0.01%	22	0.03%	7	0.01%
Jews	300	0.57%	46	0.11%	15	0.03%	155	0.28%	15	0.02%	7	0.01%
Mountain Jews	300	0.57%	46	0.11%	217	0.42%	155	0.28%	15	0.02%	7	0.01%
Armenians	6 683	12.74%	4 038	9.93%	3 308	6.41%	2 377	4.30%	5	0.01%	...	...
Avars	4	0.01%	...	...	4	0.01%	8	0.01%	...	...	...	...
Georgians	9	0.02%	6	0.01%	13	0.02%	7	0.01%	...	...	...	...
Udi people	7 250	13.82%	...	...	...	...	2	0.01%	...	...	...	...
Tat people	7 250	13.82%	...	...	40	0.08%	...	...	...	...	...	...
Germans	46	0.09%	...	...	...	...	...	...	...	...	...	...
Talysh people	37	0.07%	...	...	...	...	...	...	...	...	...	...
Others	90	0.17%	428	1.05%	93	0.18%	64	0.12%	25	0.03%	67	0.08%
Total	52 445	100%	40 679	100%	51 596	100%	55 249	100%	72 144	100%	79 330	100%

=== Population ===
According to the annual report of the State Statistics Committee, the total population in 2000 was 73,000. In 2018, this indicator increased by 13,100 people.

The population of district at the beginning of the year, thsd. persons
	2000	2001	2002	2003	2004	2005	2006	2007	2008	2009	2010	2011	2012	2013	2014	2015	2016	2017	2018	2019	2020	2021
Ismayilli region	73,0	73,6	74,2	74,9	75,6	76,4	77,1	77,8	78,6	79,2	80,0	80,9	81,7	82,4	83,1	84,0	84,9	85,5	86,1	86,7	87,4	87,9
urban population	15,4	15,6	15,8	16,0	16,3	16,5	16,7	16,9	17,1	17,3	17,4	17,6	17,7	26,7	26,9	27,2	27,6	27,8	27,9	28,1	28,4	28,6
rural population	57,6	58,0	58,4	58,9	59,3	59,9	60,4	60,9	61,5	61,9	62,6	63,3	64,0	55,7	56,2	56,8	57,3	57,7	58,2	58,6	59,0	59,3

=== Language ===
- Azerbaijani
- Tati
- Lezgian
- Russian

== Media ==
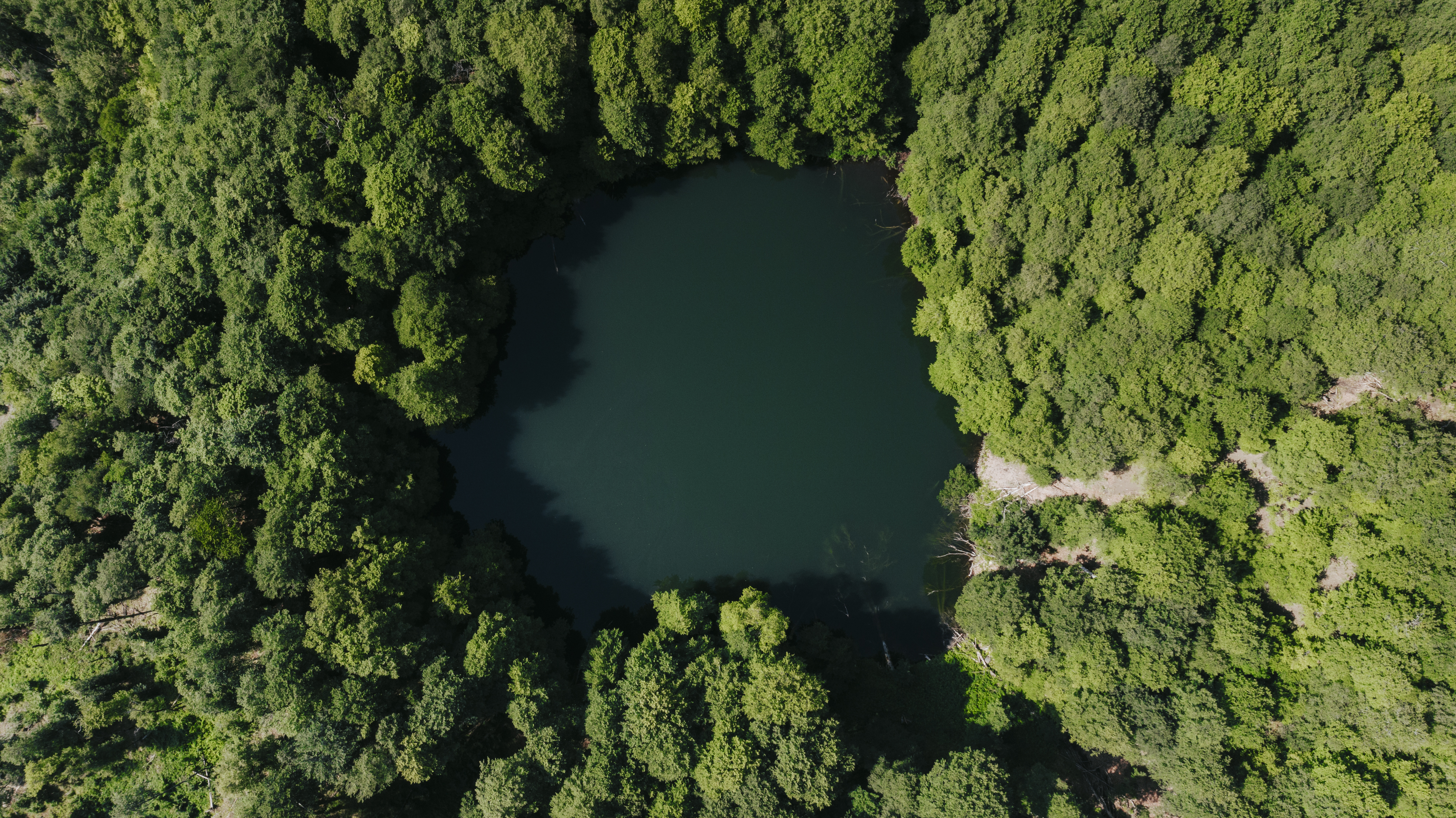
Garanohur lake

The sociopolitical newspaper Girdyman was established in 2002 and is issued twice or thrice a month in 500 editions. It was founded by the executive body of the district and the creative collective of the publishing house. It was registered by the Ministry of Justice of the Republic of Azerbaijan with registration number 120.

The publication of a local newspaper commenced in 1934. It was called Yeni Ismayilly from 1934 to 1966, Zehmetkesh from 1966 to 1991, and Djavanshir yurdu from 1991.

The radio station of the district was registered in the head department for media under the State Press Committee and started operating on February 10, 1993. It aims to provide the residents of Ismayilly with daily sociopolitical news, entertaining programs and programs for children, ads, announcements, and other programs. It transmits its programs thirty minutes a day except for Saturday and Sunday.

Furthermore, it is the executive body of the district. It has previously operated as a ten-minute news bulletin in a local newspaper.
