= Muhammad II of Shirvan =

Muhammad II
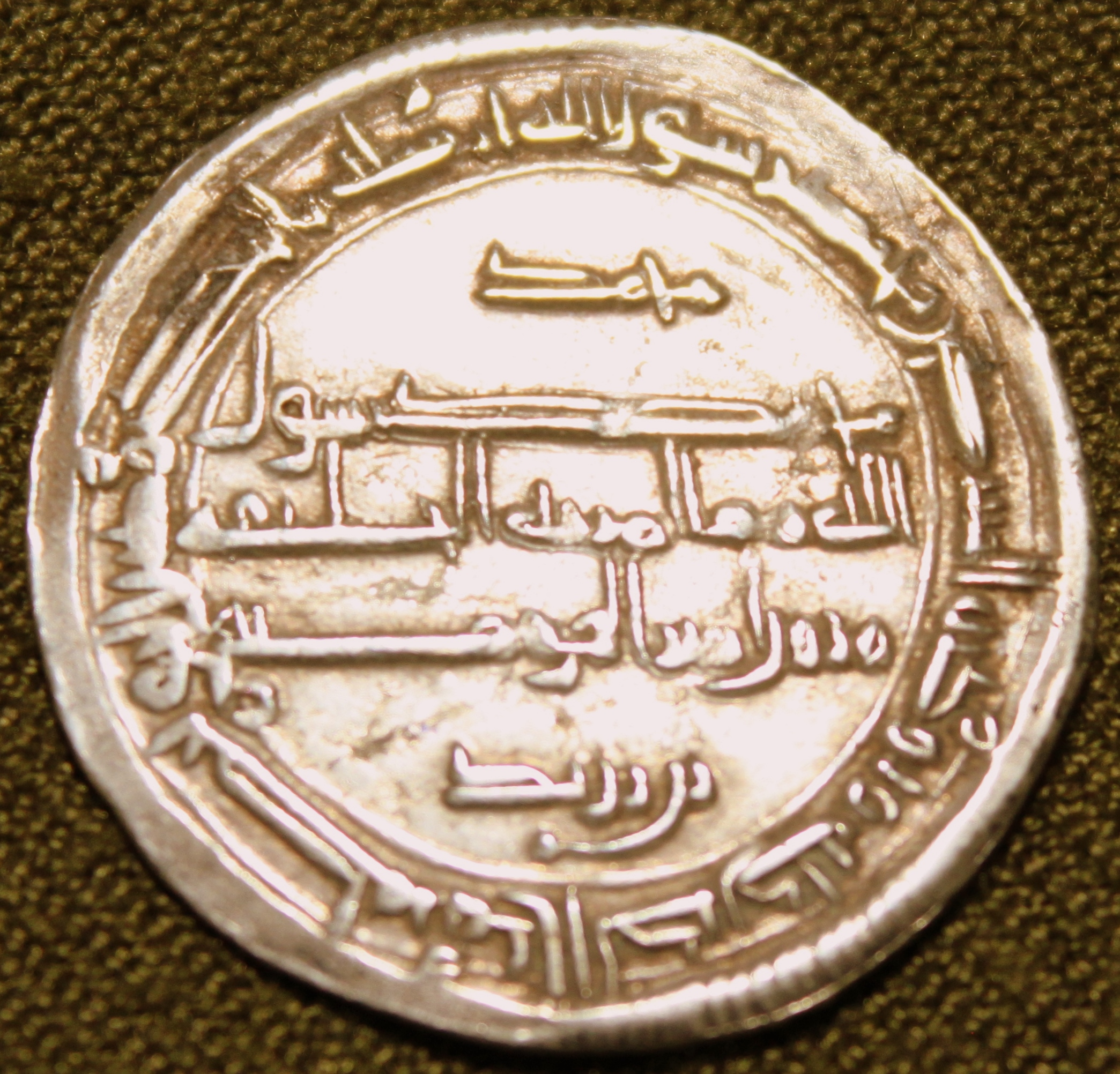
- Coin minted in the name of Muhammad ibn Yazid

Layzanshah
- Reign: 918 – 948
- Predecessor: Abu Tahir Yazid
- Successor: Ahmad

Ruler of Tabasaran
- Reign: before 917

Shirvanshah
- Reign: September 948 – 4 June 956
- Predecessor: Abu Tahir Yazid
- Successor: Ahmad
- Died: 4 June 956
- Issue: Ahmad; Haytham
- House: Yazidids
- Father: Abu Tahir Yazid
- Religion: Sunni Islam

Muhammad ibn Yazid (Arabic: محمد بن يزيد; died 4 June 956), known as Muhammad II, was the Layzanshah from 918 and the Shirvanshah from 948 until his death. He was a son of Abu Tahir Yazid, who had united Shirvan and Layzan in 917 and granted Layzan to him as a fief.

He is sometimes numbered Muhammad III through confusion with his grandfather Muhammad ibn Yazid, who bore the same name and patronymic but ruled only in Layzan. Vladimir Minorsky identified this similarity of names as the source of a long-standing confusion in the sources, including in al-Mas'udi, who names a reigning Shirvanshah Muhammad ibn Yazid at a date when Abu Tahir was on the throne.

== Background ==
Abu Tahir Yazid seized Shirvan in 917 and in 918 founded the town of Yazidiya, later Shamakhi, granting Layzan as a fief to Muhammad, one of his two sons. Muhammad had earlier ruled Tabasaran in the time of his grandfather Muhammad ibn Yazid, of whom very little is known. Tabasaran was afterwards held by his uncle Haytham ibn Muhammad ibn Yazid. In October 930, while governing Layzan, he fought a battle at the gate of Shabaran against the emir of Derbent Abd al-Malik ibn Hashim, which ended without a decisive result and was followed by peace.

== Reign ==
Muhammad succeeded his father in September 948. He arrested his brother Ahmad ibn Yazid and put him in prison, appointed one of his own sons, Ahmad, to Layzan, and set his other son Haytham over Tabasaran, which he had himself governed a generation or more earlier in his grandfather's day. For eight years, the chronicle says, he carried on the tradition of his ancestors in raiding the non-Muslims.

Al-Mas'udi, who completed his work in 332 AH (943/944 CE), reports that the ruler of Shirvan was Muhammad ibn Yazid, and that after the death of his son-in-law he had seized Khursan, Vardan and Derbent and joined them to Shirvan and Layzan, so that his realm extended a month's journey. Since Muhammad only came to the throne in 948, Minorsky held that either he was associated in power during his father's lifetime, or the name in al-Mas'udi's text is a later interpolation. He emended the son-in-law's name, printed as "Abdullah ibn Hisham" to Abd al-Malik ibn Hashim, the emir of Derbent who died in 327 AH (938/939 CE), and took the Shirvanshah of the passage to be Abu Tahir Yazid rather than his son. On that reading the emir was married to a daughter of Abu Tahir and was Muhammad's brother-in-law, and the battle the two fought at Shabaran in 930 was between kinsmen by marriage.

Ibn Hawqal preserves a list of the principalities tributary to the Musafirid Marzuban ibn Muhammad in 344 AH (955/956 CE), in which the contribution of "Muhammad ibn Ahmad al-Azdi, lord and king of Shirvan" is assessed at one million dirhams; by far the largest sum in the list. Minorsky considered al-Azdi an auditory error for al-Yazidi, and observed that in Marzuban's time only Muhammad ibn Abu Tahir Yazid fits, unless Ibn Hawqal, finishing his work about 988, substituted the name of his own contemporary Muhammad ibn Ahmad. He connected the list with Marzuban's presence near Derbent in that same year.

== Death ==
Muhammad died on 4 June 956, of smallpox. It was also said that he was poisoned by his vizier Ibn al-Maraghi. While the shah lay dying of smallpox the vizier hankered after royal power, and sent two of Muhammad's slaves to the prison where his brother Ahmad ibn Yazid was held with orders to murder him; they strangled him and concealed the body. After some days Muhammad recovered, and in thanksgiving to God for his recovery he ordered Ibn al-Maraghi to release his brother. Fearing for his life, the vizier gave him a poisoned potion which killed him — as he had previously done, according to the chronicle, with Muhammad's father.

He was succeeded by his son Ahmad, until then ruler of Layzan, who had come to visit his father on his sickbed. Ibn al-Maraghi attempted to poison the new shah in turn, sending him medicine when he fell ill; Ahmad's mother, entering the room with a foreboding, stopped him from drinking it, smeared some on a piece of bread and threw it to a cat, which died at once. On recovering, Ahmad sent his ghulams into the vizier's house, where they beat him to death with staves and cudgels.

== Family ==
Muhammad's brothers were Ahmad ibn Yazid, whom he imprisoned and who was strangled in prison in 956, and Abu'l-Badr ibn Yazid, who died in the same year. The strangled brother left a son, Abu'l-Haytham ibn Ahmad, who fled to Barda after Muhammad's death, died there and was buried at Kurdiyan (modern Kurdivan). Muhammad's own sons were Ahmad, who succeeded him, and Haytham, who fled to the country of the Lakz in fear of his brother once the latter's position was secure.

Al-Mas'udi states that the Shirvanshah of his day was descended from the Sasanian king Bahram Gur, a claim C. E. Bosworth cited as evidence of the early Persianization of the dynasty.

== Sources ==
- Ashurbeyli, Sara (2007). Şirvanşahlar dövləti [The State of the Shirvanshahs] (in Azerbaijani) (4th ed.). Baku.
- Bosworth, C. E. (1973). "The Heritage of Rulership in Early Islamic Iran and the Search for Dynastic Connections with the Past". Iran. 11: 51–62. doi:10.2307/4300484. JSTOR 4300484.
- Madelung, Wilferd (1975). "The minor dynasties of northern Iran". In Frye, R. N. (ed.). The Cambridge History of Iran, Volume 4: From the Arab Invasion to the Saljuqs. Cambridge: Cambridge University Press. pp. 198–249.
- Minorsky, Vladimir (1958). A History of Sharvān and Darband in the 10th-11th Centuries. Cambridge: W. Heffer & Sons.

Preceded by Abu Tahir Yazid	Layzanshah; 918–948	Succeeded by Ahmad
Preceded by Abu Tahir Yazid	Shirvanshah; 948–956	Succeeded by Ahmad
