= Ahmad of Shirvan =

Ahmad ibn Muhammad

Shirvanshah
- Reign: 4 June 956 – June 981
- Predecessor: Muhammad II
- Successor: Muhammad III

Layzanshah
- Reign: September 948 – 4 June 956
- Predecessor: Muhammad II
- Died: June 981
- Issue: Muhammad III; Yazid II; Haytham
- House: Yazidids
- Father: Muhammad II
- Religion: Islam

Ahmad ibn Muhammad (Arabic: أحمد بن محمد; died June 981) was the Shirvanshah from 956 until his death, ruling for about twenty-five years. A son of Muhammad ibn Yazid, he governed Layzan during his father's reign and succeeded him after the vizier Ibn al-Maraghi poisoned him; the same vizier attempted to poison Ahmad in turn and was beaten to death on his orders.

== Reign ==
Ahmad was appointed to Layzan in September 948, when his father succeeded Abu Tahir Yazid as Shirvanshah; his brother Haytham was set over Tabasaran at the same time.

Muhammad II died of smallpox on 4 June 956, or, as the chronicle also reports, of poison administered by his vizier Ibn al-Maraghi. Ahmad had come to visit his father on his sickbed, and on his death became his successor, the nobles of the kingdom swearing allegiance to him.

Soon afterwards Ahmad fell ill, and Ibn al-Maraghi sent him a medicine into which he had mixed poison. Ahmad was about to swallow it when his mother came in and, having some foreboding, prevented him; she took the medicine, smeared some of it on a piece of bread and threw it to a cat, which ate it and died instantly. When Ahmad recovered he sent his ghulams, who entered the vizier's house unnoticed and beat him to death with staves and cudgels.

With the vizier disposed of and his power secure, Ahmad's brother Haytham, the ruler of Tabasaran, took fright and fled to the country of the Lakz; he too had come to their father's sickbed. Their cousin Abu'l-Haytham ibn Ahmad — son of the uncle whom Muhammad II had imprisoned and who was strangled in prison — fled to Barda, where he lived for a time before dying; his body was taken to Kurdiyan for burial. In the same year Ahmad's uncle Abu'l-Badr ibn Yazid also died, leaving Ahmad in undisputed authority.

In 357 AH (967/968 CE) Haytham left the country of the Lakz and took refuge with Ibrahim ibn Marzuban al-Daylami. The two entered Shirvan together, and the sallar raided and plundered it, as he did the countryside of Derbent as well. Ahmad made peace with him and gave him money, and the sallar left Shirvan, intending to take Haytham with him; but Haytham escaped to Masqat and took asylum with Ahmad ibn Abd al-Malik al-Hashimi, the emir of Derbent, who received him honourably and treated him well.

The emir negotiated on Haytham's behalf with the Shirvanshah, asking him to bestow a part of Shirvan on the fugitive. Ahmad refused and answered with threats. The emir thereupon gathered an army from the outlying districts, chiefly from Sarir, marched on Shirvan, stormed Shabaran and raided and burnt it, carrying off countless spoils from the town and its neighbourhood. On the way back the Saririans entered Derbent a day ahead of the emir; disturbances broke out in the town, a hundred of the Sarir chiefs were killed and all the plunder taken from Shirvan was seized from them.

Ibn Hawqal reports that after the Rus destruction of Samandar and the Khazar lands in the 960s, refugees from Khazaria found shelter on the Absheron and Mangyshlak peninsulas, and that some of them began to return to the Khazar capitals of Itil and Khazaran with the help of the Shirvanshah, who supported them with his troops and his men. Ibn Hawqal names the Shirvanshah as Muhammad ibn Ahmad al-Azdi; Minorsky considered al-Azdi an auditory error for al-Yazidi, and noted that Ibn Hawqal, who completed his work about 988, may have substituted the name of his own contemporary Muhammad ibn Ahmad for that of the ruler actually reigning at the time described.

== Death and family ==
Ahmad died in June 981, after a reign of some twenty-five years. He was succeeded by his son Muhammad III, and after him by another son, Yazid. A third son, Haytham ibn Ahmad, died in 416 AH (1025/1026 CE) on the "Estate of Muhammad" in Tabasaran, a hereditary holding of the family.

== Sources ==
- Minorsky, Vladimir (1958). A History of Sharvān and Darband in the 10th-11th Centuries. Cambridge: W. Heffer & Sons.

Preceded by Muhammad II	Ruler of Layzan; 948–956	Succeeded by unknown
Preceded by Muhammad II	Shirvanshah; 956–981	Succeeded by Muhammad III
