= Maymun I of Derbent =

Emir of Derbent from 976 to 997 with interruptions

Maymun I

Emir of Derbent
- Reign: November 976 – 990
- Predecessor: Ahmad of Derbent
- Successor: Muhammad III of Shirvan

Emir of Derbent
- Reign: 990 – 991
- Predecessor: Muhammad III of Shirvan
- Successor: Muhammad III of Shirvan

Emir of Derbent
- Reign: 992 – 27 February 997
- Predecessor: Muhammad III of Shirvan
- Successor: Muhammad II of Derbent
- Born: 959
- Died: February 27, 997 (aged 37–38)
- Issue: Lashkari I Mansur I Abu-Nasr
- House: Hashimids
- Father: Ahmad of Derbent
- Religion: Islam

Maymun ibn Ahmad (Arabic: ميمون بن أحمد), known as Maymun I (959 – 27 February 997), was the Hashimid emir of Derbent from 976 until his death. He came to the emirate at seventeen and was immediately reduced to a figurehead by the city's chiefs (ru'asa), who imprisoned him in the government building and demolished the citadel's inner wall. His attempt to break their control by hiring Rus mercenaries in 987 ended in their massacre, and the presence of his surviving Rus guardsmen provoked the revolt of the preacher Musa al-Tuzi, which cost him his city and drew the Shirvanshah into Derbent. He recovered the town by force in 992 and the citadel in 993, and ruled until his death four years later. Almost everything known of Maymun's reign derives from the Ta'rikh Bab al-abwab, an anonymous history of Derbent compiled about 1106 and preserved in quotations by the 17th-century Ottoman compiler Münejjim Bashi.

== Reign ==
Maymun was born in 348 AH (959/960 CE), a son of the emir Ahmad ibn Abd al-Malik, who had ruled Derbent for some forty years and died in November 976. On his accession Maymun remained in the citadel where his father had lived, but he was soon brought down and imprisoned in the government building, the residence in the lower town, while the inhabitants began to dismantle the middle or transverse wall of the citadel, which had stood seven years and one month. Maymun remained a prisoner there and all power lay in the hands of the chiefs. Vladimir Minorsky observed that the unruly chiefs had again taken advantage of the youth of their emir and to reduce him to the position of a puppet. Maymun had two brothers - Hassan ibn Ahmad, who died in 375 AH (985/986 CE) and Muhammad.

From his confinement Maymun secretly sought help from the Rus against the chiefs, and in 377 AH (987/988 CE) they arrived in eighteen ships. They first sent a single ship to discover whether the emir really wished to employ them; but when they brought Maymun out of his confinement, the people of Derbent acted together and massacred that crew to the last man. The remaining ships sailed on to Masqat and plundered it, and from there went on to Shirvan, Muqan and Kur river. This is the earliest mention of the Rus in the chronicle. Minorsky calculated from al-Mas'udi's figures that a fleet of eighteen ships would have carried some 1,800 men, and considered that the emir's ability to open secret communications with them implies they cannot have been far away; of the seventeen ships that sailed on he remarked that their subsequent movements are unknown, but that they had certainly not gone south to pick violets. In 378 AH (988/989 CE) Maymun rebuilt the citadel of Derbent and fortified himself in it.

In 379 AH (989/990 CE) the disturbance of Musa al-Tuzi, a preacher from Gilan, broke out in Derbent. Arriving in the city, he convened a meeting in the congregational mosque at which more than a thousand men repented before him; he then led them to the Tower of the Vault, and Maymun himself took a vow to abstain from wine. Matters went so far that the preacher gained control of all government business. He demanded that the emir hand over his Rus ghulams, so that he might offer them Islam or else kill them, and when Maymun refused, disturbances broke out. Minorsky suggested that the harbouring of the Rus at Derbent may itself have been the cause of al-Tuzi's intervention, since as a native of Gilan he was probably impressed by recent Russian depredations in the region of Muqan and apprehensive of new attacks on the southern shore of the Caspian. Minorsky emphasised that the events of 987 did not deter Maymun from relying on the Rus, and that rather than surrender them he withdrew with them to Tabasaran at the cost of temporarily losing his throne. He inferred that the number of Rus in the emir's service must have been considerable, and that they formed around him a kind of druzhina, or comitatus.

In 380 AH (990/991 CE) Maymun fortified himself in the citadel against the preacher. Al-Tuzi and the people of Derbent besieged him there for twenty-eight days, until the emir asked for safe conduct on condition that he surrender the citadel and depart with his ghulams for Tabasaran. This was granted; al-Tuzi dismantled the middle wall and took control of the town, then invited the Shirvanshah Muhammad ibn Ahmad to come. The Shirvanshah arrived at the March and was met by the local notables and chiefs and by the inhabitants from the lowest to the highest, who brought him in with great honour.

In the same year Balid, a mamluk of Maymun's, set upon the Shirvanshah in the government building and wounded him by striking him on the back of the head with a battle-axe and then fled to his master in Tabasaran. The wounded Shirvanshah was carried back to Shirvan by his men, and Maymun reoccupied the country. He was expelled again in 381 AH (991/992 CE), and the Shirvanshah was brought back and rebuilt and fortified the citadel; he returned to his own capital and died there in November 991.

In 382 AH (992/993 CE) Maymun returned, burnt the Damascus gate and occupied the town. In 383 AH (993/994 CE) he wrested the citadel from the Shirvanshah as well and dismantled the middle wall that the Shirvanshah had built, which had stood one year and five months. In the same year he had the Damascus gate and the Palestine gate made of pure iron.

In 385 AH (995/996 CE) the people of al-Karakh were converted to Islam by Maymun. Minorsky connected their conversion with the part they took nearly forty years later in repelling the Alans and the Rus from their town, while noting that later events showed Islam sat lightly on them.

== Death and succession ==
Maymun died on 27 February 997, after a reign of twenty-one years and at the age of thirty-eight. He was succeeded by his brother Muhammad ibn Ahmad, who ruled ten months and eighteen days before being murdered by one of Maymun's ghulams in open country near the Jihad gate in December 997. Four months later the oath was taken to Maymun's son Lashkari, who ruled four years; on Lashkari's death in September 1002 the emirate passed to another son, Mansur, while a third son, Abu-Nasr, was executed by the Shirvanshah Yazid ibn Ahmad, who had held him hostage since Maymun's own lifetime.

== Sources ==
- Minorsky, Vladimir (1958). A History of Sharvān and Darband in the 10th-11th Centuries. Cambridge: W. Heffer & Sons.

Preceded by Ahmad of Derbent	Emir of Derbent; 976–990	Succeeded by Muhammad ibn Ahmad
Preceded by Muhammad ibn Ahmad	Emir of Derbent; 992–997	Succeeded by Muhammad II of Derbent
