= Abd al-Barr ibn Anbasa =

Christian Lord of Qabala between 981 and 999

- Lord of Qabala
- Reign: fl. 981 – 999
- Predecessor: Anbasa al-A'war
- Successor: principality absorbed by Shirvanshahs
- Father: Anbasa al-A'war
- Religion: Christian

Abd al-Barr ibn Anbasa (Arabic: عبد البر بن عنبسة) was the ruler of Qabala, a principality on the western frontier of Shirvan, attested between 981 and 999. He was the last known member of his family to hold the town, losing Qabala to the Shirvanshah Muhammad III in 981 and the castle of Gurzul to Yazid II in 999.

== Background ==
Qabala, the former capital of Caucasian Albania was in the basin of the Goychay, some 85 km west of the Shirvanian capital, and had apparently become the chief local centre of Khazar occupation in the century before the Arab conquest. Al-Baladhuri preserves the tradition that the Sasanian king Qubad, after subduing Arran as far as Shirvan, founded Baylakan, Barda'a and "the city of Qabala, which is al-Khazar", before raising a mud-brick barrier between the lands of Shirvan and Arran.

In the time of al-Mas'udi the townspeople of Qabala were Muslims while the surrounding countryside remained Christian, and the principality lay outside the Mazyadid domain and, in effect, outside Islam save for its capital. It was the nearest principality to Shirvan proper on the west, and successive shahs made strenuous efforts to push their frontier into it; relations were not wholly severed, however, since Istakhri records cordial dealings between the people of Qabala and those of Layzan, who guarded the approaches to the Caucasus further north.

== Career ==
In 981 the Shirvanshah Muhammad III, pursuing a policy of expansion, took possession of the town of Qabala from Abd al-Barr, and of Barda'a in about 982. Christoph Baumer describes the seizure of the predominantly Christian city, identified with the site of Chukhur-Qabala, as an attack by Shirvan on its western neighbour.

The conquest had consequences after Muhammad III's death. In 992 the Shirvanian army under the new shah Yazid II met the army of Shakki near Qabala and suffered severe losses; the Shirvanians lost four hundred cavalry and their vizier Musaddin ibn Habashi. Minorsky treats these developments near Qabala in 992 as a continuation of the struggle of 981.

Yazid II thereafter set about reorganising his army, entrusting the task to Abd al-Aziz and Abd al-Samad, the two sons of Abbas Bardawi, and in 999 he took the castle of Gurzul from Abd al-Barr, by then described as the former lord of Qabala. By this date the sources refer to him only as lord of the castle of Gurzul, an indication of how far his position had contracted since 981. Nothing further is recorded of him; Gurzul was still in the hands of the Shirvanshahs in 1025.

The ruins of Gurzul have been identified with Girdadul on the western bank of the Goychay, in the fork of the two head-waters of the Turyan, an identification suggested by Zeki Velidi Togan and considered likely by Vladimir Minorsky; the western head-water of the Goychay above Girdadul is called Gruduz, which may reflect the same name. The district also contained the villages of Quni – in Arabic quni, "canals" – which Minorsky likewise located near Qabala.

== Family and identity ==
Abd al-Barr was the son of the ruler whom al-Mas'udi names as Anbasa al-A'war, "Anbasa the One-eyed" – rendered by Baumer as "one-eyed lion" – lord of Qabala in the first half of the 10th century. Mas'udi describes his kingdom as one in which the townsmen were Muslims and the people of the settlements and estates Christians, and calls him a harbourer of robbers, adventurers and rascals (sa'alik). The name appears in the manuscript tradition of Istakhri in the corrupt form al-Absiya.

Minorsky held that the Arabic form of the name is no argument for the family's Arab origin, since most Christian notables of the region in that period had adopted purely fictitious Arabic names and patronymics bearing little relation to their real ones; he suggested that Anbasa may have been the offspring of an Albano-Armenian family, and that Anbasa – "the lion" – was a nickname, possibly rendering Leo or Levon. In a separate study he proposed, tentatively, to identify Anbasa with Vashaqan (Vač'agan?) ibn Musa, the lord of J.rz who in 955 agreed to pay the Musafirid ruler Marzuban ibn Muhammad 200,000 dirhams. Against the usual restoration of J.rz as Georgia, Minorsky objected that Marzuban never penetrated so far and that Vač'agan is not a Georgian name, reading the term instead as Khazar in the local sense in which it was applied to Qabala – citing al-Baladhuri's identification of the city with al-Khazar. On this reading Anbasa's real name would have been Vač'agan son of Musa, a prince connected in some way with the ruling family of Arran. Minorsky described the suggestion as purely tentative, but noted that it would be strange if Qabala, which Mas'udi treats as a separate principality, were unrepresented in Ibn Hawqal's list of Marzuban's vassals.

== Sources ==
- al-Baladhuri (2022). History of the Arab Invasions: The Conquest of the Lands. Translated by Hitti, Philip K. introduction by Hugh Kennedy. London: I.B. Tauris. ISBN 9780755637423.
- Baumer, Christoph (2021). History of the Caucasus, Volume 1: At the Crossroads of Empires. London: I.B. Tauris.
- Miquel, André (2017). Géographie arabe et représentation du monde: la terre et ses parties [Arab geography and representation of the world: the earth and its parts] (in French). De Gruyter. ISBN 9783111609010.
- Madelung, Wilferd (1975). "The minor dynasties of northern Iran". In Frye, R. N. (ed.). The Cambridge History of Iran, Volume 4: From the Arab Invasion to the Saljuqs. Cambridge: Cambridge University Press. pp. 198–249.
- Minorsky, Vladimir (1958). A History of Sharvān and Darband in the 10th-11th Centuries. Cambridge: W. Heffer & Sons.
- Minorsky, Vladimir (1953). "Caucasica IV". Bulletin of the School of Oriental and African Studies. 15 (3): 504–529.
