= Abd al-Malik I of Derbent =

Abd al-Malik I

Emir of Derbent
- Reign: 4 January 916 – 24 February 939 (interrupted in 916)
- Predecessor: Muhammad I
- Successor: Ahmad of Derbent
- Died: 24 February 939
- Issue: Ahmad of Derbent
- House: Hashimids
- Father: Hashim of Derbent
- Religion: Islam

Abd al-Malik ibn Hashim (Arabic: عبد الملك بن هاشم; died 24 February 939), known as Abd al-Malik I, was the fourth Hashimid emir of Derbent, ruling from 916 until his death. He was the third son of the dynasty's founder Hashim ibn Suraqa to hold the emirate, following his brothers Umar and Muhammad.

== Reign ==
Abd al-Malik succeeded his brother Muhammad on 4 January 916 while noting that the chronicle's weekday does not agree with the date. His nephew Abu'l-Najm ibn Muhammad ibn Hashim at once revolted against him and, being favoured by the people of Derbent, expelled his uncle and took his place on 2 March 916. Abd al-Malik withdrew to Shandan, while Abu'l-Najm fought the people of Tabasaran in June 916 without success. Minorsky suggested that the name Abu'l-Najm may be a reminiscence of Najm ibn Hashim, the ancestor of the dynasty put to death by the caliphal governor Sa'id ibn Salm a century earlier.

Abd al-Malik then went to Yusuf ibn Abi'l-Saj, the governor of Azerbaijan on the caliph's behalf, who confirmed him in the governorship of Derbent and gave him 6,000 warriors from the Sajid troops. With their help he defeated the people of Derbent, entered the town with his Sajid soldiers and put Abu'l-Najm to flight.

A few months later, his rule consolidated, Abd al-Malik learned that his nephew was staying at a place near Shabaran and believed himself safe. He attacked, intending to take him prisoner, but Abu'l-Najm was warned, went by another road to Derbent and entered the city by night; Abd al-Malik returned and besieged him there. A certain Salifan then came to the emir's assistance with a Khazar army; Abu'l-Najm and all his companions were captured and Abd al-Malik was able to enter the town. Having triumphed over his brother's son, he had him killed, after which his position was unopposed.

The chronicle plays down the character of Abd al-Malik's relations with the Sajids. Yusuf ibn Abi'l-Saj visited Derbent in person and, on instructions from Baghdad, rebuilt the walls of the town. Hilal al-Sabi' preserves the report of Abu-Ali al-Hasan ibn al-Hamdun, who accompanied Yusuf to the districts of Derbent: Yusuf sent an estimate of 70,000 dirhams for the repairs to Baghdad, but the vizier Abu'l-Hasan ibn al-Furat reminded him of the materials stored at Derbent by the Sasanian king Anushirvan, and the expense was reduced to the workmen's wages alone. Minorsky placed the visit in the early part of Ibn al-Furat's second vizierate, which ran from May 917 to October 918.

Yusuf's protection did not last. In 305 AH (917/918 CE) the caliph had to send an army against him; operating in the region of Rayy he defeated Khaqan al-Muflihi and his successor Mu'nis al-Muzaffar, but in June 919 Mu'nis captured him and took him to Baghdad. Minorsky judged that it was the fall of his protector that drove Abd al-Malik to seek help from the Khazars.

In October 930 a battle was fought between Abd al-Malik and the Shirvanshah at the gate of Shabaran. The clash belongs to the period when Shirvan and Layzan had been united under Abu Tahir Yazid, whose son Muhammad was then governing Layzan.

In 326 AH (937/938 CE) Abd al-Malik led a raid against a place whose name is mutilated in the manuscripts, conquering it, killing its men, carrying off its women and children and driving away its cattle; Minorsky inferred from the use of the word ghaza and from the taking of captives that the expedition was directed against non-Muslims. In the same year he sent his minister Abu'l-Fawaris with a body of cavalry from Derbent and Khaydaq against a village which the manuscripts call Aran; they attacked by night, killed a number of the notables of Shandan and took possession of the place.

== Death and succession ==
Abd al-Malik died on 24 February 939 after a reign of twenty-four years. Al-Mas'udi, writing five years later, refers to him as a ruler who used to rule at Derbent. Three days after his death the oath of allegiance was taken to his son Ahmad, then a child of four. Minorsky held that this infancy accounts for the confusion which followed: after five months the chiefs revolted, drove the boy from the town and swore allegiance instead to Haytham (son of Muhammad II of Shirvan), the lord of Tabasaran, whom they brought into Derbent. Haytham ruled about two years until his expulsion in May 941, after which Ahmad was brought back. It is from this period, Minorsky wrote, that the pernicious role of the chiefs becomes conspicuous and the intervention of the Shirvanians continuous.

== Sources ==
- Canard, Marius (1971). "Ḥamdānids". In Lewis, B.; Ménage, V. L.; Pellat, Ch. & Schacht, J. (eds.). The Encyclopaedia of Islam, Second Edition. Volume III: H–Iram. Leiden: E. J. Brill. pp. 126–131. OCLC 495469525.
- Madelung, W. (1975). "The Minor Dynasties of Northern Iran". In Frye, Richard N. (ed.). The Cambridge History of Iran: From the Arab Invasion to the Saljuqs. Vol. 4. Cambridge: Cambridge University Press. pp. 198–249. ISBN 0-521-20093-8.
- Minorsky, Vladimir (1958). A History of Sharvān and Darband in the 10th-11th Centuries. Cambridge: W. Heffer & Sons.

Preceded by Muhammad I	Emir of Derbent; 916–939	Succeeded by Ahmad of Derbent
