= Hashim of Derbent =

Hashim ibn Suraqa

Emir of Derbent
- Reign: 869 – 884
- Predecessor: (position established)
- Successor: Umar
- Died: 884
- Issue: Umar; Muhammad; Abd al-Malik
- House: Hashimids
- Father: Suraqa ibn Salis
- Religion: Islam

Hashim ibn Suraqa al-Sulami (Arabic: هاشم بن سراقة السلمي; died 884) was the first independent emir of Derbent, ruling from 869 until his death, and the founder of the Hashimid dynasty that governed the city and its frontier districts for some two centuries. He was raised to power by the townspeople and the ghazis of the frontier during the disorder that followed the murder of the caliph al-Mutawakkil, and ruled, according to the chronicle, only in consultation with the notables and chiefs of the city.

== Family background ==
The dynasty's ancestors were not Arabs of the Banu Sulaym but clients (mawali) of that tribe, a point Vladimir Minorsky considered noteworthy given how many governors bearing the nisba Sulami appear in the history of Arab administration in Armenia. Hashim's descent is given as Hashim ibn Suraqa ibn Salis ibn Hayyun ibn Najm ibn Hashim.

The family is attested at Derbent nearly a century before Hashim's accession. According to al-Ya'qubi, when Harun al-Rashid sent Sa'id ibn Salm al-Bahili to Armenia, the lord of Derbent was Najm ibn Hashim. Some months later the inhabitants of the city opposed Sa'id and attacked his financial agent; Sa'id put Najm to death, whereupon Najm's son Hayyun revolted and made contact with the khagan of the Khazars, who came with an army, inflicted great damage on the Muslims and advanced as far as the Araxes. Al-Tabari, placing the events in 183/799, wrote that no comparable calamity had been heard of in Islamic times. Harun al-Rashid disapproved of Sa'id's conduct and dismissed him, and the country was eventually pacified by Yazid ibn Mazyad al-Shaybani, the founder of the dynasty of Shirvan.

Alison Vacca notes that Ya'qubi's brief account gives only a blurred impression of a rebellion by local elites, and that Ibn A'tham al-Kufi supplies a fuller narrative. In his version the dispute arose over taxation: Sa'id ibn Salm, established at Barda, sent his functionary Nasr ibn Ayyan to Derbent together with a tax-collector named Harith, a client of the Barmakid vizier al-Fadl ibn Yahya. The people of the city objected that taxes had never been levied on them because of their proximity to the enemy and because they fought the Khazars; Nasr wrote to Sa'id for instructions, recommending that the taxes be collected despite the precedent. Resistance gathered around Hayyun ibn Najm, and when Harith came to the city he was refused entry and his companions were killed. Nothing is known of the rebel Hayyun's fate, but his great-grandson Hashim rose in 869 as the founder of an autonomous dynasty. Minorsky observed that the chronicler, who is favourable to the Hashimids, passes over this blemish in their antecedents.

== Reign ==
Before Hashim the emirs of Derbent and the Marches had been appointed in turn as representatives of the Umayyads and then of the Abbasids; it was under these governors, in 218/833, that the independent rulers of Masqat were displaced and their land occupied.

Hashim ibn Suraqa became emir of Derbent in 255 AH (868/869 CE). He was, the chronicle says, one of the renowned chiefs (ru'asa) and warriors of the Marches. After the murder of al-Mutawakkil in 861 the caliphate had been thrown into disorder as the Turkish clients seized control of the administration, and the people of Derbent and the ghazis of the Marches appointed Hashim their emir and obeyed him faithfully.

The chronicle's account of his government is favourable and, unusually, describes its constitutional character. His conduct towards the people was good and he acted with justice and equity, proceeding in affairs only after consulting the wise men (uqala) and the chiefs, and undertaking nothing except what they had agreed upon; in his days, the chronicler adds, order prevailed in the affairs of the Marches and the frontier posts, and the enemies of the city feared him.

Hashim campaigned against the neighbouring non-Muslim powers of the mountains. In 263 AH (876/877 CE) he led a raid against Sarir, inflicting great slaughter on its people, looting their property, carrying off their women and children and returning in triumph; he repeated the raid in 265 AH (878/879 CE) and again returned victorious. He ruled sixteen years and died in 271 AH (884/885 CE).

== Family ==
Hashim had three sons who all succeeded him in turn:

1. Umar b. Hashim (d. 886)
2. Muhammad b. Hashim (d. 916)
3. Abd al-Malik b. Hashim (d. 939)

== Historiography ==
The account of Hashim's reign comes from the Ta'rikh Bab al-abwab, an anonymous history of Derbent compiled about 1106 and preserved in quotations by the 17th-century Ottoman compiler Münejjim Bashi. Minorsky judged that the text of the older Ta'rikh al-Bab appears to begin at this point in the narrative. The introductory paragraph on Masqat that precedes it is Münejjim Bashi's own addition; al-Baladhuri confirms that Masqat had kings first appointed by Anushirvan whose kingship had since been abolished, and distinguishes its "lord" from the shahs of Shirvan, Layzan, Tabasaran, Filan and Khursan.

The manuscripts disagree over Hashim's nisba: one gives al-Saljuqi for al-Sulami, an evident blunder that a scribe appears to have marked, while another follows the correct form with bil-wala, which Minorsky suggested may be either a later guess or a correct reading indicating that Hashim held his position "by right of clientship".

== Sources ==
- Bosworth, C. E., ed. (1989). The History of al-Ṭabarī, Volume XXX: The ʿAbbāsid Caliphate in Equilibrium: The Caliphates of Mūsā al-Hādī and Hārūn al-Rashīd, A.D. 785–809/A.H. 169–192. SUNY Series in Near Eastern Studies. Albany, New York: State University of New York Press. ISBN 978-0-88706-564-4.
- Minorsky, Vladimir (1958). A History of Sharvān and Darband in the 10th-11th Centuries. Cambridge: W. Heffer & Sons.

New title Independence from the Abbasid Caliphate	Emir of Derbent; 869–884	Succeeded by Umar
