= Muhammad II of Derbent =

Muhammad II

Emir of Derbent
- Reign: February 997 – December 997
- Predecessor: Maymun I
- Successor: Lashkari I
- Died: December 997; Derbent, Emirate of Derbent
- House: Hashimids
- Father: Ahmad of Derbent
- Religion: Islam

Muhammad ibn Ahmad (Arabic: محمد بن أحمد; died December 997), known as Muhammad II, was the Hashimid emir of Derbent for ten months in 997. A son of Ahmad ibn Abd al-Malik, he was established in the emirate on the death of his brother Maymun I and was murdered before the year was out by one of his late brother's ghulams.

== Reign ==
Maymun I died on 27 February 997 after a reign of twenty-one years, and his brother Muhammad ibn Ahmad ibn Abd al-Malik was established in his place. He ruled at Derbent for ten months and eighteen days.

In December 997 he was murdered in the open country near the Jihad gate by a ghulam of his brother Maymun. Maymun had maintained a substantial guard of Rus retainers, whom Vladimir Minorsky described as forming a kind of druzhina about him, and whom Maymun had refused to surrender to the preacher Musa al-Tuzi in 989 even at the cost of temporarily losing his throne; the chronicle does not say whether the murderer was one of these men.

Four months after the murder, in March 998, the oath of fealty was taken to his brother's son Lashkari ibn Maymun, who ruled four years and twenty-four days before dying in September 1002. The emirate then passed to Lashkari's brother Mansur.

== Sources ==
- Minorsky, Vladimir (1958). A History of Sharvān and Darband in the 10th-11th Centuries. Cambridge: W. Heffer & Sons.

| Preceded by Maymun I | Emir of Derbent; February 997 – December 997 | Succeeded by Lashkari I |
