= Ahmad of Derbent =

Ahmad ibn Abd al-Malik

Emir of Derbent
- Reign: February 939 – July 939
- Predecessor: Abd al-Malik I
- Successor: Haytham ibn Muhammad

Emir of Derbent
- Reign: May 941 – December 941
- Predecessor: Haytham ibn Muhammad
- Successor: Haytham ibn Muhammad

Emir of Derbent
- Reign: March 954 – November 976
- Predecessor: Khashram Ahmad ibn Munabbih
- Successor: Maymun I
- Born: 935
- Died: 976 (aged 40–41)
- Issue: Maymun; Hassan
- House: Hashimids
- Father: Abd al-Malik I
- Religion: Islam

Ahmad ibn Abd al-Malik (Arabic: أحمد بن عبد الملك; 935 – November 976) was the Hashimid emir of Derbent, holding the emirate in three separate periods between 939 and his death in 976. He succeeded his father Abd al-Malik I as a child of four.

== Reign ==
Ahmad was born in 323 AH (934/935 CE), and the oath of allegiance was taken to him three days after his father's death in February 939. After five months the chiefs revolted, drove him from the town and swore allegiance instead to Haytham ibn Muhammad ibn Yazid, the lord of Tabasaran, whom they brought into Derbent. Haytham ruled about two years and was expelled in May 941, whereupon Ahmad was brought back and the oath taken to him a second time; but he was deposed again after six months, in December 941, and Haytham was restored. Minorsky suggested that this Haytham may have been a brother of Abu Tahir Yazid, and so a son of the elder Muhammad ibn Yazid, lord of Layzan; he is to be distinguished from the Haytham ibn Muhammad ibn Abu-Tahir Yazid who appears in 968, a son of the Shirvanshah Muhammad ibn Abu-Tahir Yazid.

Haytham in turn was deposed after six months, and the people of Derbent swore fealty to his father, whom the chronicle calls the Shirvanshah Muhammad ibn Yazid, and who sent his brother Ahmad ibn Yazid to the city as his lieutenant. Minorsky regarded this passage as confused. Both the father and the son of Abu Tahir Yazid bore the name Muhammad ibn Yazid, and no ruler of that name is likely to have been reigning in 942: the chapter on Shirvan states that in 333 AH (944/945 CE) the people of Derbent recognised Abu Tahir Yazid and that he sent them his son Ahmad as his deputy, which Minorsky preferred. On his reconstruction it was Abu Tahir who sent Ahmad ibn Yazid, and Ahmad was his son rather than his brother. He was deposed and expelled in 342 AH (953/954 CE), and in his place the chiefs installed Khashram Ahmad ibn Munabbih, the king of the Lakz, in September 953; they deposed him too and drove him from their country in March 954, and brought Ahmad ibn Abd al-Malik back for the third time.

In 358 AH (968/969 CE), Ibrahim ibn Marzuban came to Shirvan and sent word to Ahmad requiring him to present himself; Ahmad neither answered nor came. The sallar sent a detachment to raid Masqat, but the local people occupied the defiles and the roads, killed a great many of the invaders and put the rest to flight. Minorsky connected the disturbances of these years with Daylamite activity, noting that Marzuban ibn Muhammad had been suppressing a local rebellion near Derbent in 344 AH (955/956 CE) and that Ibrahim's arrival represented a second wave of Musafirid expansion northwards.

In the same year Haytham ibn Muhammad ibn Abu-Tahir Yazid, brother of the reigning Shirvanshah Ahmad, took asylum with the emir after fleeing the sallar, and was received honourably. The emir negotiated on his behalf, asking the Shirvanshah to grant him a part of Shirvan; the Shirvanshah refused and answered with threats. Ahmad thereupon gathered an army from the outlying districts, chiefly from Sarir, marched on Shirvan, stormed Shabaran and burnt and plundered it, carrying off great spoils. On the way back the Saririans entered Derbent a day ahead of the emir; disturbances broke out in the town, a hundred of the Sarir chiefs were killed and all the booty taken from Shirvan was seized from them.

In 359 AH (969/970 CE) Ahmad rebuilt the citadel of Derbent and fortified himself in it. In February 971 a violent battle was fought between the people of Derbent and those of Sarir near the Jihad gate, in which the Muslims were worsted and about a thousand men of Derbent, together with outsiders and volunteers, were killed.

Ahmad continued to rule until his death in November 976. He was succeeded by his son Maymun, then seventeen years old, whom the chiefs at once reduced to a figurehead. Another son, Hassan, died in 375 AH (985/986 CE).

== Sources ==
- Minorsky, Vladimir (1958). A History of Sharvān and Darband in the 10th-11th Centuries. Cambridge: W. Heffer & Sons.

Preceded by Abd al-Malik I	Emir of Derbent; February 939 – July 939	Succeeded by Haytham ibn Muhammad
Preceded by Haytham ibn Muhammad	Emir of Derbent; May 941 – December 941	Succeeded by Haytham ibn Muhammad
Preceded by Khashram Ahmad ibn Munabbih	Emir of Derbent; March 954 – November 976	Succeeded by Maymun I
