= Lashkari I of Derbent =

Lashkari I

Emir of Derbent
- Reign: March 998 – September 1002
- Predecessor: Muhammad II
- Successor: Mansur I
- Died: September 1002
- House: Hashimids
- Father: Maymun I
- Religion: Islam

Lashkari ibn Maymun (Arabic: لشكري بن ميمون; died September 1002), known as Lashkari I, was the Hashimid emir of Derbent from 998 until his death in 1002. A son of Maymun I, he came to power four months after the murder of his uncle Muhammad II, and his short reign was taken up with a war against the Shirvanshah Yazid ibn Ahmad over an estate on the frontier between the two states.

== Reign ==
Lashkari's uncle Muhammad ibn Ahmad was murdered near the Jihad gate in December 997, and four months later, in March 998, the oath of fealty was taken to Lashkari.

In 389 AH (998/999 CE) the Shirvanshah Yazid offered him battle near the estate of Rizqiya and captured him. Minorsky suggested that the estate, which the manuscripts give as Z.rqiya and which he read as Rizqiya, from rizq, "daily bread", may have been one of those assigned to the ghazis of Derbent, though he could not determine whether it was the same place as the Marzuqiya where the Shirvanshah Ali ibn Haytham had been killed in 917.

The chapter on Shirvan gives a fuller and rather different account of the campaign. There the dispute over the ownership of the estate went against the Shirvanians; Lashkari advanced on Shabaran, but the Shirvanians met him at the town gate and the men of Derbent suffered an ignominious defeat, in which Lashkari's brother Abu-Nasr was captured. Yazid imprisoned him, and after peace was made Abu-Nasr remained his hostage. The chapter on Derbent, by contrast, has Lashkari defeat the Shirvanshah at the gate of Shabaran after being captured near Rizqiya.

Lashkari died in September 1002 after a reign of four years and twenty-four days.

== Aftermath ==
Eight and a half months after Lashkari's death the oath was taken to his brother Mansur. The people of Derbent asked Yazid ibn Ahmad to release Abu-Nasr, whom they wished to make their emir; the Shirvanshah refused, saying that he wished to marry Abu-Nasr to his daughter and would do this and that for him on condition that he be allowed to build (or rebuild) the citadels of Derbent and of Sul. The people of Derbent declined the condition, and Yazid put Abu-Nasr to death although he bore no guilt. Abu-Nasr had been held in the castle of Shabaran, and the Shirvanshah buried him near its gate. This happened in 392 AH (1001/1002 CE), whereupon the people of Derbent proclaimed Mansur. The chapter on Derbent places the killing in 393 AH (1002/1003 CE), the year of Mansur's accession, and says the Shirvanshah had held Abu-Nasr as a hostage since the time of their father Maymun and killed him without any apparent reason.

== Sources ==
- Minorsky, Vladimir (1958). A History of Sharvān and Darband in the 10th-11th Centuries. Cambridge: W. Heffer & Sons.

Preceded by Muhammad II	Emir of Derbent; March 998 – September 1002	Succeeded by Mansur I
