= Mazyadids =

Mazyadids may refer to:

- Banu Mazyad, an Arab Shia dynasty that ruled Kufa and Hilla in Iraq between c. 961 and c. 1160
- Yazidids, also called Mazyadids, an Arab dynasty that ruled Shirvan in Azerbaijan from 861 to 1027
