= Layzanshah =

- 861–956
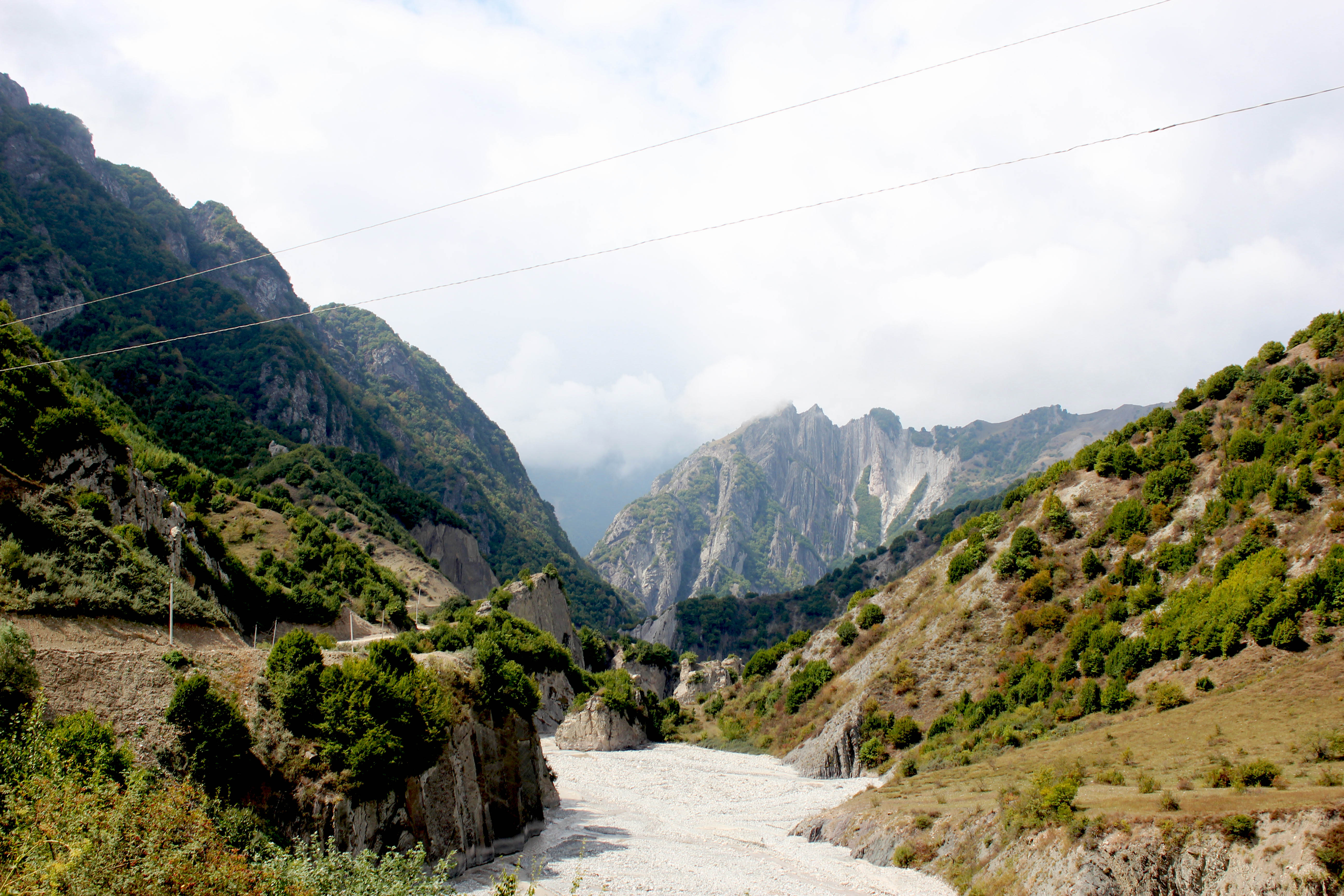
- Valley of Girdiman where Layzan was located
- Capital: Layzan (possibly)
- Common languages: Persian (court, literature, dynastic); Arabic (initially dynastic)
- Religion: Sunni Islam
- Government: Governorship, later monarchy
  - 861–?: Yazid ibn Khalid (first)
  - 948 – 956: Ahmad (last)
- Historical era: Middle Ages
  - Established: 861
  - Disestablished: 956
Preceded by	Succeeded by
Abbasid Caliphate	Shirvanshah
- Today part of: Azerbaijan

Layzānshah (Persian: لایزان‌شاه) or Shah of Layzān was a historical title given to the lords of Layzan. According to Vladimir Minorsky, the title was first granted to local rulers by their Sassanid Persian overlords, medieval authors specifically mentioning Anushirvan.

Layzān was a principality formed around modern Lahıc, Azerbaijan and covered valley of Girdimanchay, whose population might be migrants from Lahijan in Gilan. Ibn Hawqal mentioned Layzān as part of Arran, while Al-Masudi in chapter 17 of his The Meadows of Gold placed it in periphery of Shirvan.

After Anarchy at Samarra, the title was acquired by Haytham ibn Khalid's brother Yazid ibn Khalid and passed on to his children. The latter's grandson Abu Tahir Yazid attacked his cousin Ali I and killed all of his family save for his grandson, thus holding both titles of Layzanshah and Shirvanshah together. Later Layzan was granted as a fief to sons of Shirvanshahs.

Known holders of the title include:

1. Yazid ibn Khalid (861–?, son of Khalid ibn Yazid al-Shaybani)
2. Muhammad of Layzan
3. Abu Tahir Yazid (?–917)
4. Muhammad II (917–948)
5. Ahmad (948–956)

Layzān became a traditional title by 10th century and fell into disuse.

== Sources ==
- Minorsky, Vladimir (1937). Hudud al-'Alam, The Regions of the World A Persian Geography, 372 A.H. - 982 A.D. translated and explained by V. Minorsky (PDF). London: Luzac & Co. p. 546.
- Minorsky, Vladimir (1958). A History of Sharvān and Darband in the 10th-11th Centuries. Cambridge: W. Heffer and Sons. OCLC 5042566.
