= Yazidids =

Arab family

- Parent family: Banu Shayban
- Founded: 8th century
- Founder: Yazid ibn Mazyad al-Shaybani
- Titles: Shirvanshah; Layzanshah; Emir of Derbent
- Connected families: Kasranids; Darbandids

The Yazidids (Arabic: بنو يزيد, romanized: Bānū Yāzīd) or Mazyadids (after their ancestor Mazyad al-Shaybani) or Shaybanids (after Banu Shayban), were an Arab family that came to rule over the region of Shirvan (in Azerbaijan) in the mid 9th century. Starting from Haytham ibn Khalid's assumption of the ancient Iranian title of Shirvanshah in 861, they practically broke free of Abbasid control and was therefore out of scope for most chroniclers of the Caliphate.

== Branches ==
The dynasty was named after Yazid ibn Mazyad al-Shaybani, an Abbasid Governor of Arminiyah. Yazidid dynasty was first generation of whole independent Shirvanshahs. Dynasty ruled both Shirvan and Layzan, until latter invaded Shamakhy and united crowns. The dynasty was a vassal and tributary state to Sallarids, Sajids and others. The Mazyadid reign is largely unexplored due to lack of sources. Sometimes numismatic evidences are the only sources about reign and existence of shahs.

== Genealogy ==
- Mazyad b. Za'ida
  - Yazid ibn Mazyad al-Shaybani, Ostikan (d. c. 801)
    - Muhammad ibn Yazid, Ostikan (c. 802/803)
    - Asad ibn Yazid al-Shaybani, Ostikan (d. c. 820)
    - Khalid ibn Yazid al-Shaybani, Ostikan (802–844)
      - Muhammad ibn Khalid al-Shaybani, Ostikan (c. 844–859)
      - Haytham I, Shirvanshah (861–?)
        - Muhammad I, Shirvanshah
          - Haytham II, Shirvanshah
            - Ali I, Shirvanshah (?–917)
              - Abbas
                - Abu Bakr
      - Yazid ibn Khalid, Layzanshah (861–?)
        - Muhammad I, Layzanshah (?–917)
          - Yazid I (917–948)
            - Abd ul-Badr ibn Yazid
            - Ahmad, Emir of Derbent (c. 944)
              - Abul-Haytham
            - Muhammad II — Layzanshah (917–948), Tabasaranshah (917–948), Shirvanshah (948–956)
              - Haytham ibn Muhammad, Tabasaranshah (948–?)
              - Ahmad, Layzanshah (948–956), Shirvanshah (948–981)
                - Muhammad III (981–991)
                - Yazid II (991–1027)
                  - Became ancestor of Kasranids
                - Haytham ibn Ahmad, Tabasaranshah (?–1025)
  - Ahmad, Ostikan (c. 811-812)

== Sources ==
- Barthold, W. & Bosworth, C.E. (1997a). "S̲h̲īrwān S̲h̲āh". In Bosworth, C. E.; van Donzel, E.; Heinrichs, W. P. & Lecomte, G. (eds.). The Encyclopaedia of Islam, Second Edition. Volume IX: San–Sze. Leiden: E. J. Brill. pp. 488–489. ISBN 978-90-04-10422-8.
- Barthold, W. & Bosworth, C.E. (1997b). "S̲h̲īrwān". In Bosworth, C. E.; van Donzel, E.; Heinrichs, W. P. & Lecomte, G. (eds.). The Encyclopaedia of Islam, Second Edition. Volume IX: San–Sze. Leiden: E. J. Brill. pp. 487–488. ISBN 978-90-04-10422-8.
- Bosworth, C. E. (1996). The New Islamic Dynasties: A Chronological and Genealogical Manual. New York City: Columbia University Press. ISBN 0-231-10714-5.
- Bosworth, C. E. (2011). "Šervānšāhs". Encyclopaedia Iranica.
- Madelung, Wilferd (1975). "Minor dynasties of northern Iran". In Frye, Richard N. (ed.). The Cambridge History of Iran: From the Arab Invasion to the Saljuqs. Vol. 4. Cambridge: Cambridge University Press. pp. 198–250. ISBN 0-521-20093-8.
- Minorsky, Vladimir (1958). A History of Sharvān and Darband in the 10th-11th Centuries. Cambridge: W. Heffer & Sons, Ltd.
- Ter-Ghewondyan, Aram (1976) [1965]. The Arab Emirates in Bagratid Armenia. Translated by Garsoïan, Nina. Lisbon: Livraria Bertrand.
