= Muhammad of Layzan =

Muhammad ibn Yazid
- Shah of Layzan
- Reign: ?–917
- Predecessor: Yazid ibn Khalid
- Successor: Abu Tahir Yazid
- Died: c. 917
- House: Yazidids
- Dynasty: Shirvanshah
- Father: Yazid ibn Khalid

Muhammad was second Shah of Layzan whose father was first Layzanshah Yazid ibn Khalid, a member of junior branch of Yazidids. He was nephew of first independent Shirvanshah Haytham I.

Nothing about his reign is known in sources except for that his "rule lasted a long time, his prestige grew and his affairs prospered". He was thought to be a Shirvanshah earlier because of a confusing note left by al-Masudi who mentioned that it was Muhammad ibn Yazid that annexed principalities of Khursān (lands south to Derbent) and Vardān (north of Quba). According to Vladimir Minorsky, this confusion is a result of both father and son of Abu Tahir Yazid having same name.

Muhammad of Layzan was clearly from a different branch and not Shirvanshah and probably died c. 917.

== Sources ==
- Minorsky, Vladimir (1958). A History of Sharvān and Darband in the 10th-11th Centuries. Cambridge: W. Heffer & Sons, Ltd.

Muhammad of Layzan Yazidids Born: ? Died: 917
Regnal titles
Preceded by Yazid b. Khalid	Layzanshah ?–917	Succeeded by Abu Tahir Yazid
