= Abu Tahir Yazid =

Shirvanshah
- Reign: 917 – September 948
- Predecessor: Ali I
- Successor: Muhammad II

Layzanshah
- Reign: ? – 918
- Predecessor: Muhammad of Layzan
- Successor: Muhammad ibn Yazid
- Died: September 948
- Issue: Muhammad; Ahmad
- House: Yazidids
- Father: Muhammad ibn Yazid
- Religion: Islam

Abu Tahir Yazid ibn Muhammad (Arabic: أبو طاهر يزيد بن محمد; died September 948), also called Yazid I, was the Shirvanshah from 917 until his death, and before that the Layzanshah. By seizing Shirvan from his kinsman Ali ibn Haytham he united the two principalities under a single ruler and transferred the Shirvanshah's throne from the house of Haytham ibn Khalid to that of Haytham's brother Yazid, from whom his own line descended. He founded the town of Yazidiya, later Shamakhi, and reigned for about thirty-three years.

== Reign ==
Abu Tahir was the son of Muhammad ibn Yazid, lord of Layzan, and a great-great-grandson of Yazid ibn Mazyad al-Shaybani; the chronicle gives his descent as Abu Tahir Yazid ibn Muhammad ibn Yazid ibn Khalid ibn Yazid ibn Mazyad al-Shaybani.

The Shirvanshah Ali ibn Haytham had been weakened by a disastrous expedition against Shandan, in which he was captured together with Muhammad I of Derbent and ten thousand men, and by a great Rus raid on the Caspian coasts. Vladimir Minorsky considered that it was the loss of prestige from these repeated defeats that brought about his fall. In 305 AH (917/918 CE) Abu Tahir, described by the chronicle as a cousin of an older generation, attacked him at Marzuqiya and captured him with his son Abbas and his grandson Abu-Bakr; Ali and Abbas were put to death and Abu-Bakr escaped. In the chronicler's phrase, fortune left the house of Haytham and passed to the house of his brother Yazid.

Abu Tahir occupied Shirvan in 305 AH (917/918 CE) and in 306 AH (918/919 CE) founded the town of Yazidiya in the country of Shirvan, granting Layzan as a fief to one of his two sons, Muhammad. Sara Ashurbeyli observed that archaeological work has shown Yazidiya to stand on the site of an older settlement, and suggested that Abu Tahir completed and fortified an existing town and named it after himself.

In 320 AH (932/933 CE) Muflih, a former slave of Yusuf ibn Abi'l-Saj who had himself governed Azerbaijan, fled to Abu Tahir for protection from Balduya, the amir of Azerbaijan. To avoid trouble the Shirvanshah arrested him and handed him over. Minorsky noted that Muflih's coinage shows a gap between 320 AH (932/933 CE) and 323 AH (934/935 CE) into which the flight and extradition fit, and that the identity of Balduya is otherwise unknown.

Some time afterwards the Daylamites entered Shirvan, and Abu Tahir was compelled to make peace with the people of Derbent and ask for their help. He restored to them everything he had taken from them at Shabaran and in the villages, together with the dues from the oil-wells and the salt-marshes; with their assistance he drove the Daylamites out of his country and then made peace with them. He further agreed with the people of Derbent to raid the Byzantines, the Georgians and the other non-Muslim kings. Minorsky regarded the initial expulsion of the Daylamites from Shirvan as a fact not previously known, thought the settlement that followed may have included a clause on the payment of tribute, and considered that the object of the joint raiding agreement was probably restricted to the Kura basin, since Daylamite attacks on Armenia began only later.

Derbent was ruled at this period by the Hashimids, and Abu Tahir's reign saw repeated Shirvanian intervention there. In October 930 a battle was fought at the gate of Shabaran between his son Muhammad, then governing Layzan, and the emir of Derbent Abd al-Malik ibn Hashim, without a decisive result.

In 333 AH (944/945 CE) the people of Derbent recognised Abu Tahir as their ruler and he sent them his son Ahmad as his deputy. Ibn Miskawayh records that the Derbentis had risen against their emir Ahmad, the son of Abd al-Malik, expelled him and invited the Shirvanshah; that Abu Tahir sent his son Ahmad, to whom they swore allegiance as emir; and that after a time they drove him out and restored the Hashimid, whereupon Abu Tahir raided and plundered the countryside of Derbent.

The chronicle's two chapters disagree about this episode. The chapter on Derbent places it in 330 AH (941/942 CE) and has "the Shirvanshah Muhammad ibn Yazid" send his brother Ahmad ibn Yazid. Minorsky rejected that version: both Abu Tahir's father and his son bore the name Muhammad ibn Yazid, no ruler of that name is likely to have been reigning at that date, and if Muhammad ibn Abu Tahir Yazid acceded only in 337 AH (948/949 CE) he could not have made the appointment. He concluded that only Abu Tahir can have sent Ahmad, and that Ahmad was his son rather than his brother. He noted that al-Mas'udi, writing in 332 AH (943/944 CE), likewise calls the reigning Shirvanshah Muhammad ibn Yazid and credits him with uniting Layzan, Shirvan, Khursan and Vardan — an attribution Minorsky suspected of being a later gloss.

== Death and succession ==
Abu Tahir Yazid died in Rabi I 337, September 948, after a reign of about thirty-three years. He was succeeded by his son Muhammad, who had held Layzan as a fief since 918. Relations between Muhammad and his brother Ahmad were bad, at least from 337 AH (948/949 CE) onwards; Ahmad was imprisoned by his brother and later killed.

== Sources ==
- Ashurbeyli, Sara (2007). Şirvanşahlar dövləti [The State of the Shirvanshahs] (in Azerbaijani) (4th ed.). Baku.
- Ibn Miskawayh (1909). The Tajārib al-umam, or History of Ibn Miskawayh. E. J. W. Gibb Memorial Series. Vol. VII. Leiden.
- Madelung, Wilferd (1975). "The minor dynasties of northern Iran". In Frye, R. N. (ed.). The Cambridge History of Iran, Volume 4: From the Arab Invasion to the Saljuqs. Cambridge: Cambridge University Press. pp. 198–249. ISBN 978-0-521-20093-6.
- Minorsky, Vladimir (1958). A History of Sharvān and Darband in the 10th-11th Centuries. Cambridge: W. Heffer & Sons.

Preceded by Muhammad of Layzan	Layzanshah ?–918	Succeeded by Muhammad ibn Yazid
Preceded by Ali I	Shirvanshah; 917–948	Succeeded by Muhammad II
