= Zeyvə, Ismailli =

Zeyvə
- Municipality
- Location within Azerbaijan
- Coordinates: 40°45′N 48°24′E
- Country: Azerbaijan
- Rayon: Ismailli

Population
  - Total: 1,003
- Time zone: UTC+4 (AZT)
  - Summer (DST): UTC+5 (AZT)

Zeyvə is a village and municipality in the Ismailli Rayon of Azerbaijan. It has a population of 1,003. The municipality consists of the villages of Zeyvə, Xankəndi, and Kürdüvan.
