= Garachay =

- Native name: Qaraçay (Azerbaijani)

Location
- Country: Azerbaijan

Physical characteristics
- Mouth: Turyan
  - coordinates: 40.7902°N 47.6101°E

Basin features
- Progression: Turyan→ Kura→ Caspian Sea

The Garachay (Azerbaijani: Qaraçay) is a river in Quba district of Azerbaijan. It flows through the western end of an ancient city of Qabala. In the suburbs of Qabala, it joins other small rivers Hamzali, Mirazabeyli and Gojalan. It flows into the Turyan near the village Savalan.It originates from the northern slopes of the eastern part of the Greater Caucasus Range, near the peak of Babadag and eventually flows into the Caspian Sea.

== See also ==
- Rivers and lakes in Azerbaijan
- Nature of Azerbaijan
