= Xankəndi, Ismailli =

Khankendi
- Azerbaijani: Xankəndi
- Location within Azerbaijan
- Coordinates: 40°45′51″N 48°24′17″E
- Country: Azerbaijan
- District: Ismailli
- Municipality: Zeyvə
- Time zone: UTC+4 (AZT)
  - Summer (DST): UTC+5 (AZT)

Xankəndi (also, Khankendi) is a village in the Ismailli District of Azerbaijan. The village forms part of the municipality of Zeyvə.
