= Muhammad I of Shirvan =

Muhammad I
- Shah of Shirvan
- Predecessor: Haytham I
- Successor: Haytham II
- House: Yazidids
- Dynasty: Shirvanshah
- Father: Haytham b. Khalid

Muhammad ibn Haytham or Muhammad I (Arabic: محمد) was second shah of Shirvan after death of his father Haytham b. Khalid. Information about him is minimal. He was described as a person "who carried on his father’s tradition of justice and war against the infidel" and as someone who has left "exalted memories". He was succeeded by his son Haytham II.

== Sources ==
- Minorsky, Vladimir (1958). A History of Sharvān and Darband in the 10th-11th Centuries. Cambridge: W. Heffer & Sons, Ltd.

Muhammad I of Shirvan House of Shirvanshah Born: ? Died: ?
Regnal titles
Preceded by Haytham b. Khalid	Shirvanshah ?–?	Succeeded by Haytham b. Muhammed
