= Turyan =

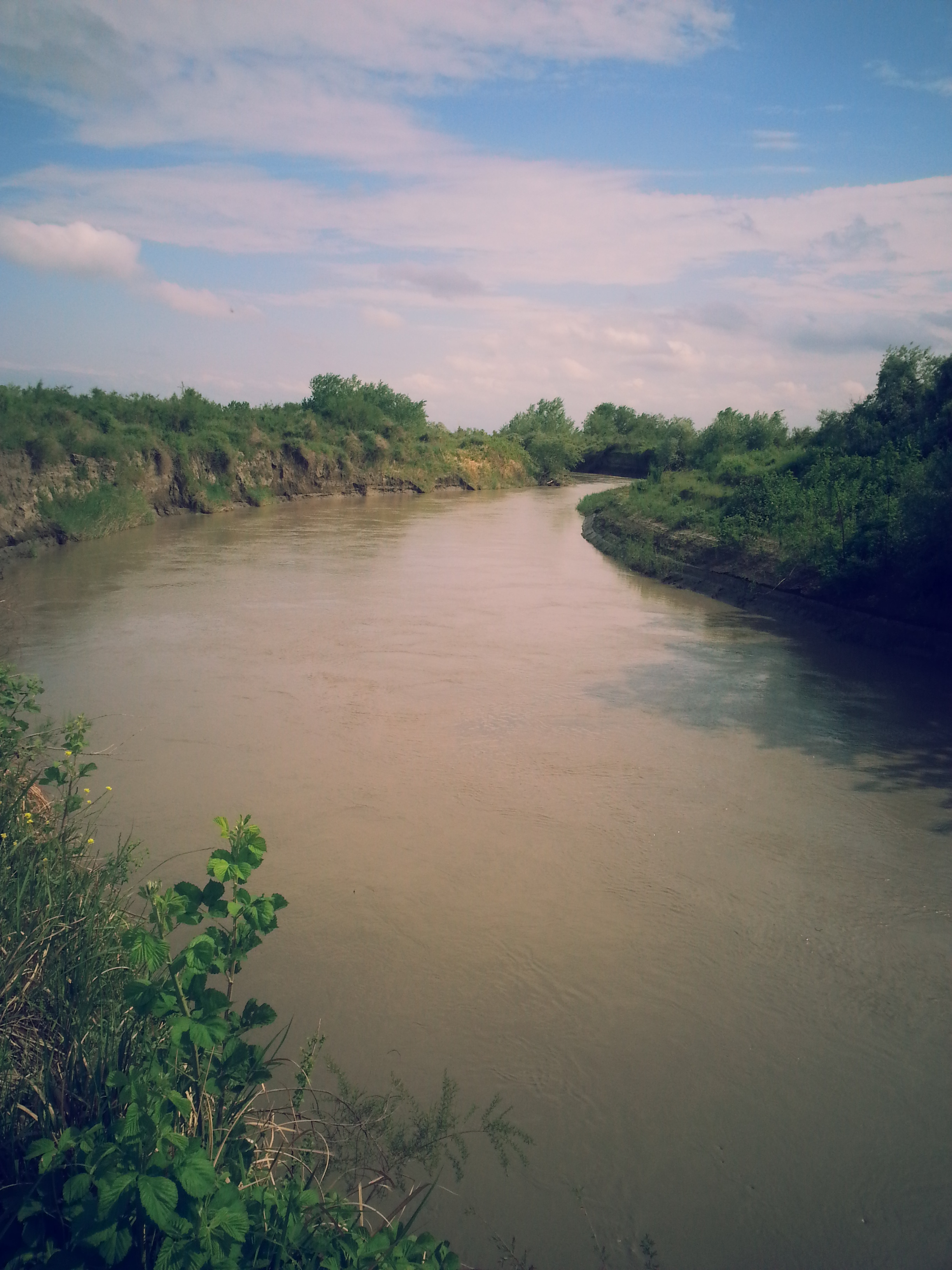
- Native name: Türyançay (Azerbaijani)

Location
- Country: Azerbaijan

Physical characteristics
- Mouth: Kura
  - coordinates: 40.3644°N 47.4376°E
- Length: 180 km (110 mi)
- Basin size: 1,840 km^{2} (710 sq mi)

Basin features
- Progression: Kura→ Caspian Sea
- Tributaries
  - left: Garachay

The Turyan (Azerbaijani: Türyan), also called Turyanchay (Azerbaijani: Türyançay) is a river of Azerbaijan. It flows through Qabala and Goychay raions. It is 180 km (110 mi) long, and has a 1,840 km^{2} (710 sq mi) drainage basin.

== Overview ==
The Turyanchay starts off at Ragdan peak which is located on the boundary of Qabala and Oguz raions, in Saral range at 3,680 meters above sea level. The river then branches off into Tikanli, Gara and Bum rivers down to Nij village, thus playing an important role in the agricultural development of the area. The river ends its stream by flowing into the Kura river. The water from the Turyanchay is also used for irrigation in Agdash and Goychay raions through the artificially built water canals. In 2002, the river overflowed, causing flooding of a major highway. Since then, the regional administration built stone concrete dams on the banks of four major rivers of Qabala raion in 2007. The Turyanchay dam is 300 meters long.

== Statistics ==
The length of the Turyanchay river is 180 km. The basin of the river is 1,840 m^{3}. The average annual water consumption of the Turyanchay is 18 m^{3}/s and annual flow volume is 565 million cubic meters.

The river is mostly fed by snow and glacier water. In the periods from March to July, the river gets richer due to warmer season. By August, the volume of the water in the river decreases.
