= Muhammad III of Shirvan =

Muhammad III

Shirvanshah
- Reign: June 981 – November 991
- Predecessor: Ahmad
- Successor: Yazid II
- Died: November 991; Shamakhi
- House: House of Shirvanshah
- Father: Ahmad

Muhammad III was the Shirvanshah from 981 to 991. He was the son and successor of Ahmad (r. 956–981).

== Reign ==
In 981/82, Muhammad III took the town of Qabala from its ruler, Abd al-Barr ibn Anbasa. In 982, he took control of Barda'a, and made Musa ibn Ali his lieutenant. In 983, a wall around the town of Shabaran was constructed under his orders. In 989/90, the inhabitants of the town of al-Bab became enthusiastic supporters of Muhammad al-Tuzi, a preacher who had arrived from Gilan. The latter soon took over the entire town, and fell into disfavour with its ruler, Maymun. The supporters of al-Tuzi laid siege to the castle of Maymun, forcing him to flee to Tabarsaran in 990/91.

Muhammad III was subsequently invited by al-Tuzi to take control over al-Bab. He went to the town, staying there for some months and overseeing its administration. He was eventually taken back to Shirvan by his men after suffering a head injury from a battle-axe by Balid, a ghulam of Maymun, who subsequently reconquered al-Bab. Muhammad III died in November 991 and was succeeded by his brother Yazid II.

== Coinage and culture ==
A coin struck under Muhammad III at Barda'a is engraved with the nasab ibn as-Sallar, which demonstrates that Muhammad III wanted to make it clear that he was the rightful heir of the Persian monarchs. "Sallar" is derived from sardar, a military title under the Sasanian Empire (224–651).

== Sources ==
- Akopyan, Alexander; Vardanyan, Aram (2009). "A donative dirham of the Shirwānshāh Muhammad ibn Ahmad (AH 370-81) struck in Barda'a in AH 373 (982/3)". Numismatic Chronicle: 261–267.
- Bosworth, C. E. (2011). "Šervānšāhs". Encyclopaedia Iranica.
- Madelung, Wilferd (1975). "Minor dynasties of northern Iran". In Frye, Richard N. (ed.). The Cambridge History of Iran: From the Arab Invasion to the Saljuqs. Vol. 4. Cambridge: Cambridge University Press. pp. 198–250. ISBN 0-521-20093-8.
- Minorsky, Vladimir (1958). A History of Sharvān and Darband in the 10th-11th Centuries. Cambridge: W. Heffer & Sons, Ltd.

Muhammad III of Shirvan Yazidids Died: November 991
Regnal titles
Preceded by Ahmad	Shirvanshah; June 981 – November 991	Succeeded by Yazid II
