= Haytham ibn Khalid =

Haytham I
- Shirvanshah
- Reign: 861 – unknown
- Predecessor: (position established)
- Successor: Muhammad I
- House: Yazidids
- Father: Khalid ibn Yazid al-Shaybani

Haytham ibn Khalid (Arabic: هيثم بن خالد), known as Haytham I, was the first independent Shirvanshah, ruler of Shirvan. A member of the Shaybanid family that had governed Arminiya for the Abbasid Caliphate, he held Shirvan as its lord and bore the title of Shirvanshah, and after the murder of the caliph al-Mutawakkil in 861 he and his heirs ruled as de facto independent emirs. His descendants held Shirvan in hereditary succession as the Mazyadid or Yazidid dynasty, which endured until 1027.

== Background ==
Haytham was the son of Khalid ibn Yazid al-Shaybani and the grandson of Yazid ibn Mazyad al-Shaybani, both of whom served the Abbasid Caliphate as governors of Arminiya, a vast province encompassing most of the Transcaucasus, including Armenia, Iberia and Albania.

The family's position in Shirvan rested on a settlement policy begun two generations earlier. According to al-Ya'qubi, Yazid ibn Mazyad settled so many Arabs of the Rabi'a in Arminiya during the first period of his administration in 787–788 that they came to form a majority of the population. Aram Ter-Ghevondyan judged that these colonies were established not so much in Armenia as in Shirvan, where Yazid's successors founded their hereditary principality in the 9th century. Yazid's son Muhammad, appointed in 802/3, ruled from the fortress of Shamakhi in Shirvan and fortified himself there, so that the eastern part of Albania became his hereditary domain; another son, Khalid – Haytham's father – was named governor of Arminiya on four occasions, and died and was buried at Dvin.

Haytham's elder brother Muhammad ibn Khalid succeeded their father, governed Arminiya three times and ruled from Ganja in Arran; he was the last Shaybanid emir to hold the governorship of Arminiya, being driven from Armenia by Ashot in 878. While Muhammad held Arran, Shirvan was governed by Haytham.

== Reign ==
Ter-Ghewondyan notes that Haytham, as lord of Shirvan, had already assumed the title of Shirvanshah – a Persian style of pre-Islamic origin – before the decline of Arab domination. According to the Ta'rikh Bab al-abwab, preserved by Münejjim Bashi, disturbances broke out after the murder of the caliph al-Mutawakkil in 247/861, and Haytham made himself independent in Shirvan; he became known as Shirvanshah, and at the same time his brother Yazid ibn Khalid became independent in Layzan and was styled Layzanshah. The adoption of these Persian royal titles by an Arab family marks the beginning of the Persianization of the Yazidids. Azerbaijani historiography holds that Haytham probably put an end to the rule of the Shirvanshah previously appointed by the Arabs, making him the first Muslim ruler of Shirvan of the Arab-descended Mazyadid line to bear the title.

Little else is recorded of him. The chronicle states that he fought the infidels of the country of Sarir, the Christian kingdom to the north of Shirvan, and that he died in a year the manuscript leaves blank; his castle stood near the gate called al-Khass, and the ward where it stood was known as mahallat al-Qasr. Ashurbeyli infers from the silence of the sources that his reign was short. He was succeeded by his son Muhammad.

== The house of Haytham ==
Haytham's line held Shirvan for four generations. According to the Ta'rikh Bab al-abwab, his son Muhammad continued his father's "tradition of justice and holy war" (ghazw wa jihad) "against the infidel and left an exalted memory in those parts". Muhammad's son Haytham led numerous expeditions against the Christians and converted several villages into pious foundations (waqf), their harvest collected in granaries he built in his capital and the grain then distributed among the needy of the Marches of al-Bab and among the ghazis; he was charitable, just and zealous in fighting, and lived long.

He was followed by his son Ali ibn Haytham, under whom the fortunes of the house collapsed. Ali agreed with the amir of al-Bab to attack the infidels of Shandan, and a large number of volunteers and Qur'an readers rallied to them; but at the pass of Shandan a battle took place which went badly for the Muslims. Ali and the amir of al-Bab were taken prisoner together with 10,000 Muslims, whom the victors divided among the people of Shandan, the Sarir and the Khazars. Those who fell to the men of Shandan were freed three months later without ransom, and Ali and the amir were also released and sent back to their countries, but those who had become captives of the Khazars were sold, and only a few escaped. The chronicle dates the disaster to 912, though elsewhere it gives 909.

Ali remained ruler until 917, when he was opposed by a kinsman of an older generation, Abu-Tahir Yazid ibn Muhammad, the lord of Layzan and a descendant of Haytham's brother Yazid. Weakened by his captivity and by the loss of most of his men, Ali was taken by surprise and captured, together with his son Abbas and his grandson Abu-Bakr; all were killed at Marzuqiya except Abu-Bakr, who escaped. In the chronicler's phrase, fortune (ni'ma) thereupon left the house of Haytham and was transferred to the house of his brother Yazid. Abu-Tahir Yazid occupied Shirvan in 305/917 and in 306/918 founded the town of Yazidiya – later Shamakhi – in the country of Shirvan, granting Layzan as a fief to one of his own sons.

The Yazidid line thus continued through the Layzan branch, ruling Shirvan as independent emirs until 1027, when it was succeeded there by the Kasranids.

== Sources ==
- Ashurbeyli, Sara (2007). Şirvanşahlar dövləti [The State of the Shirvanshahs] (in Azerbaijani) (4th ed.). Baku.
- Madelung, W. (1975). "The Minor Dynasties of Northern Iran". In Frye, Richard N. (ed.). The Cambridge History of Iran: From the Arab Invasion to the Saljuqs. Vol. 4. Cambridge: Cambridge University Press. pp. 198–249. ISBN 0-521-20093-8.
- Minorsky, Vladimir (1958). A History of Sharvān and Darband in the 10th-11th Centuries. Cambridge: W. Heffer & Sons, Ltd.
- Ter-Ghewondyan, Aram (1976). The Arab Emirates in Bagratid Armenia. Translated by Garsoïan, Nina G. Lisbon: Livraria Bertrand.

Haytham ibn Khalid Mazyadid dynasty
Regnal titles
New title Secession from the Abbasid Caliphate	Shirvanshah; 861–unknown	Succeeded by Muhammad I
