= Umar of Derbent =

Umar ibn Hashim

Emir of Derbent
- Reign: 884 – 885
- Predecessor: Hashim of Derbent
- Successor: Muhammad I of Derbent
- Died: 885
- Issue: Maymun (?)
- House: Hashimids
- Father: Hashim of Derbent
- Religion: Islam

Umar ibn Hashim (Arabic: عمر بن هاشم; died 885) was the second Hashimid emir of Derbent, ruling for about a year between 884 and 885. He was the eldest son of Hashim ibn Suraqa, the founder of the dynasty, and was succeeded by his brother Muhammad.

The Ta'rikh Bab al-abwab, which is the only source for his reign, records simply that he followed in his father's steps, acted with justice and behaved well, and that he died in 272 AH (885/886 CE) after ruling about one year. Under the year 302 AH (914/915 CE), in the reign of Umar's brother Muhammad, the chronicle records the death of Maymun ibn Amr ibn Hashim, described as the son of the ruling emir's brother. Whether this Amr is Umar under a variant of the name (the two are distinguished in Arabic only by a final letter and are readily confused) or a fourth son of Hashim who never ruled is not stated.

== Sources ==
- Minorsky, Vladimir (1958). A History of Sharvān and Darband in the 10th-11th Centuries. Cambridge: W. Heffer & Sons.

Preceded by Hashim of Derbent	Emir of Derbent; 884–885	Succeeded by Muhammad I of Derbent
