= Ali I of Shirvan =

Ali I

Shirvanshah
- Reign: c. 900s – 917
- Predecessor: Haytham II
- Successor: Yazid I
- Died: 917; Marzuqiya
- Issue: Abbas
- House: Yazidids
- Father: Haytham II
- Religion: Islam

Ali ibn Haytham (Arabic: علي بن هيثم; died 917), known as Ali I, was the Shirvanshah until 917. The son of Haytham ibn Muhammad, he is remembered chiefly for two catastrophes: a joint expedition with the emir of Derbent against Shandan in which both rulers and ten thousand Muslims were taken captive, and the great Rus raid on the Caspian coasts recorded by al-Mas'udi. He was killed in 917 by his kinsman Abu Tahir Yazid, the lord of Layzan, who thereby united the two principalities and transferred the Shirvanshah's throne from the house of Haytham to that of his brother Yazid.

== The Shandan expedition ==
Ali made an agreement with the emir of Derbent, Muhammad ibn Hashim, to attack the non-Muslims of Shandan, in the mountains of present-day Dagestan. A large number of volunteers and Qur'an readers (qurra) from elsewhere rallied to them, but when they reached the pass of Shandan the battle went against the Muslims. Ali and the emir were taken prisoner together with ten thousand men, whom the victors divided among the people of Shandan, Sarir and the Khazars. Those who fell into the hands of the men of Sarir were released three months later without ransom, and Ali and the emir were also freed and sent back to their countries; but the captives held by the Khazars and by the people of Shandan were sold, and only a few escaped. The chronicle adds that among the non-Muslims of the frontier the people of Shandan were the most implacable enemies of the Muslims of Derbent.

The chronicle dates the battle to 300 AH (912/913 CE) in its chapter on Shirvan and to 297 AH (909/910 CE) in its chapter on Derbent. Sara Ashurbeyli places it in 309 AH (921/922 CE).

== The Rus raid ==
Al-Mas'udi records that at some point after 300 AH (912/913 CE) the Rus came with about five hundred ships, each carrying a hundred men. Reaching the Khazar guard-posts at the mouth of the channel, they undertook to give the Khazar khagan half of whatever plunder they took from the peoples around the sea, and were allowed to pass through his country to the Volga and down to its mouth on the Caspian Sea. Their ships then scattered across the sea and raided Gilan, Daylam, Tabaristan, Abaskun on the Gurgan shore, the naphtha-bearing district and the lands towards Azerbaijan. The peoples of the coast were thrown into confusion, for they had never before seen an enemy come against them from the sea, which had carried only merchant and fishing vessels.

The Rus fought the men of Gilan and Daylam and one of the commanders of Ibn Abi'l-Saj before reaching the naphtha-bearing shore of the kingdom of Shirvan known as Bakuh (Baku). On their return they took shelter on islands a few miles offshore. The population made ready, boarded their boats and rowed out to the islands; the Rus came out to meet them, and thousands of Muslims were killed or drowned.

The inhabitants of southern Azerbaijan, Arran, Baylaqan, the district of Barda and other towns, together with those of Daylam, Gilan and Tabaristan, took to flight, having expected no attack from the sea. The Rus remained on the Caspian for several months, during which no coastal people could travel from one country to another. Having taken great plunder they returned to Khazar territory, where they were attacked by the Muslims; some thirty thousand were killed and only about five thousand escaped home.

== Death ==
Vladimir Minorsky considered that Ali's downfall followed from the loss of prestige brought by these repeated defeats. In 305 AH (917/918 CE) he was challenged by a kinsman, Abu Tahir Yazid, the lord of Layzan, whom the chronicle describes as a cousin of an older generation. Weakened by his captivity and by the loss of most of his men, Ali was taken by surprise and captured together with his son Abbas and his grandson Abu-Bakr. All were killed at Marzuqiya except Abu-Bakr, who escaped. In the chronicler's phrase, fortune left the house of Haytham and passed to the house of his brother Yazid. Abu Tahir Yazid, until then Layzanshah, thereby united the two principalities and occupied Shirvan in 305 AH (917/918 CE); in 306 AH (918/919 CE) he founded the town of Yazidiya, later Shamakhi, and granted Layzan as a fief to one of his own sons.

== Sources ==
- Ashurbeyli, Sara (2007). Şirvanşahlar dövləti [The State of the Shirvanshahs] (in Azerbaijani) (4th ed.). Baku.
- Minorsky, Vladimir (1958). A History of Sharvān and Darband in the 10th-11th Centuries. Cambridge: W. Heffer & Sons.

Preceded by Haytham II	Shirvanshah ?–917	Succeeded by Yazid I
