= Muhammad I of Derbent =

Muhammad I

Emir of Derbent
- Reign: 885 – 915
- Predecessor: Umar of Derbent
- Successor: Abd al-Malik I
- Died: 915
- Issue: Abu'l-Najm
- House: Hashimids
- Father: Hashim of Derbent
- Religion: Islam

Muhammad ibn Hashim (Arabic: محمد بن هاشم; died 915), known as Muhammad I, was the third Hashimid emir of Derbent, ruling for thirty-one years from 885 until his death. A son of the dynasty's founder Hashim ibn Suraqa, he succeeded his short-lived brother Umar ibn Hashim and spent his long reign campaigning against the non-Muslim powers on Derbent's northern and western frontiers — Shandan, the Khazars and Sarir with mixed success.

== Reign ==
Muhammad succeeded his brother Umar, who had ruled about a year, in 272 AH (885/886 CE). In 273 AH (886/887 CE) he raided the territory of Shandan and conquered the places named in the chronicle as D.nk.s and Sh.l.shli, which belonged to it.

In August 901 the Khazars, under their king K.sa ibn B.ljan al-Khazari, came to attack Derbent. Muhammad fought them with the ghazis of the city, beat them off and defeated them. Minorsky connected the attack with the collapse of a subsidy arrangement on which the city's defence depended: in 270/883 or 272/885 the caliph had assigned to the people of Derbent the revenue of the oil-wells and salt-lakes of the Baku region, with a superintendent appointed to collect the yearly income and distribute it among the warriors of Derbent, but in 290 AH (902/903 CE) a new superintendent appropriated the revenues and seized two villages belonging to Derbent near Shabaran. Deprived of the subventions, the people of Derbent turned to trade and neglected their military duties, which encouraged the Khazars to besiege the town, where they were beaten off under Muhammad's command.

In September 905 Muhammad met Bukht-Yisho I, the lord of Sarir, who captured him by treachery together with ten of the chiefs of Derbent; he afterwards released them, behaved generously towards them and gave them presents.

In 297 AH (909/910 CE) Muhammad joined the Shirvanshah and the Shirvanians in an expedition against Shandan. The Muslims were defeated and both rulers were taken prisoner, though they were later released. The chapter on Shirvan gives a fuller account of what is evidently the same campaign, naming the Shirvanshah as Ali ibn Haytham and dating it to 300 AH (912/913 CE): the two rulers had agreed to attack Shandan and were joined by volunteers and Qur'an readers from elsewhere, but were defeated at the pass and captured along with ten thousand men, who were divided among the people of Shandan, Sarir and the Khazars. Those held by Sarir were freed after three months without ransom, as were the two rulers, while the captives of the Khazars and of Shandan were sold.

He died in 303 AH (915/916 CE) after a reign of thirty-one years. He was succeeded in 916 by his brother Abd al-Malik, the third of Hashim's sons to rule, with whose accession, Minorsky noted, quarrels began within the family as Muhammad's son Abu'l-Najm started a civil war against him.

== Historiography ==
The account of Muhammad's reign comes from the Ta'rikh Bab al-abwab, an anonymous history of Derbent compiled about 1106 and preserved in quotations by the 17th-century Ottoman compiler Münejjim Bashi. Minorsky considered that the text of the older Ta'rikh al-Bab begins with the account of Muhammad's father, and that the author, favourable to the Hashimids, tends to pass over what is discreditable to them. Some of the same events are recorded in the Darband-nama, whose notice of the Baku oil-well revenues Minorsky thought belonged to the original unabridged text of the chronicle.

== Sources ==
- Minorsky, Vladimir (1958). A History of Sharvān and Darband in the 10th-11th Centuries. Cambridge: W. Heffer & Sons.

Preceded by Umar of Derbent	Emir of Derbent; 885–915	Succeeded by Abd al-Malik I
