= Qabala =

Qabala Qəbələ
- City and municipality
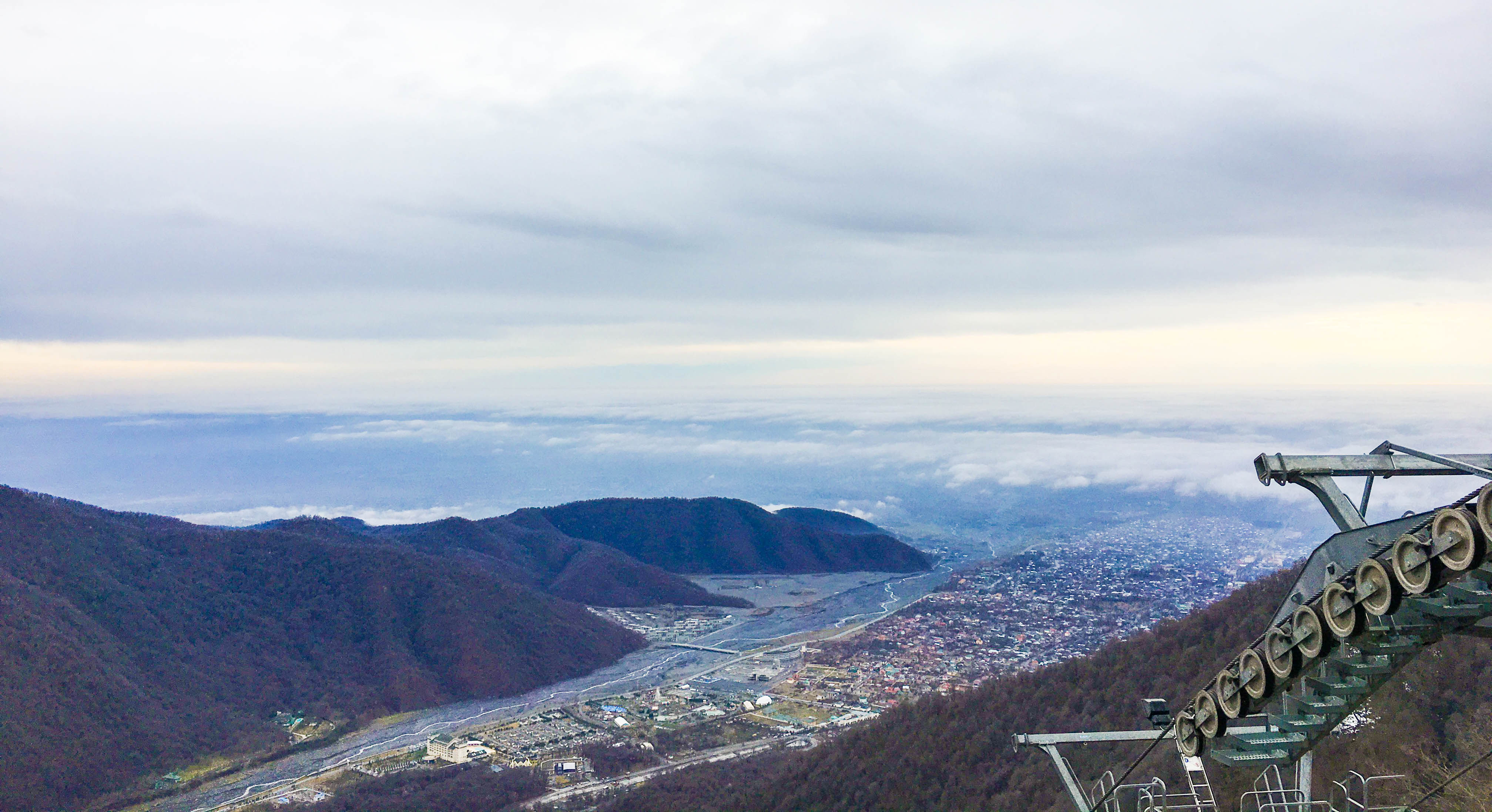

- Location within Azerbaijan Location within Shaki-Zagatala Economic Region
- Coordinates: 40°58′53″N 47°50′45″E
- Country: Azerbaijan
- District: Qabala
- Established: 1537

Area
  - Total: 1,548 km^{2} (598 sq mi)
- Elevation: 783 m (2,569 ft)

Population (2011)
  - Total: 12,808
- Time zone: UTC+4 (AZT)
- Area code: +994 160
- Climate: Cfa
- Website: www.qebele-ih.gov.az

Qabala (Azerbaijani: Qəbələ) is a city and the administrative centre of the Qabala District of Azerbaijan. The municipality consists of the city of Gabala and the village of Küsnat. Before the city was known as Kutkashen, but after the Republic of Azerbaijan's independence, the town was renamed in honour of the much older city of Gabala, the former capital of Caucasian Albania, the archaeological site of which is about 20 km southwest.

== History ==
=== Antiquity ===
Gabala was once the ancient capital of Caucasian Albania. Archaeological evidence indicates that the city functioned as the capital of Caucasian Albania as early as the 4th century BC. There are the ruins of the ancient city and the main gate of Caucasian Albania. Ongoing excavations near the village of Chukhur show that Gabala from the 4th – 3rd centuries BC and up to the 18th century was one of the main cities with developed trade and crafts. The ruins of the ancient town are situated 15 km from the regional centre, allocated on the territory between the Garachay and Jourluchay rivers.

Gabala was on the Silk Road, and was mentioned by Pliny the Younger as "Cabalaca", Greek geographer Ptolemy as "Khabala", Armenian geographer Anania Shirakatsi as "Kavalak", and 9th century historian al-Baladhuri as "al-Khazar". Until occupation by Shirvanshahs, it was ruled by a local Caucasian Albanian family, whose last known member was Abd al-Barr ibn Anbasa.

=== Medieval era ===
Gabala was occupied by Shirvanshah Fariburz, King David IV of Georgia in 1120; Turco-Mongol conqueror Timurleng in 1386; and Safavid shah Tahmasib I in 1538, Afshar Nader Shah in 1734 but was able to preserve its culture and identity. After the death of Nader Shah in 1747, the region split into independent khanates and sultanates, and Gabala was known as the Qutqashen Sultanate. It was also called Gabala Mahali until it was absorbed into the Sheki Khanate. In 1823, after the Russo-Persian War (1804-1813), Azerbaijan was annexed from the Persian Empire by the Russian Empire of 1813. In 1841 the khanates of the region were terminated, and the territories were incorporated into Russian governorates. The Gabala area was added to the Elisabethpol Governorate. Due to archaeological finds in Gabala, it was declared a National State Reserve in 1985.

== Geography ==
The geographical position and mountainous relief of the city greatly influenced the formation of complex climate conditions in the vertical droughty area, as well as the density of the river network and richness of soil-vegetation cover. Relief and humid climate conditions of the Gabala region led to the formation of a thick river network in the area. The rivers of the city refer to the left branches of the Kura basin and run directly into the Kura or the rivers of the Shirvan zone.

== Culture ==
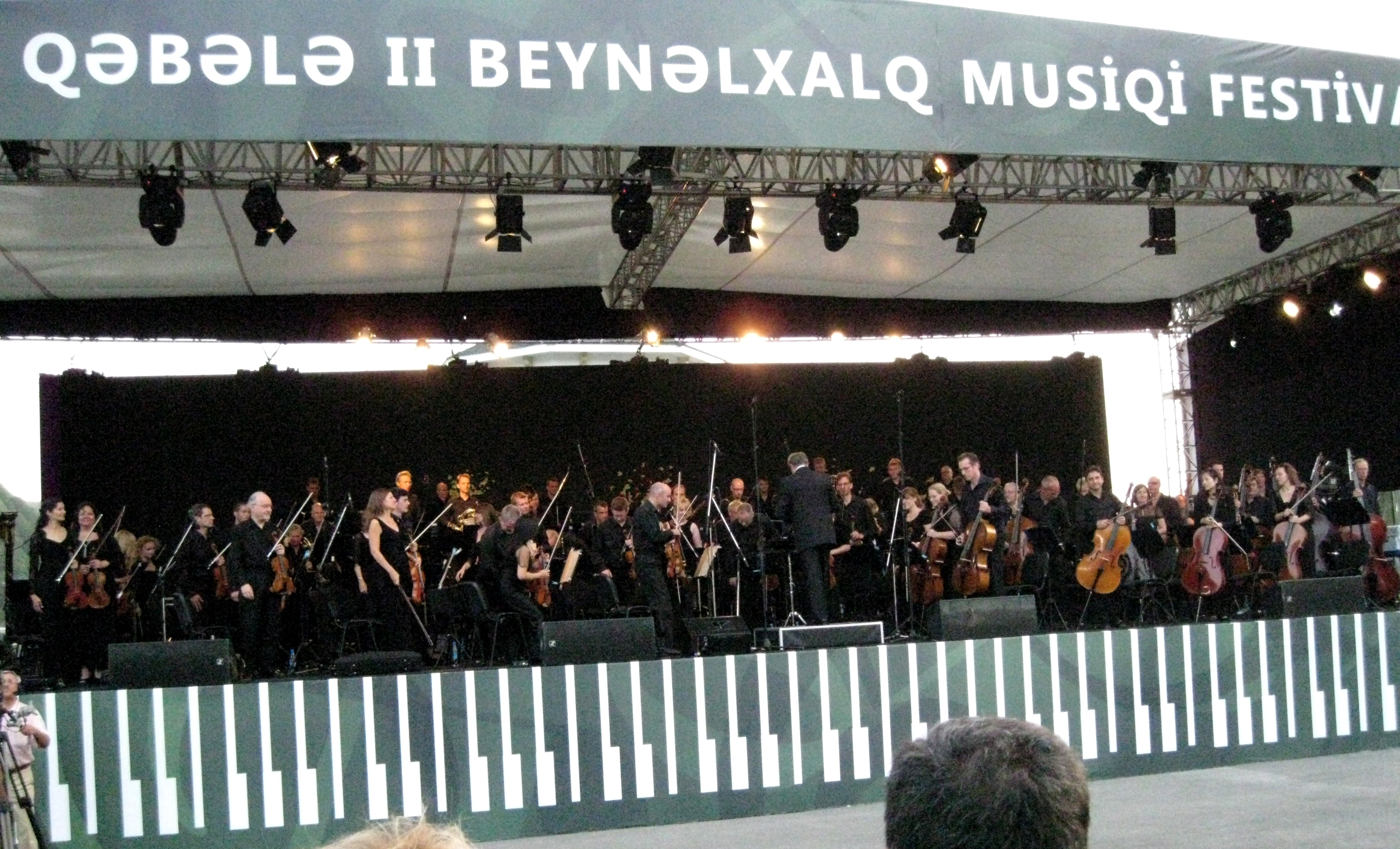
Gabala International Music Festival

Since 2009 the city has been the site of the Gabala International Music Festival, which includes classical and jazz performers.

Qabala is known for the ruins of an ancient walled city, Chukhur Gabala, dating back to the 4th century BC.

The city includes "Qabaland", which is the largest amusement park in Azerbaijan.

== Sports ==
The city's professional football team, Gabala, is in the Azerbaijan Premier League and plays its home games in Gabala City Stadium. It was managed by Tony Adams in the 2010–11 season.

== Transport ==
Within the city there are three numbered minibus routes.

Qabala Airport is around 20 kilometres (12 miles) south of the city.

The Baku-Gabala-Baku route is a high-speed rail line in Azerbaijan that connects the capital city of Baku with the city of Gabala. The train is operated by Azerbaijan Railways (ADY).

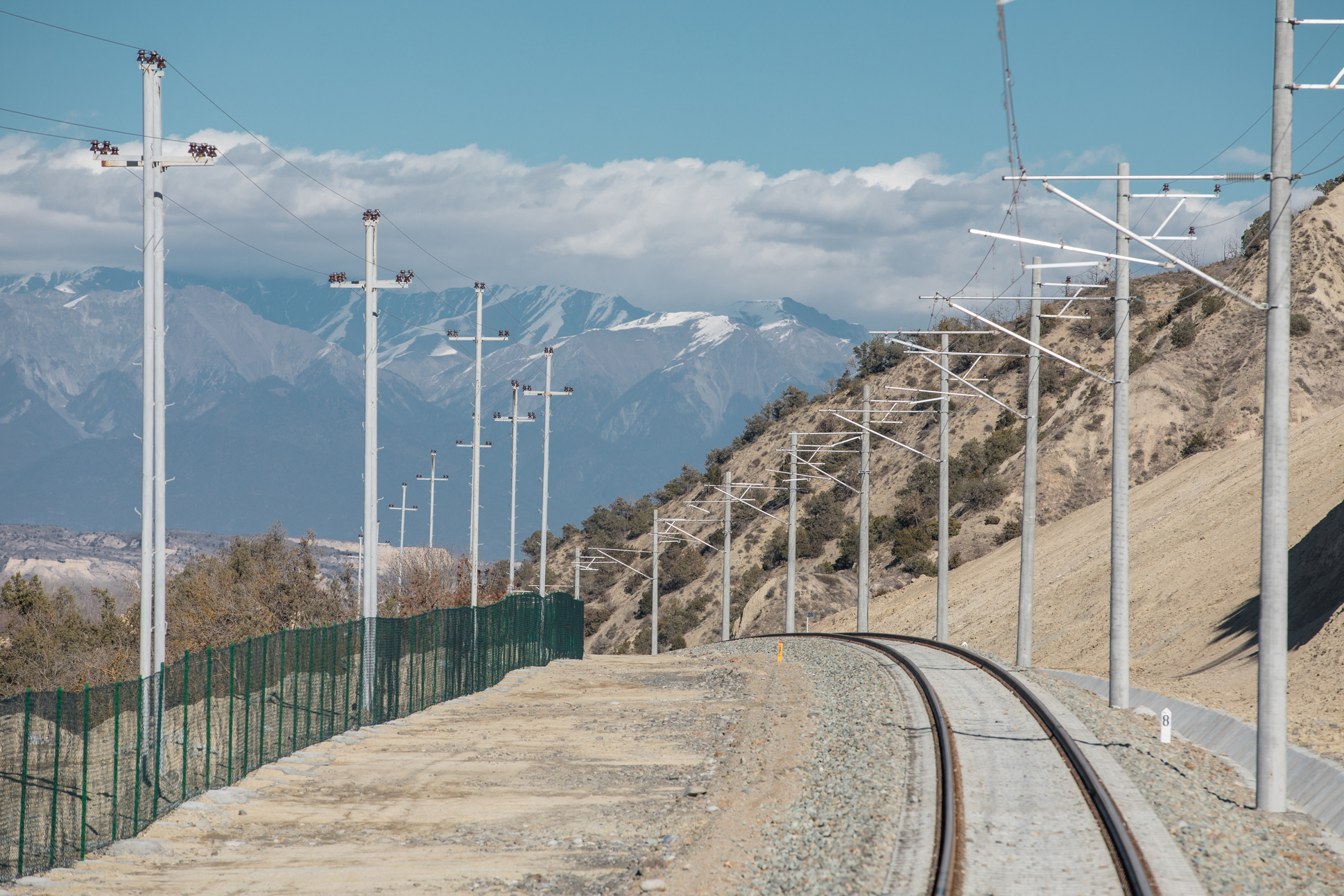
Railway in Qabala

== Climate ==
Qabala has a humid continental climate (Dfa) close to the borderline of the humid subtropical climate (Cfa). The climate of Qabala is warm-temperate with dry winters in low areas, cold and damp in high mountains, and the annual precipitation is 500–600 mm in the south and up to 1600 mm in the northern high mountains.

Climate data for Qabala
Month	Jan	Feb	Mar	Apr	May	Jun	Jul	Aug	Sep	Oct	Nov	Dec	Year
Mean daily maximum °C (°F)	4.4 (39.9)	5.0 (41.0)	9.4 (48.9)	17.3 (63.1)	21.1 (70.0)	26.0 (78.8)	29.5 (85.1)	28.6 (83.5)	24.8 (76.6)	17.4 (63.3)	11.4 (52.5)	7.0 (44.6)	16.8 (62.2)
Daily mean °C (°F)	−0.5 (31.1)	0.1 (32.2)	4.0 (39.2)	10.5 (50.9)	15.6 (60.1)	19.6 (67.3)	21.9 (71.4)	22.3 (72.1)	17.4 (63.3)	11.7 (53.1)	5.9 (42.6)	2.0 (35.6)	10.9 (51.6)
Mean daily minimum °C (°F)	−3.9 (25.0)	−2.8 (27.0)	1.0 (33.8)	6.7 (44.1)	11.2 (52.2)	15.4 (59.7)	18.2 (64.8)	17.4 (63.3)	13.9 (57.0)	8.5 (47.3)	3.0 (37.4)	−1.4 (29.5)	7.3 (45.1)
Average precipitation mm (inches)	43 (1.7)	50 (2.0)	72 (2.8)	73 (2.9)	101 (4.0)	97 (3.8)	53 (2.1)	55 (2.2)	51 (2.0)	102 (4.0)	57 (2.2)	41 (1.6)	795 (31.3)
Average precipitation days	8	8	11	9	11	8	6	4	5	9	8	8	95
Source: NOAA

== Gallery ==
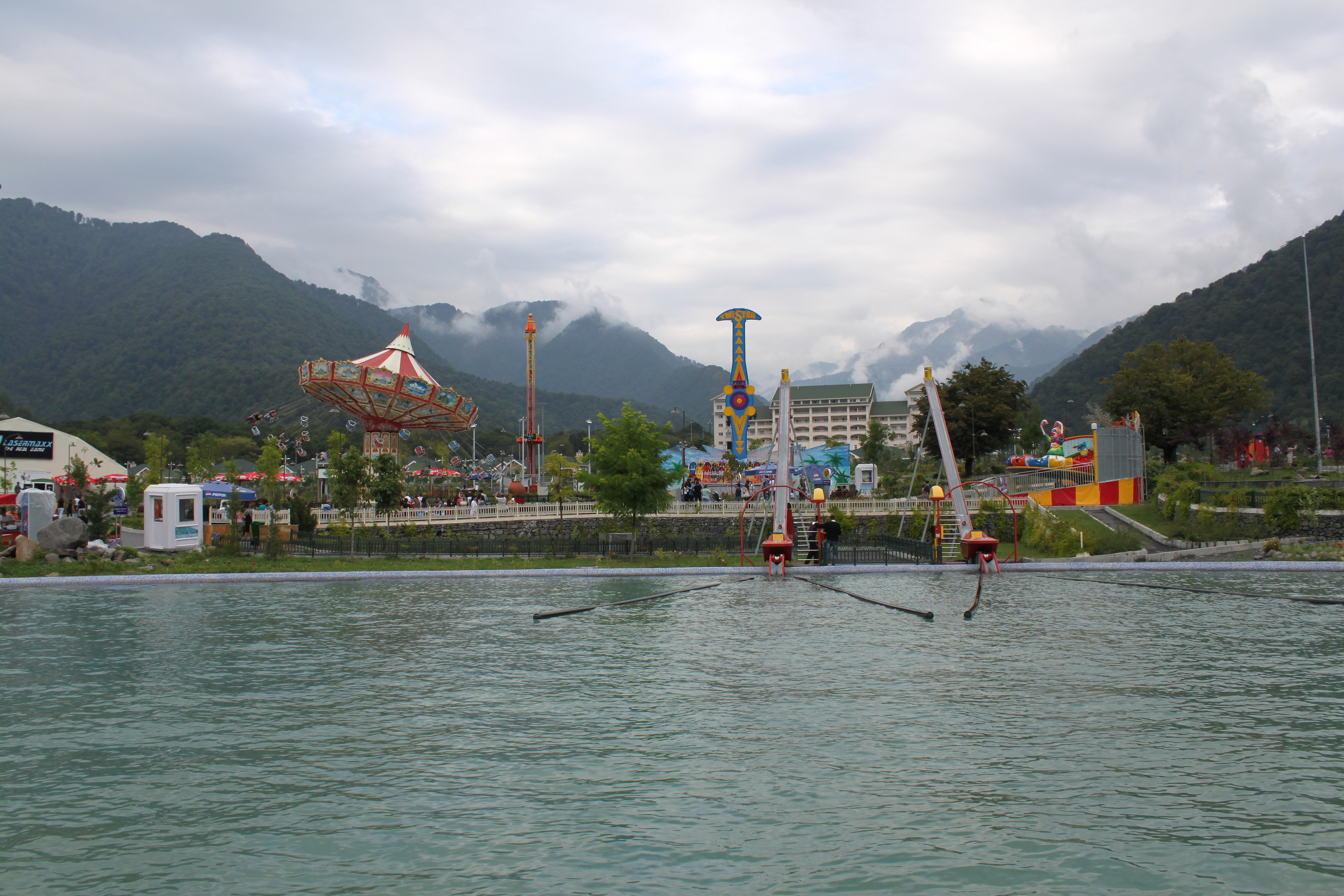
Gabaland amusement park

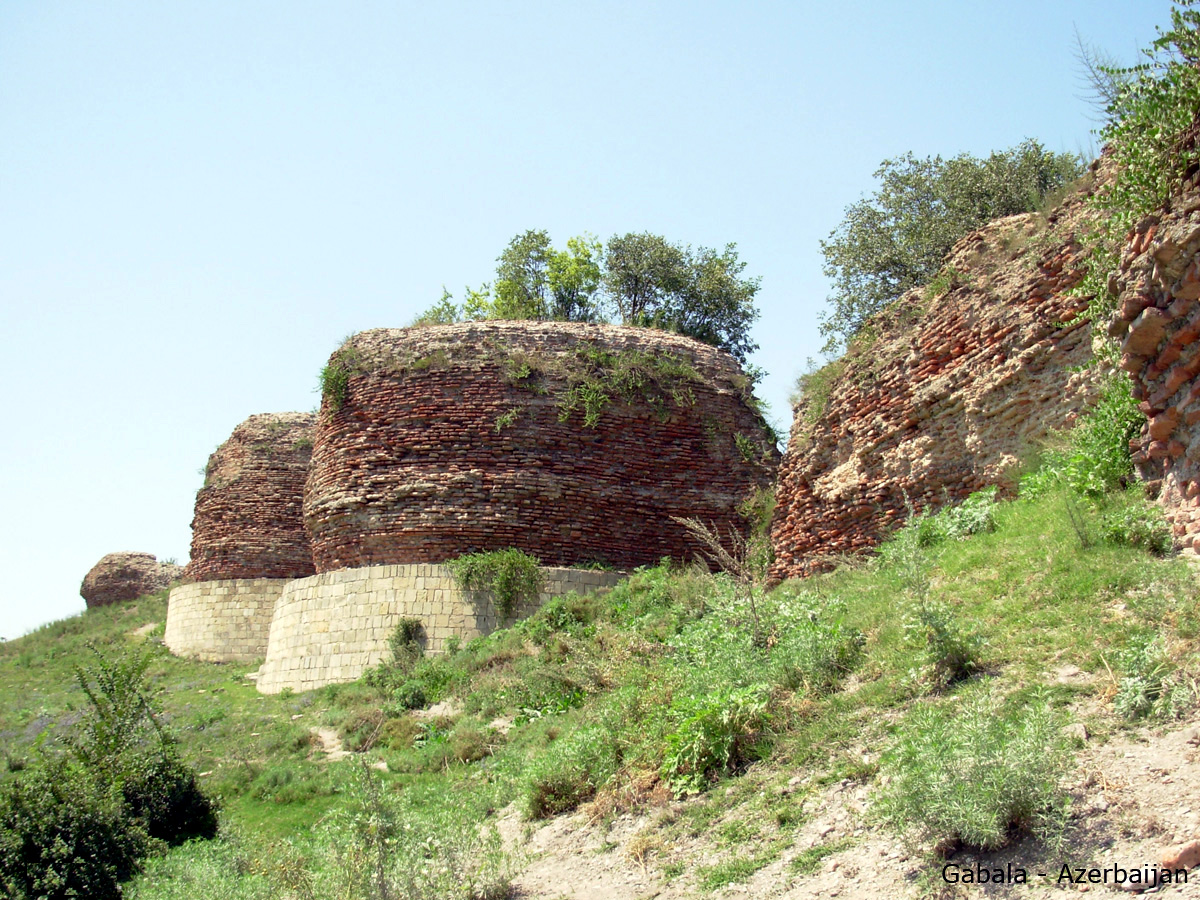
Ancient Qabala fortress

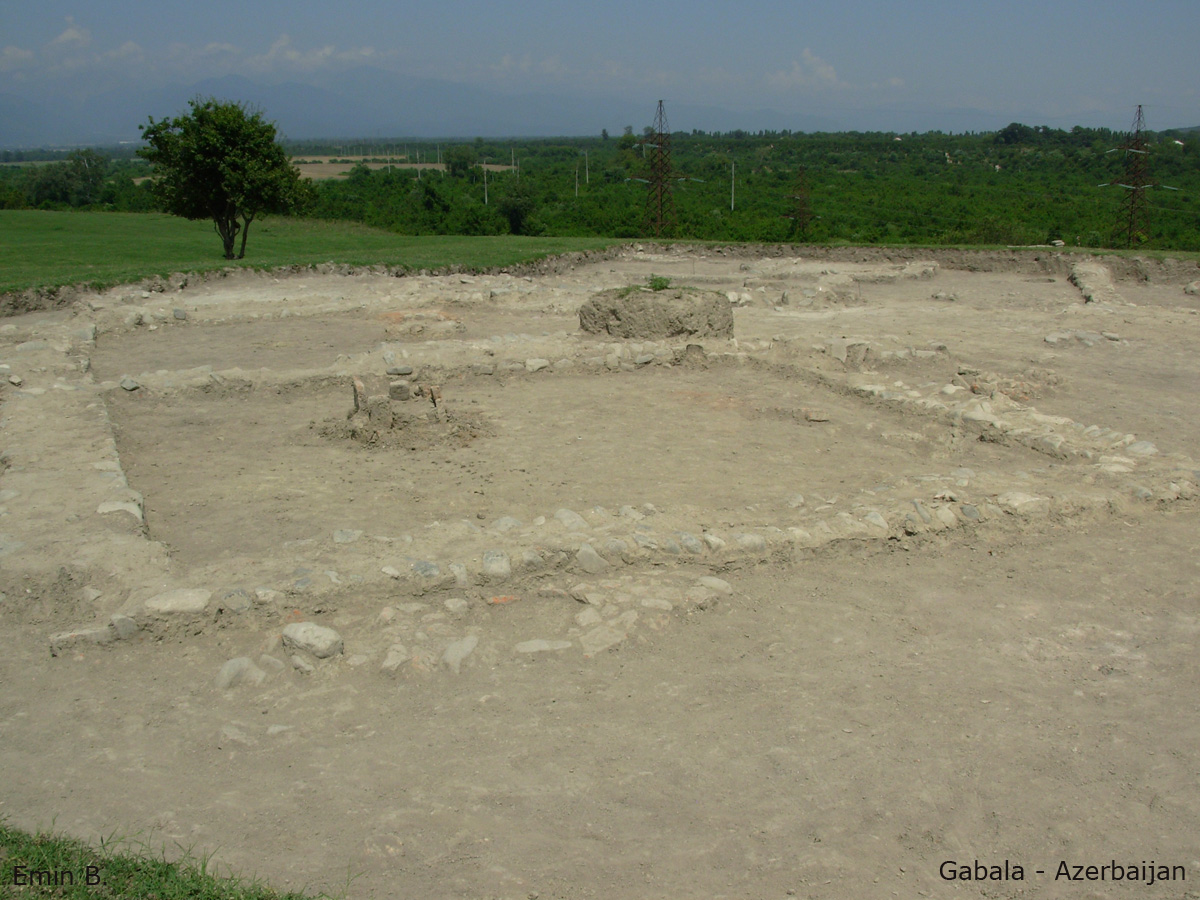
Archeological site of Qabala fortress

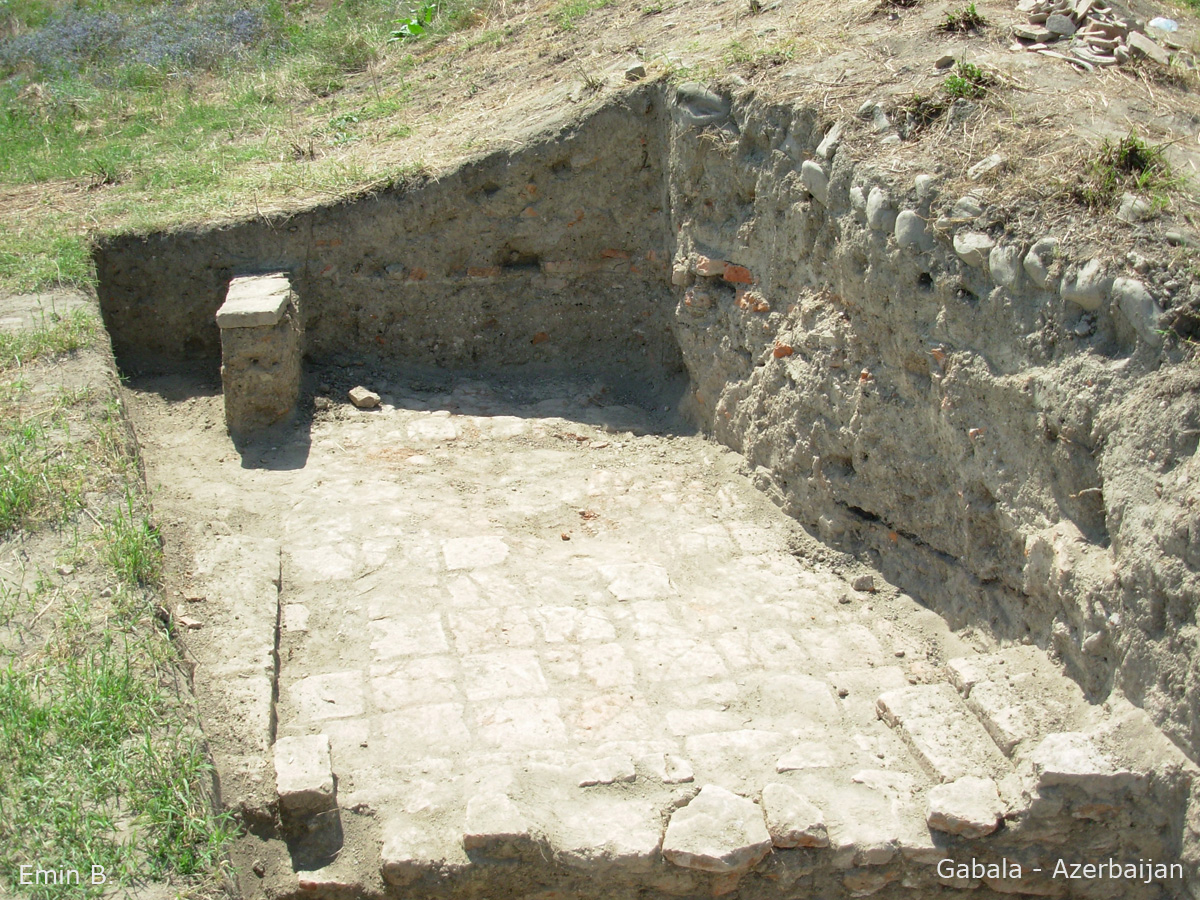
Archeological excavations

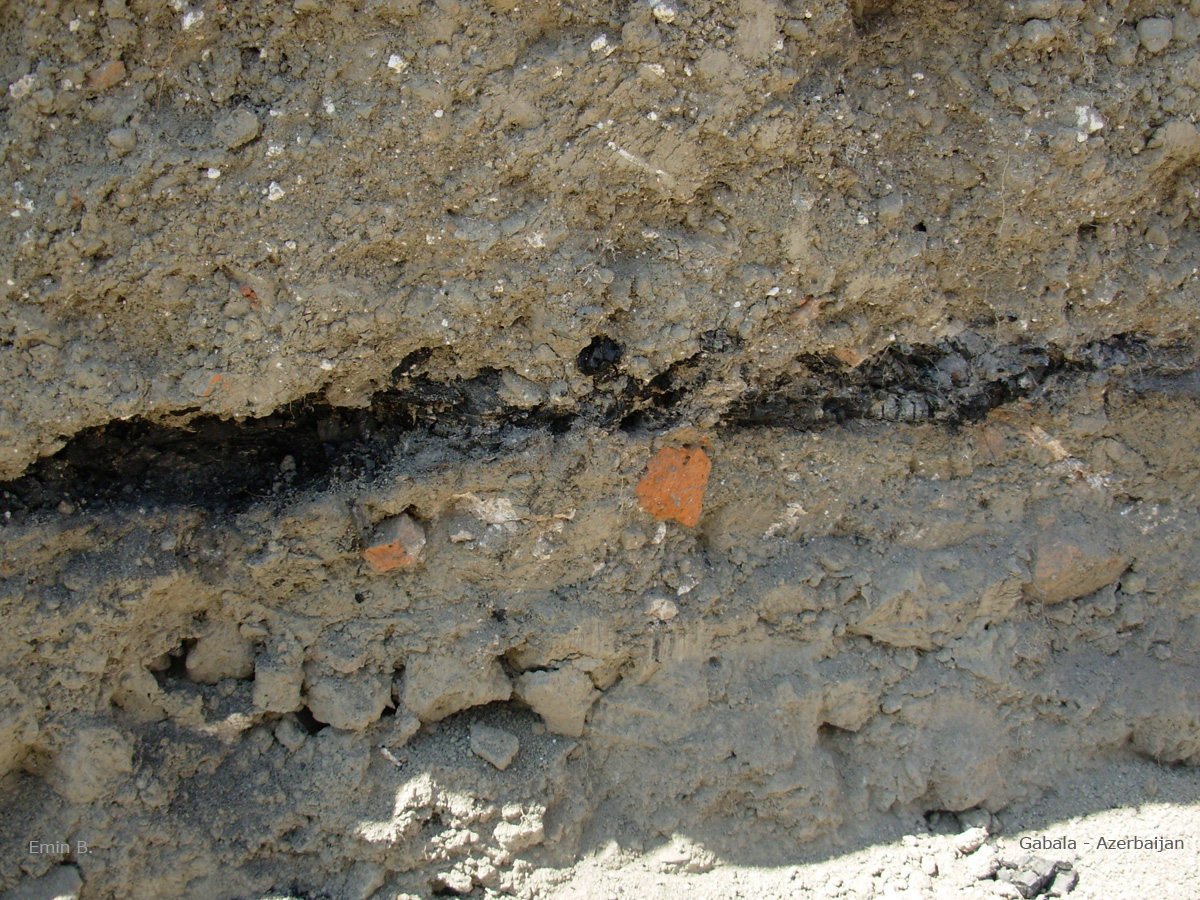
Archeological excavations in Qabala

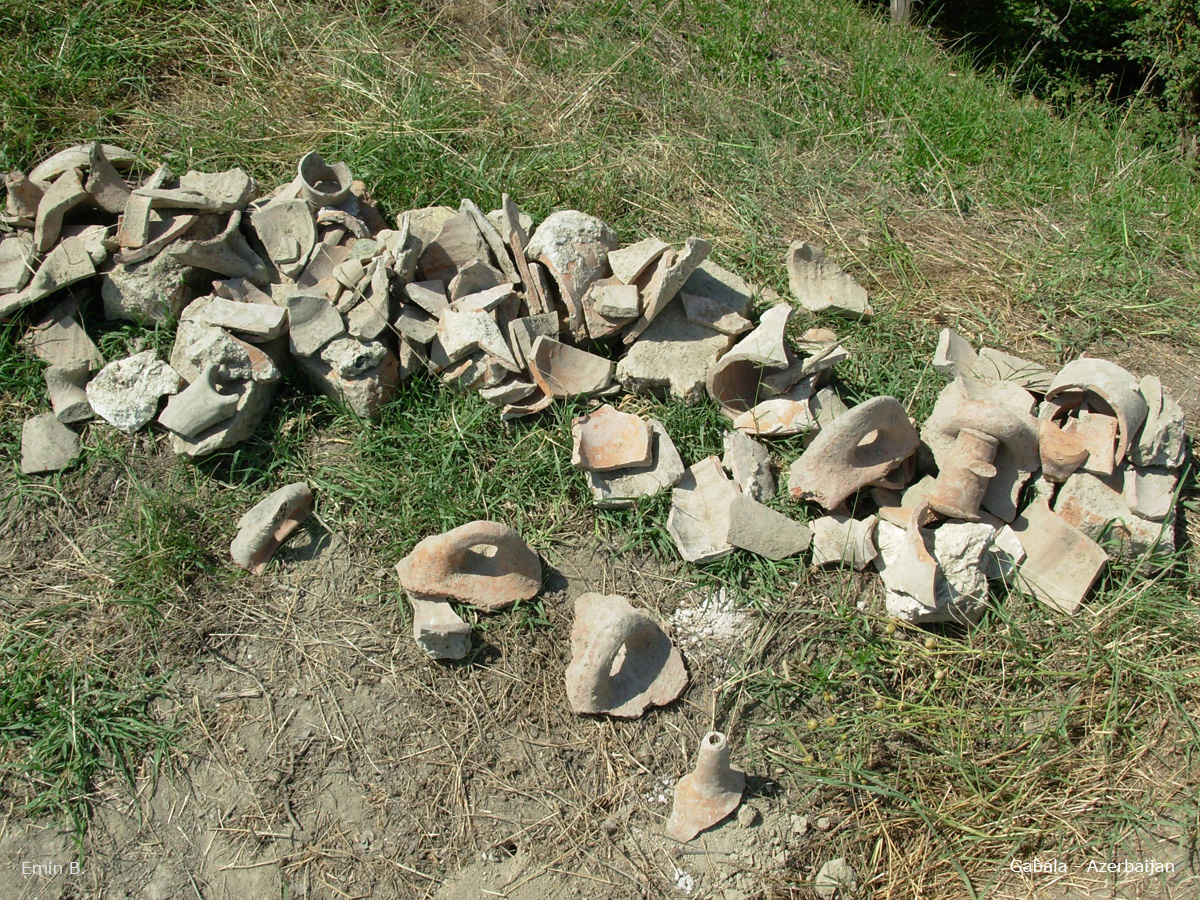
Ceramic finds

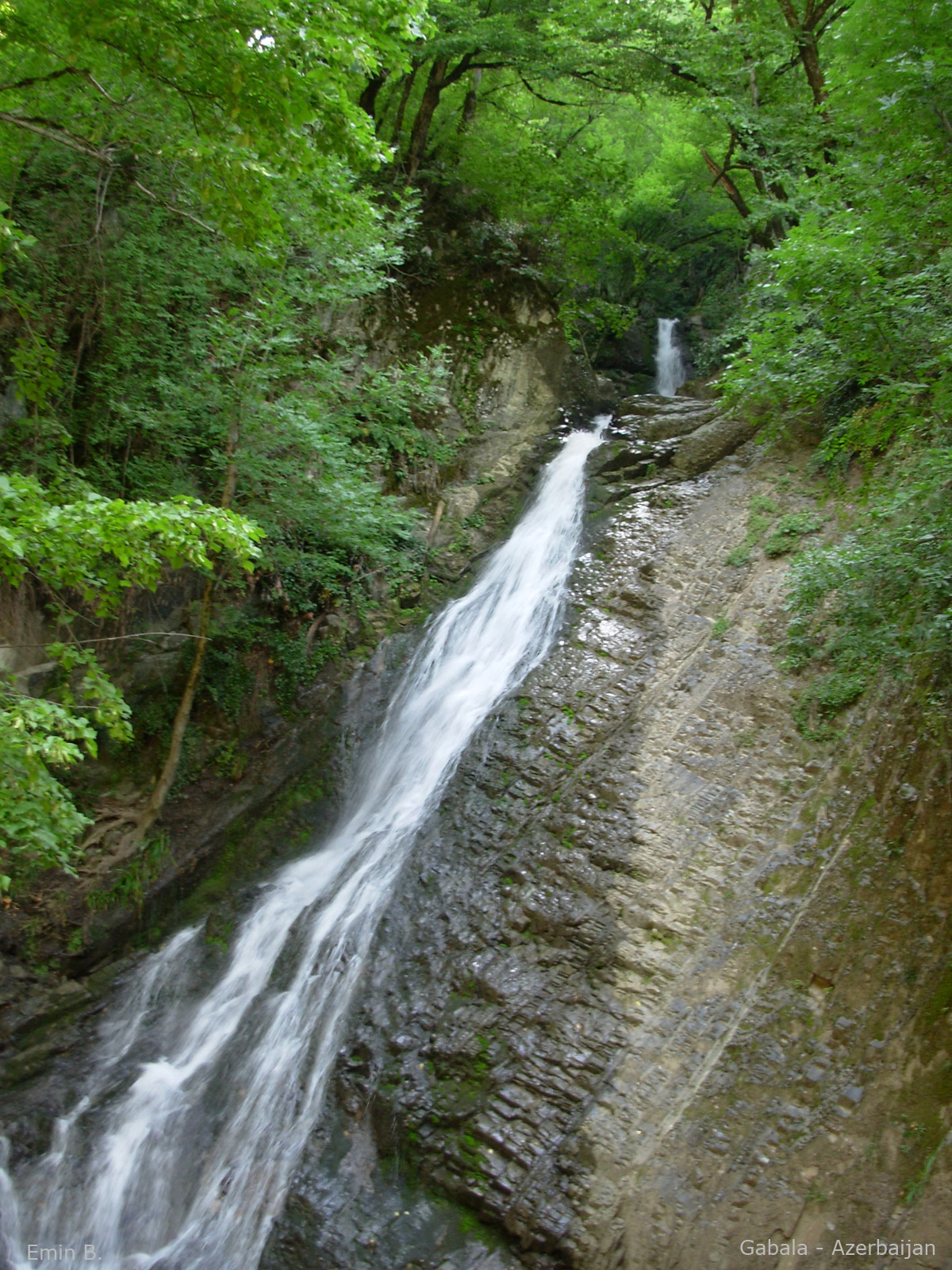
Waterfall in Qabala

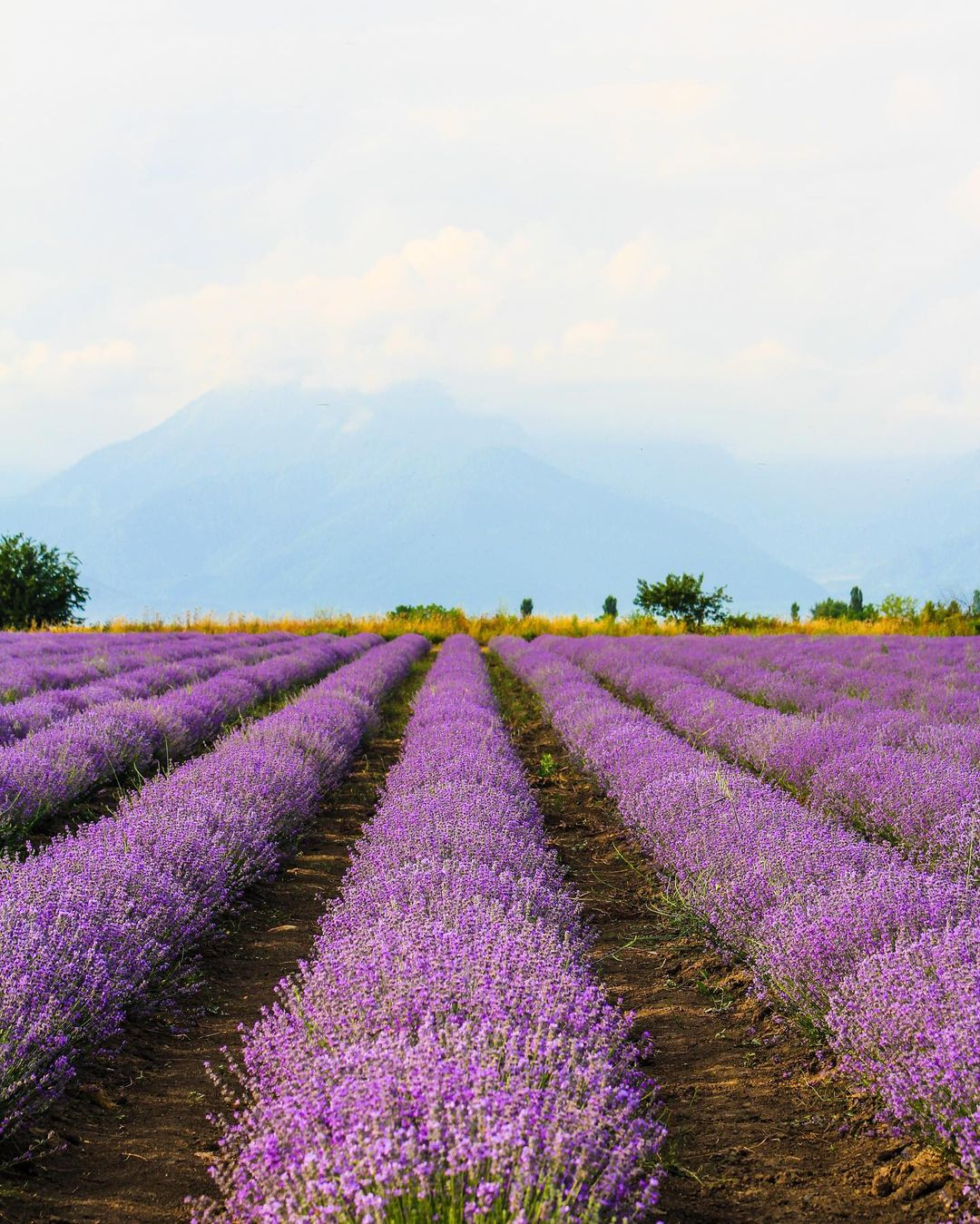
Lavender field

== International relations ==
=== Twin towns – Sister cities ===
Qabala is twinned with

- Gyeongju, South Korea
- Kyrgyzstan, Karakol

== Sources ==
- Minorsky, Vladimir (1958). A History of Sharvān and Darband in the 10th-11th Centuries. Cambridge: W. Heffer & Sons.
