= Haytham II of Shirvan =

Haytham II
- Shah of Shirvan
- Predecessor: Muhammad I
- Successor: Ali I
- House: Yazidids
- Dynasty: Shirvanshah
- Father: Muhammad I

Haytham II (Arabic: هيثم) was the third Shirvanshah after death of his father Muhammad I. Like his father and grandfather he was described as someone "who led numerous expeditions against the infidel". His reign saw Islamization of the region and establishing granaries for the support of newly emerged Emirate of Derbent. According to Vladimir Minorsky, ultimate aim of Haytham could be turning Derbent a dependent vassal. Haytham reportedly lived a long life but no other information about him surfaced.

== Sources ==
- Minorsky, Vladimir (1958). A History of Sharvān and Darband in the 10th-11th Centuries. Cambridge: W. Heffer & Sons, Ltd.

Haytham II of Shirvan Yazidids
Regnal titles
Preceded by Muhammad I	Shirvanshah	Succeeded by Ali I
