= Yazid ibn Mazyad al-Shaybani =

Abbasid General and Governor of Arminiyah

Yazid ibn Mazyad al-Shaybani يزيد بن مزيد الشيباني

Abbasid Governor of Arminiyah
- In office 787–788
- Monarch: Harun al-Rashid
- Preceded by: Yusuf ibn Rashid al-Sulami
- Succeeded by: Ubaydallah ibn al-Mahdi
- In office 799–801
- Monarch: Harun al-Rashid
- Preceded by: Ali ibn Isa ibn Mahan
- Succeeded by: Asad ibn Yazid al-Shaybani

Personal details
- Died: c. 801 Arminiyah, Abbasid Caliphate
- Relations: Muhammad and Haytham (grandson)
- Children: Asad ibn Yazid; Khalid ibn Yazid
- Parent: Mazyad al-Shaybani
- Military career
- Allegiance: Abbasid Caliphate
- Branch: Abbasid army
- Service years: 780s–801
- Rank: General
- Conflicts: Arab–Khazar wars Arab-Byzantine wars

Yazid ibn Mazyad al-Shaybani (Arabic: يزيد بن مزيد الشيباني, romanized: Yazīd ibn Mazyad al-Shaybānī; died 801) was an Arab general and governor who served the Abbasid Caliphate.

== Biography ==
Yazid was member of the Shayban tribe, dominant in the region of Diyar Bakr in the northern Jazira. The first member of his family to rise to prominence was his uncle, Ma'n ibn Za'ida al-Shaybani, under the Umayyads. Although Ma'n fought against the Abbasid Revolution, he reconciled himself with the Abbasid regime and both he and his sons, Za'ida and Sharahil held governorships and high military posts.

Yazid first served under Ma'n during the latter's governorship in Sistan, where Ma'n fell in battle against the local Kharijites in 769. Under Caliph al-Mahdi (r. 775–785), he fought against Yusuf al-Barm in Khurasan, and in 782 took part in the great campaign against the Byzantine Empire under the future Caliph Harun al-Rashid's (r. 786–809). Yazid accompanied al-Mahdi's eldest son and successor al-Hadi (r. 785–786) to his governorship of Jurjan in 783/784. After al-Hadi became Caliph, Yazid supported him in his intention—ultimately cut short by his death—to remove Harun from the succession in favour of al-Hadi's own son.

Yazid's loyalty was rewarded by al-Hadi with his appointment to the governorship (ostikan) of Arminiya (a large province encompassing the whole of Transcaucasia), which he governed until 788/789.In 799, Harun ar-Rashid again appointed Yezid ruler of Armenia, Azerbaijan and Shirvan. His rule was harsh towards the native Christian population, and he carried out large-scale colonization of the province, particularly at Shirvan, with Arab Muslims. He was also the first of a long line of Shaybanid ostikans, beginning with his sons, and hence the progenitor of the Mazyadid dynasty that ruled in Shirvan as autonomous and later independent emirs (Shirvanshahs) until 1027.

After his tenure in Arminiya, Yazid was sent to combat a Kharijite rebellion led by the fellow-Shaybanid al-Walid ibn Tarif (795/796). Yazid succeeded in defeating and killing the rebel leader in battle, ending the uprising. Yazid was re-appointed as ostikan in 799, in time to face the last Khazar attack on the Caliphate's Caucasian provinces, which he defeated. He died in Armenia in 801, and was succeeded by his son Asad.

== Sources ==
- Crone, Patricia (1980). Slaves on Horses: The Evolution of the Islamic Polity (1980 ed.). Cambridge: Cambridge University Press. ISBN 978-0521229616.
- Ter-Ghewondyan, Aram (1976) [1965]. The Arab Emirates in Bagratid Armenia. Translated by Garsoïan, Nina. Lisbon: Livraria Bertrand.

Preceded by Yusuf ibn Rashid al-Sulami	Ostikan of Arminiya; 787–788	Succeeded by Abd al-Qadir
Preceded by Sulayman ibn Yazid	Ostikan of Arminiya; 799–801	Succeeded by Asad ibn Yazid al-Shaybani
