= Kürdüvan =

- Location within Azerbaijan
- Coordinates: 40°45′24″N 48°24′52″E
- Country: Azerbaijan
- Rayon: Ismailli
- Municipality: Zeyvə
- Time zone: UTC+4 (AZT)
  - Summer (DST): UTC+5 (AZT)

Kürdüvan (also, Kyurdevan, Kyurduvan, and Kyurdyuvan) is a village in the Ismailli Rayon of Azerbaijan. The village forms part of the municipality of Zeyvə.
