= Tabasaran Principality =

Sultanate in the 18th and 19th centuries

Tabasaran Maisumate
- 1642–1813
- Map of the Tabasaran Domains in the 18th century
- Status: Principality
- Capital: Khuchni
- Common languages: Tabasaran, Azerbaijani, Lezgian.
- Religion: Islam
- Historical era: Early modern
  - Established: 1642
  - Russian conquest: 1813
Preceded by	Succeeded by
Tabasaran Societies; Lakzan	Russian Empire
- Today part of: Russia

The Tabasaran Principality or Principality of Tabasaran was an independent monarchic state in southern Dagestan, existing from 1642 until the later 19th century. It emerged as one of many smaller states from the disintegration of the Shamkhalate of Gazikumukh in 1642. It was located in the Samur river valley, roughly coinciding with the region in which the Tabasaran people still reside today. Its location close to the main road between Derbent and Shirvan gave it some strategic importance.

The population of the principality was mainly composed of Tabasarans and Lezgins, and minor Caucasian tribes such as Tsakhurs, Rutuls and Aguls. The state was governed by two sovereigns, one of which was called Ghāzī, the other Ma‘ṣūm. It could mobilize an army of 500 cavalrymen.

The independence of the principality came to an end in the course of the Russian conquest of the Caucasus. Today the region is part of the Dagestan Republic within the Russian Federation.

== Literature ==
- Marie Broxup, The North Caucasus Barrier: The Russian Advance Towards the Muslim World, C. Hurst & Co. Publishers, 1996, p. 34
