= Manuchihr III of Shirvan =

Manuchihr III
- Shirvanshah; Khaqan-e Kabir
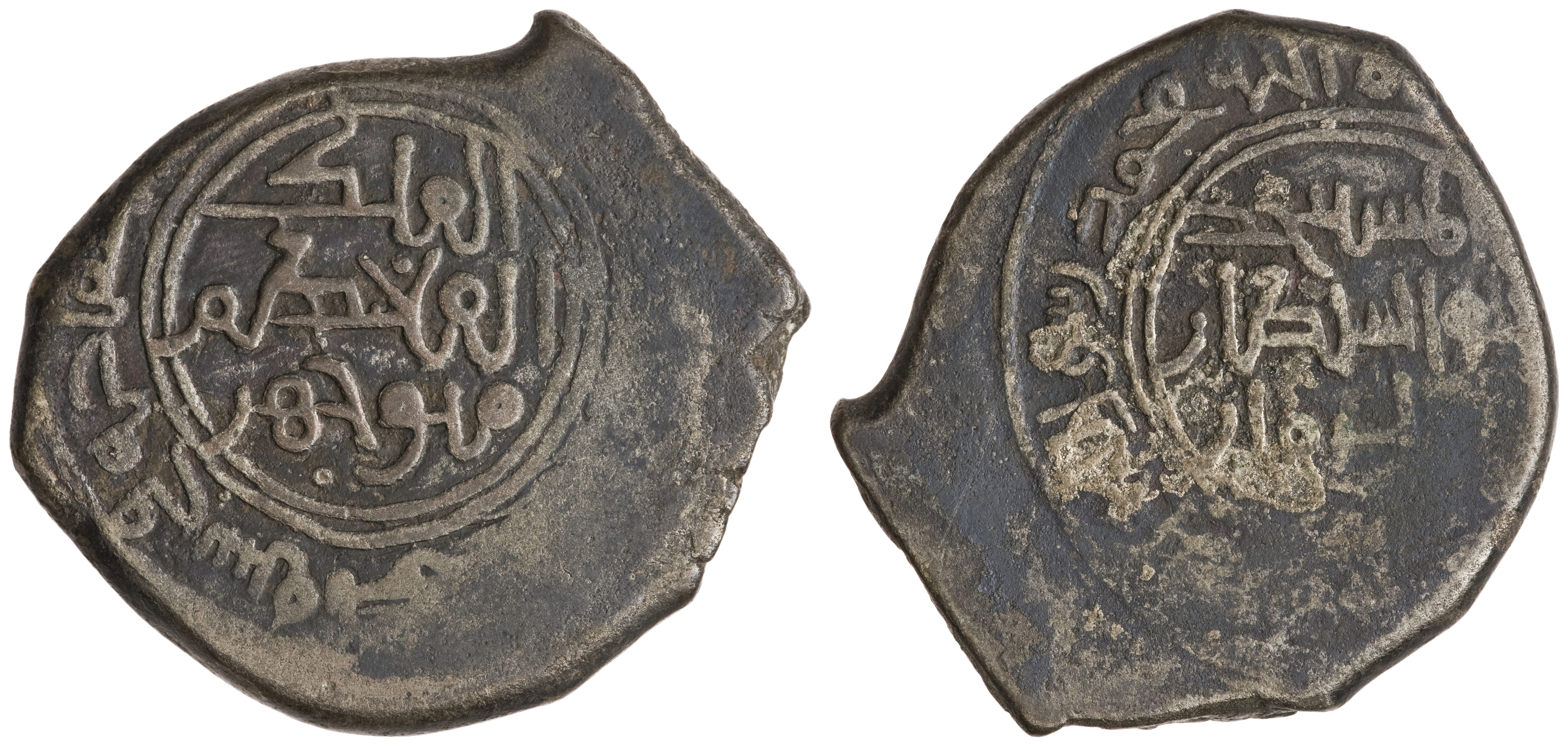
- Coin of Manuchihr III, minted at Shamakhi in 1160

Shirvanshah
- Reign: November 1120 – c. 1160
- Predecessor: Afridun I
- Successor: Akhsitan I
- Vizier: Jamalu’d-Din Abi’l-Nasr Malik Mis‘ar b. ‘Abdu’llah
- Born: 1091–1097
- Died: c. 1160 (aged 68–69)
- Spouse: Tamar
- Issue: Akhsitan I Farrukhzad I Shahanshah; Afridun II; Two unnamed daughters
- Dynasty: Kasranids
- Father: Afridun I
- Religion: Sunni Islam

Manuchihr III (also spelled Minuchihr; Persian: منوچهر, romanized: Manuchehr) was the 19th Shirvanshah from 1120 to sometime after 1160. He was the son and successor of Afridun I (r. 1106–1120).

== Name ==
Although he was described as Manuchihr II by researchers like Hadi Hasan, Vladimir Minorsky and Dickran Kouymjian, he was third person carrying this name, following his uncle Manuchihr II (1096-1106) and great-great-uncle Manuchihr I (1027-1034). During this period in Shirvanshah historiography, the names and family ties of the Shirvanshahs become exceedingly convoluted and uncertain, with the 17th-century Ottoman historian Munejjim-bashi (died 1702) only providing an incomplete of them, starting with Manuchihr, whom he calls "Shah Manuchihr ibn Kasran", Kasran being a version of Kisra. Sources now start referring to the ruling Yazidi family as the "Kasranids" or "Khaqanids". Besides using the title of Shirvanshah, Manuchihr III also used the title of Khaqan-e Kabir ("Great Khan"), which was the inspiration behind the takhallus (pen name) of his eulogist, Khaqani. He described shah's full title as Abul-Hayja Fakhrud-Din Malik Manuchihr b. Afridun. Among other titles, Khaqani also described him as "Naib of Tengri".

== Life ==
=== Under Afridun I ===
He was born between c. 1091-1097. He was married to the Georgian princess Tamar c. 1111. His father Afridun I died in November 1120, paving way for him to be Shirvanshah.

=== Reign ===
Manuchihr broke away from Seljuk suzerainty after Battle of Didgori in 1121, which caused an invasion by Mahmud II in 1123. Seljuk contingent led by Aqsunqur Ahmadili, atabeg of Maragha was defeated by David IV, Manuchihr's father-in-law. Later Mahmud left Shirvan for Hamadan in August, 1123. David even wanted to annex Shirvan but his death 1125 left those plans unfinished. Manuchihr later put down a rebellion by Kipchaks and conquered Arran, using the weakening state of Georgia.

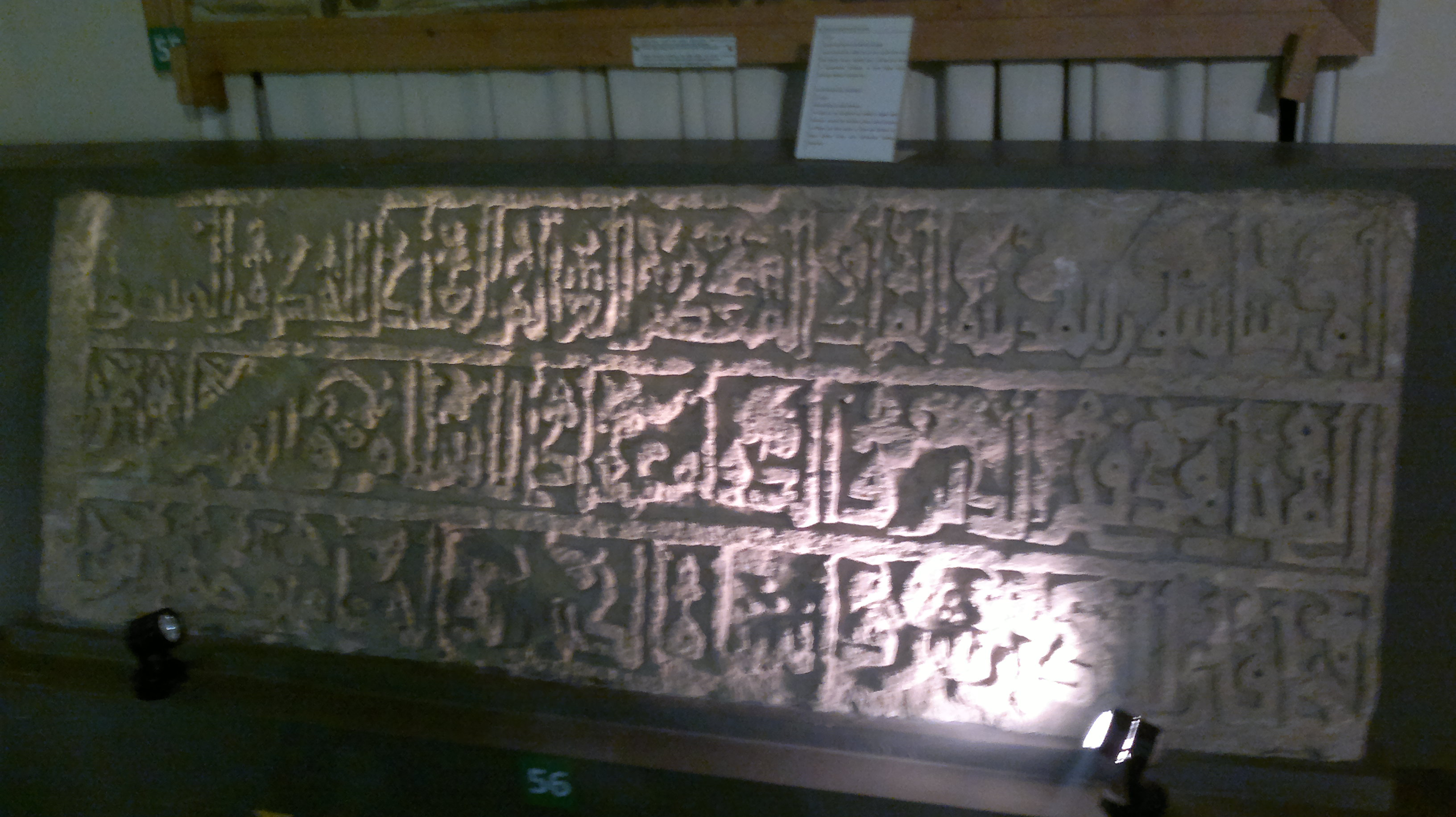
Baku Fortress Wall inscription bearing the name of Manuchihr

He was remembered by Khaqani and Falaki Shirvani to have restored Band-i Baqilan, a dam build on Kura River in 1137/8.

== Court ==
Manuchihr was famous for being a patron of arts. Falaki mentions his vizier Jamaluddin Abil-Nasr Malik Misar b. Abdullah being an important person of the court, as well as his minister Aminuddin Muhammad b. Abduljalil-i Ahrasi being a patron of philosophers. His court poets included Abul Ala Ganjavi, Khaqani and Falaki himself.

== Family ==
He was married to the Georgian princess Tamar c. 1111. Together they had at least four sons (Akhsitan I, Afridun II, Shahanshah and Farrukhzad I) and two unnamed daughters. Following Manuchihr III's death, Tamar went back to Georgia, where she became a nun. According to the genealogist Cyril Toumanoff, one of her sons, established in Georgia, was enfeoffed of Abkhazia and became forefather of the Shervashidze family.

It has been proposed that Manuchihr III may have divided his kingdom amongst his sons upon his death, due to coin mints demonstrating the coinciding reign of Akhsitan I, Shahanshah, Afridun II and his son Fariburz II. Afridun II and Fariburz II may have ruled in the western part of the kingdom, while coin mints of Shahanshah demonstrate that he was based in Shamakhi. However, the latter has also been suggested to have been the successor of Akhsitan I.

== Sources ==
- Beelaert, Anna Livia (2010). "Ḵāqāni Šervāni". In Yarshater, Ehsan (ed.). Encyclopædia Iranica. Vol. XV/5: Ḵamsa of Jamāli–Karim Devona. London and New York: Routledge & Kegan Paul. pp. 522–523. ISBN 978-1-934283-28-8.
- Bosworth, C. E. (2011). "Šervānšāhs". Encyclopaedia Iranica.
- de Blois, Francois (2004). Persian Literature - A Bio-Bibliographical Survey: Poetry of the Pre-Mongol Period (Volume V). Routledge. ISBN 978-0947593476.
- Gould, Rebecca Ruth (2016). "Wearing the Belt of Oppression: Khāqāni's Christian Qasida and the Prison Poetry of Medieval Shirvān". Journal of Persianate Studies. 9 (1): 19–44. doi:10.1163/18747167-12341296.
- Gould, Rebecca Ruth (2022). The Persian Prison Poem. Edinburgh University Press. ISBN 978-1474484015.
- Hasan, Hadi (1929). Falaki-i-Shirwani: His Times, Life, and Works. University of London.
- Hasan, Hadi (1965). "Falakī S̲h̲irwānī". In Lewis, B.; Pellat, Ch. & Schacht, J. (eds.). The Encyclopaedia of Islam, Second Edition. Volume II: C–G. Leiden: E. J. Brill. p. 764. OCLC 495469475.
- Kouymjian, Dickran (1969). A Numismatic History of Southeastern Caucasia and Adharbayjan based on the Islamic Coinage of the 5th/11th to the 7th/13th Centuries. Columbia University.
- Minorsky, V. (1945). "Khāqānī and Andronicus Comnenus". Bulletin of the School of Oriental and African Studies. 11 (3): 550–578. doi:10.1017/S0041977X0007227X. JSTOR 609336.
- Minorsky, Vladimir (1958). A History of Sharvān and Darband in the 10th-11th Centuries. Cambridge: W. Heffer & Sons, Ltd.
- Sajjadi, Z. (1984). "Aḵestān". In Yarshater, Ehsan (ed.). Encyclopædia Iranica. Vol. I/7: Ahriman–Alafrank. London and New York: Routledge & Kegan Paul. pp. 718–719. ISBN 978-0-71009-096-6.
- Toumanoff, Cyrille (1976). Manuel de Généalogie et de Chronologie pour l'histoire de la Caucasie chrétienne (Arménie, Géorgie, Albanie) [Manual of Genealogy and Chronology of Christian Caucasian History (Armenia, Georgia, Albania)] (in French). Rome: Edizioni Aquila.

Manuchihr III of Shirvan Kasranids Born: 1091–1097 Died: after 1160
Regnal titles
Preceded by Afridun I	Shirvanshah; 1120 – after 1160	Succeeded by Akhsitan I
