= Akhsitan I =

Shirvanshah

- Shirvanshah al-Maliku'l-Mu'azzam
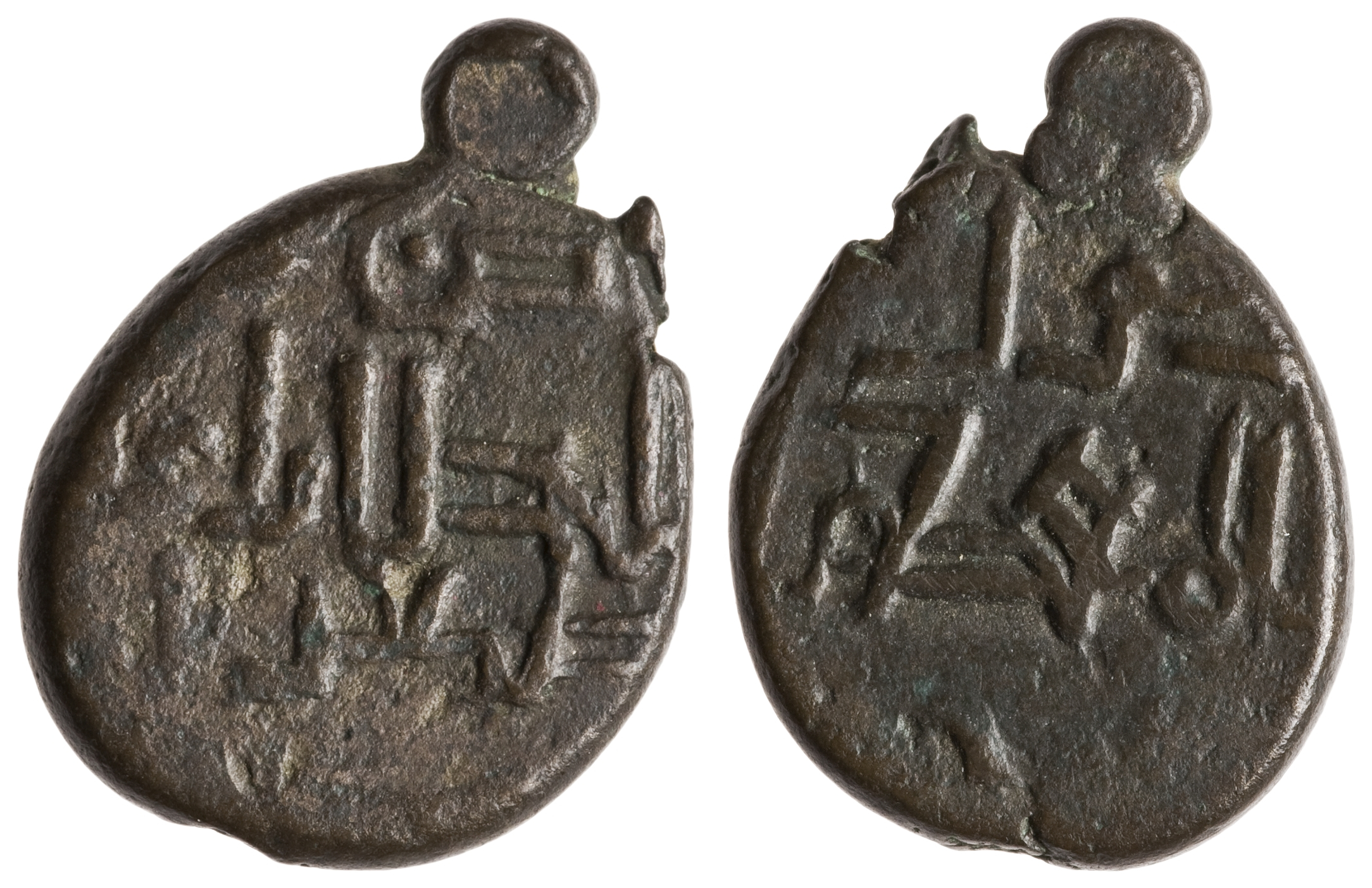
- Coin of Akhsitan I, minted at Shamakhi between 1175 and 1194

Shirvanshah
- Reign: after 1160 – 1197–1203/04
- Predecessor: Manuchihr III
- Successor: Afridun II (possibly); Shahanshah; Farrukhzad I
- Born: c. 1112
- Died: 1197–1203/04
- Consort: Safwat al-Din
- Dynasty: Kasranids
- Father: Manuchihr III
- Mother: Tamar
- Religion: Sunni Islam

Akhsitan I (also spelled Akhsatan; Persian: اخستان یکم, romanized: Aḵestān) was the 20th Shirvanshah after 1160, and thought to have reigned until the years 1197–1203/04. He was the son and successor of Manuchihr III (r. 1120 – after 1160). His mother was Tamar, a Georgian princess from the Bagrationi dynasty.

The details regarding Akhsitan's reign are uncertain and obscure. He may have ruled the kingdom together with members of his family, Shahanshah, Afridun II and Fariburz II. He is notable for moving his place of residence to Baku, which marked its beginning as a major city. Akhsitan was also notably the patron of both Khaqani and Nizami Ganjavi, two leading Persian poets.

== Name ==
"Akhsitan" is a shortened version of the Georgian name Aghsarthan, itself of Ossetian origin (cf. Ossetian äxsar or äxsart, meaning "might"). The Georgian Chronicles refers Akhsitan as "Aysartan".

== Background ==
"Shirvanshah" was the title of the rulers of the eastern Caucasian region Shirvan. During this period, the Shirvanshahs belonged to a family referred to as the Kasranids, who now has been demonstrated to have been the same family as the previous ruling dynasty, the Yazidids. Akhsitan was the son of the Shirvanshah Manuchihr III (r. 1120 – after 1160) and the Georgian princess Tamar of the Bagrationi dynasty. Akhsitan had three brothers, Shahanshah, Afridun II, and Farrukhzad I. During this period, Shirvan was a Georgian protectorate, which it would remain until around 1223. Following the death of Manuchihr III, Tamar went back to Georgia, where she became a nun.

== Reign ==
The events during the start and end of Akhsitan's reign are obscure. He succeeded his father sometime after 1160. One of the coins minted during his rule is estimated to have been produced between 1160 and 1169. It has been proposed that Manuchihr III may have divided his kingdom amongst his sons upon his death, due to coin mints demonstrating the coinciding reign of Akhsitan, Shahanshah, Afridun II and his son Fariburz II. Afridun II and Fariburz II may have ruled in the western part of the kingdom, while coin mints of Shahanshah demonstrate that he was based in Shamakhi. However, the latter has also been suggested to have been the successor of Akhsitan.

In late 1173 or early 1174, Shirvan was invaded by a combined force of the Russian "brodnici" and the ruler of Darband, Bek-Bars ibn Muzaffar. Akhsitan subsequently requested the help of his cousin George III (r. 1156–1184), the king of Georgia. The latter repelled the invaders and brought back order to the affected areas. The Eldiguzid ruler Qizil Arslan (r. 1186–1191) later seized Shamakhi, which made Akhsitan move his place of residence to Baku. This marked the beginning of Baku's rise as a major city, though it remains uncertain if Akhsitan later moved back to Shamakhi.

Akhsitan's death is not mentioned in the divan of the Persian poet Khaqani, which has led the modern historian Hadi Hasan to surmise that Akhsitan must have survived him. An inscription from 1203 or 1204 mentions Farrukhzad I as the Shirvanshah. This means that Akhsitan's reign ended between 1197 and 1203 or 1204.

Akhsitan's predecessors had used the title of al-Malik ("King") on their coins, Akhsitan instead used the title of al-Maliku'l-Mu'azzam ("The Supreme Malik") like his father. He also used the title of Shirvanshah on his coins like Ali II of Shirvan.

== Family ==
He was married to his cousin ‘Ismatu’d-Din Safwatud-Din Safwat’l-Islam with whom he had at least two children with her, a son - Fariburz and a daughter - Iljik, both died in infancy. His eldest son and heir apparent Minuchihr who was alive around 1188 did not survive his father either.

== Patronage ==
During the 12th century, Shirvan served as the focal point for Persian literature. Two prominent Shirvan-based poets were active during this time—Khaqani and Nizami Ganjavi (died 1209), both of whom at least once had the same patron, Akhsitan. Khaqani, who had previously served under Manuchihr III, continued his service under Akhsitan, who would become his most important patron. Khaqani dedicated twelve qasidas (odes) and seven tarkibbands to Akhsitan, who in return greatly rewarded him. He also dedicated poems to Akhsitan's wife ‘Ismatu’d-Din Safwatud-Din Safwat’l-Islam. However, just as Manuchihr III had incarcerated Khaqani, he was imprisoned by Akhsitan. In 1188, Nizami Ganjavi dedicated his Layla and Majnun to Akhsitan. Zahir-al-Din Faryabi (died 1201) dedicated at least one poem to Akhsitan.

== Bibliography ==
- Beelaert, Anna Livia (2010). "Ḵāqāni Šervāni". In Yarshater, Ehsan (ed.). Encyclopædia Iranica. Vol. XV/5: Ḵamsa of Jamāli–Karim Devona. London and New York: Routledge & Kegan Paul. pp. 522–523. ISBN 978-1-934283-28-8.
- Bosworth, C. E. (2011). "Šervānšāhs". Encyclopaedia Iranica.
- Hasan, Hadi (1929). Falaki-i-Shirwani: His Times, Life, and Works. University of London.
- de Blois, Francois (2004). Persian Literature - A Bio-Bibliographical Survey: Poetry of the Pre-Mongol Period (Volume V). Routledge. ISBN 978-0947593476.
- Gould, Rebecca Ruth (2016). "Wearing the Belt of Oppression: Khāqāni's Christian Qasida and the Prison Poetry of Medieval Shirvān". Journal of Persianate Studies. 9 (1): 19–44. doi:10.1163/18747167-12341296.
- Kouymjian, Dickran (1969). A Numismatic History of Southeastern Caucasia and Adharbayjan based on the Islamic Coinage of the 5th/11th to the 7th/13th Centuries. Columbia University.
- Minorsky, V. (1945). "Khāqānī and Andronicus Comnenus". Bulletin of the School of Oriental and African Studies. 11 (3): 550–578. doi:10.1017/S0041977X0007227X. JSTOR 609336.
- Minorsky, Vladimir (1958). A History of Sharvān and Darband in the 10th-11th Centuries. Cambridge: W. Heffer & Sons, Ltd.
- Sajjadi, Z. (1984). "Aḵestān". In Yarshater, Ehsan (ed.). Encyclopædia Iranica. Vol. I/7: Ahriman–Alafrank. London and New York: Routledge & Kegan Paul. pp. 718–719. ISBN 978-0-71009-096-6.

Akhsitan I Kasranids
Regnal titles
Preceded by Manuchihr III	Shirvanshah after 1160 – 1197–1203/04	Succeeded by Farrukhzad I or Shahanshah
