= Pir Mardakan Khanqah =

Historic architectural monument located in Azerbaijan

- Azerbaijani: Pir Mərdəkan xanəgahı
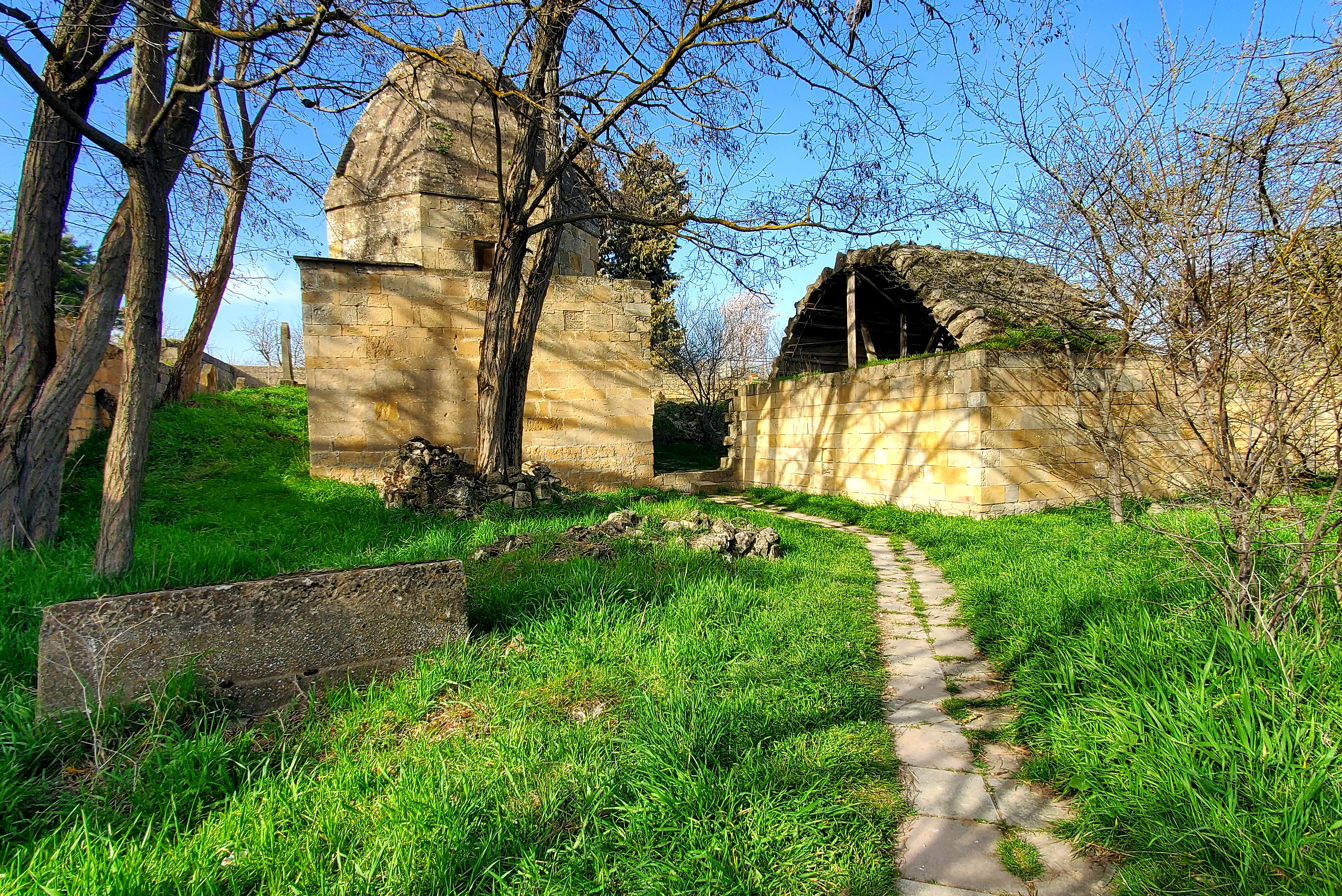

- Location within Azerbaijan

General information
- Type: khanqah
- Architectural style: Architectural school of Shirvan-Absheron
- Location: Goyler village, Shamakhi, Azerbaijan
- Coordinates: 40.488494°N 48.685561°E
- Completed: XIII–XV centuries
- Client: Shirvanshahs

Pir Mardakan Khanqah (Azerbaijani: Pir Mərdəkan xanəgahı) is a historic architectural monument located in the village of Goylar, 16 km south-west of Shamakhi district of the Azerbaijan Republic. The complex includes a tomb, a dynasty building and small auxiliary buildings. It was built in XIII–XIV centuries. According to some sources, this is the tomb of Seyid Mardakani, one of the famous scholars of his time.

== History ==
Some of the remaining inscriptions on the gravestone and on the wall were read by M. Nematova. On these inscriptions it is shown that the monument was built in 1188–1203 (583–600 of Hijri calendar). According to the style characteristics, the history of the monument is dated back to the early XIII century.

There is an ancient cemetery, caravanserai complex around the khanqah. An inscription on the facade of the monument, written in the Arabic written in thuluth script with kufic element, says: "In the Name of Allah, the merciful and the gracious. This is the grave of the Sheikh, the Imam, the greatest scientist, the believer, Tair Taj Al-Huda Mardakani Ibn Ali. May Allah have mercy upon them...."

It is possible to clarify history of the monument based on the second inscription on the tomb. A small part, two lines of the inscription fixed on the left wall, on the left side of entering from the door, remains: "The greatest padishah, khagan... Farrukhzad ibn Fazilalmuwahhid Manuchihr..." The author explains that this is ruler is Shirvanshah Farrukhzad I, the son of Shirvanshah Manuchihr III. He also lived in the XIII century.

The scientist notes that there is a place named Madak in Iranian Azerbaijan. The "-ani" suffix indicates that the owner of the grave is from there. The word "Madakani" transformed into "Mardakan", over the history.

== Architectural features ==
The tomb, which is a part of the complex, has reached today's era with almost its original view. These mausoleums, which have other examples in the architecture of Azerbaijan, typically consist of a combination of two-domed and tower-shaped tombs. As examples of this type of mausoleum in architecture of Azerbaijan, the tomb in Alinjachay Khanqah in Nakhchivan and other tombs can be. The plan of the Pir Mardakan mausoleum repeats the very coincidental version of the tombs with domes. By volume, these types of tombs consist of a combination of two combinations. The bottom part is with a dome and tower, and the upper part is covered with a dome. The upper part looks independent of the outside in terms of its composition, not as a continuation of the bottom part, since usually in such tombs there is no gradual transition between cube-shaped and the upper tower parts.

As mausoleums with dome were temple-type buildings, people used to come and pay visit to the buried and hold religious ceremonies in such places. Therefore, these types of mausoleums were also used as a mosque. The internal tomb part of the mausoleum square shaped according to the structure of it and through squinches in the corners it turns into an octagon. The eight-edged prism on the octagon is covered with a pyramidal tent. When remotely looking at the tomb, it resembles an ordinary octagonal tomb because relief of the earth covers the lower-cubed portion. The size of the outer walls of it is 4.6x5 m, and the internal walls are 2.6x2.6 m. The height of the square part is 3 m, the height of the pyramid is 4.7 m.

From the east side of the tomb khanqah building with three rooms is fixed. Large room is 4.4x7.3 m in size and is for worship. Only one of the rooms reached today's era. The other two rooms are completely destroyed.

This monument belongs to a group of tombs of Azerbaijan with towers and domes according to many features of it. Monuments that share similarities with Pir Mardakan Khanqah according to the structural and architectural features, monuments similar to Pir Mardakan Khanate are spread in other Turkic countries. For example, in Turkmenistan there are several architectural monuments repeating the architectural features of this tomb. Fakhraddin Razi and Sheikh Sharif mausoleums in Kunya-Urgench can be examples.

== Gallery ==
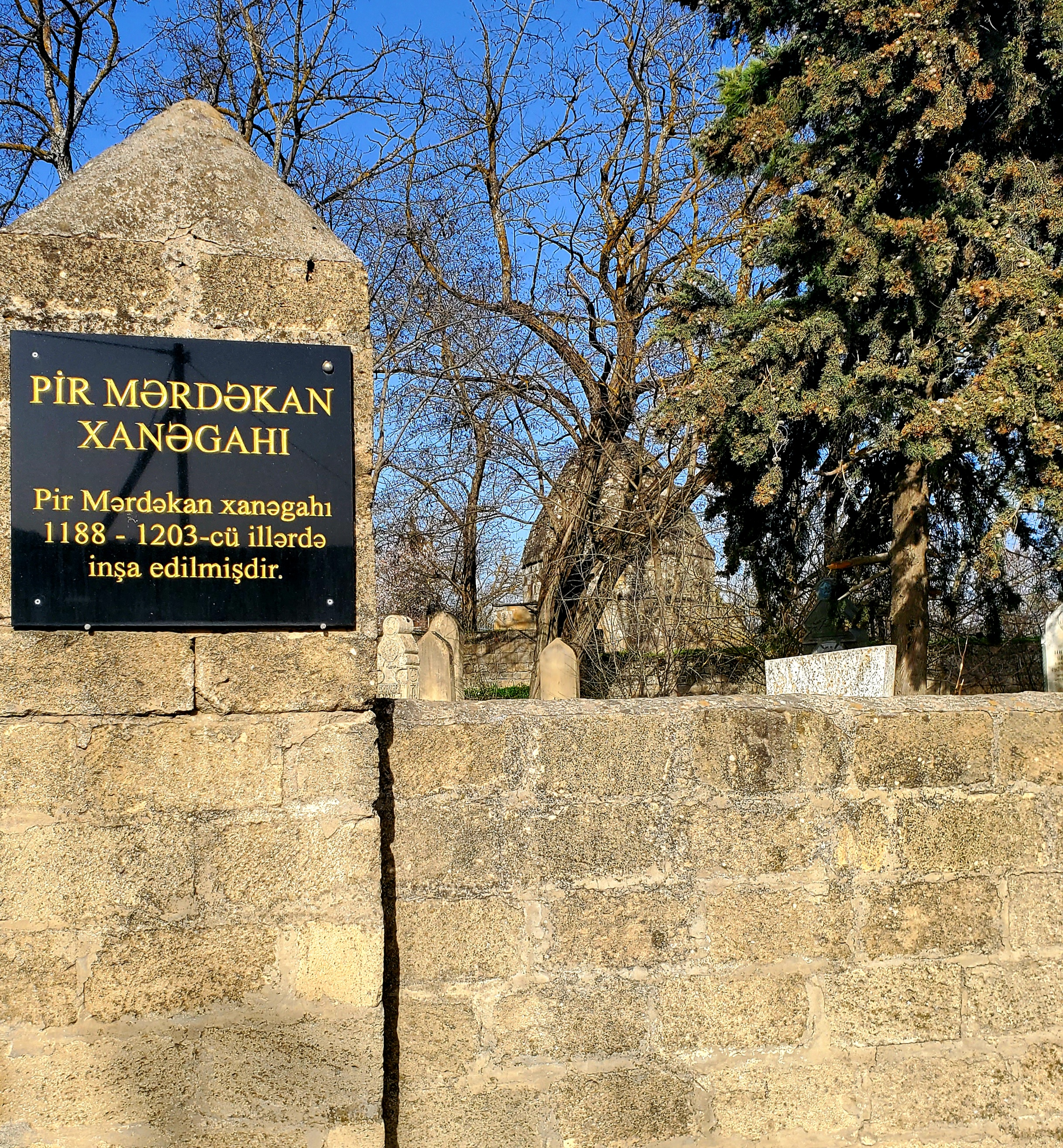

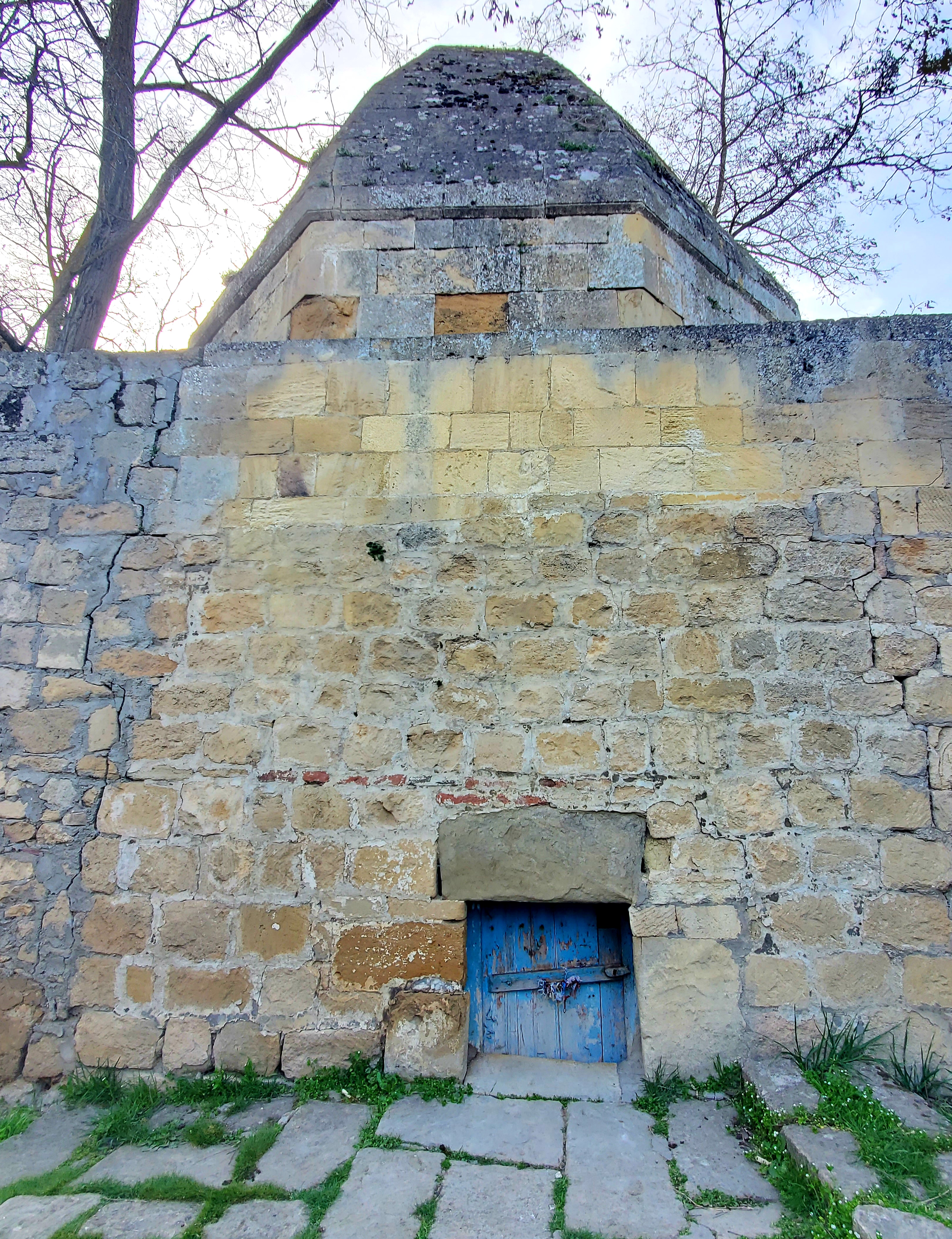

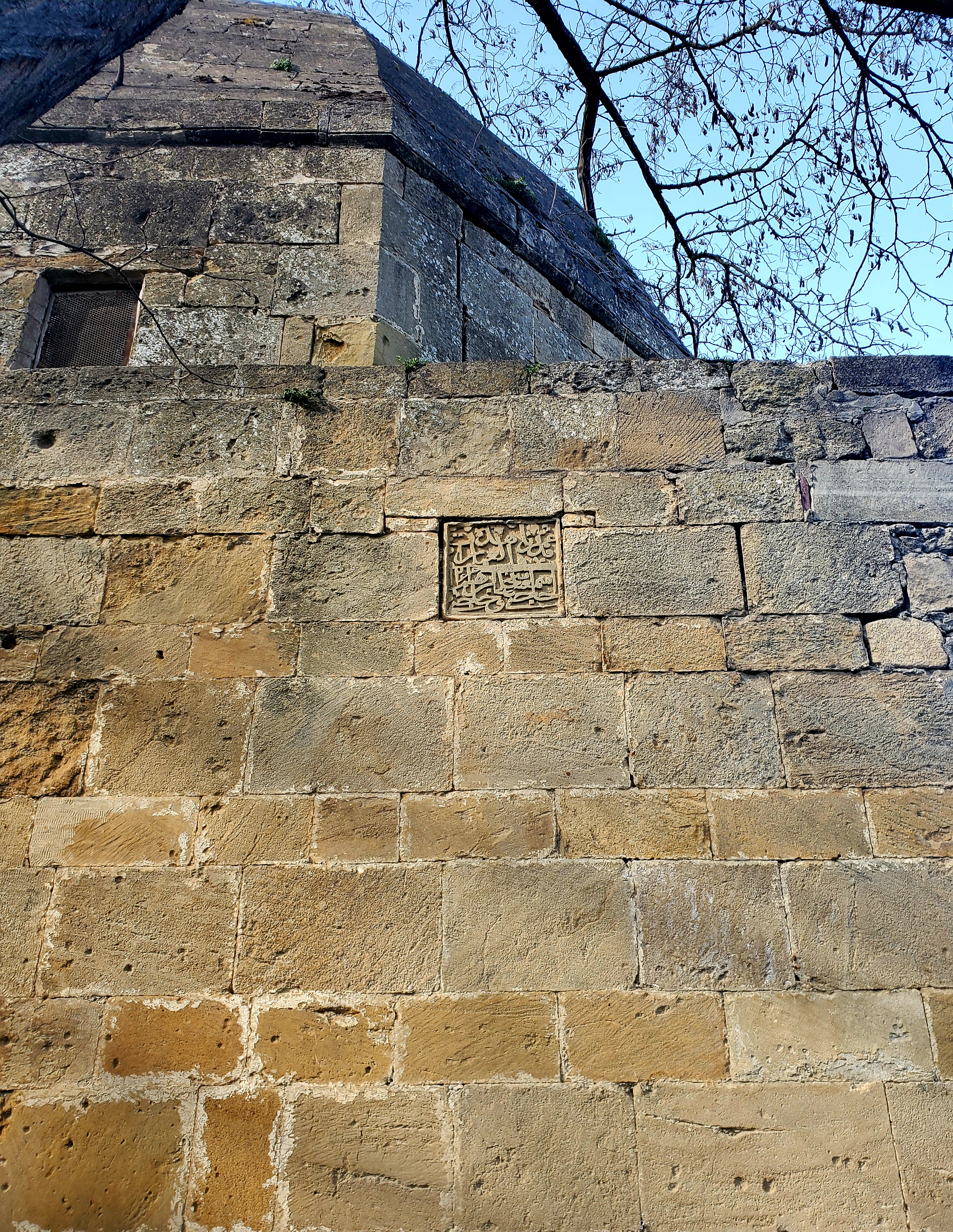

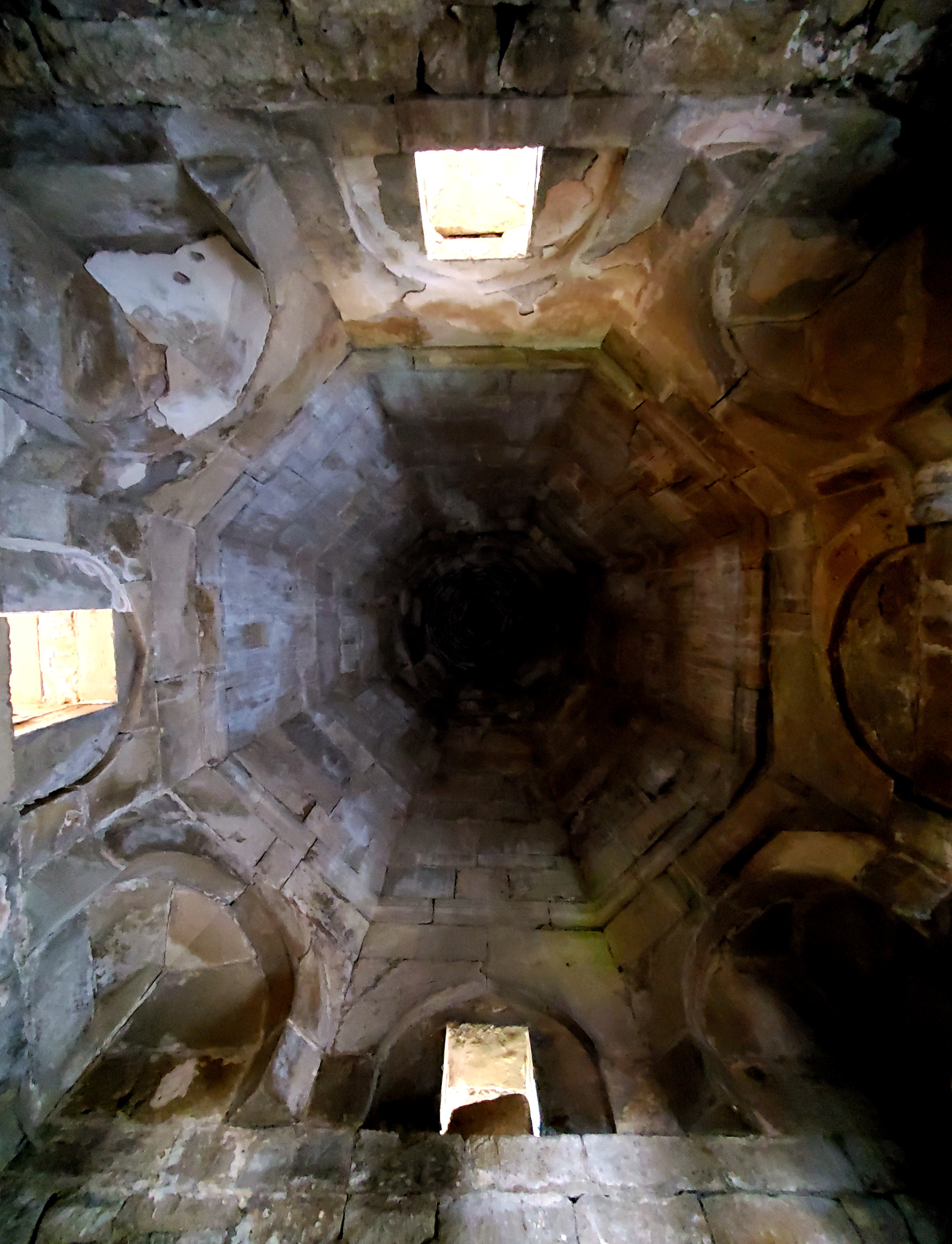

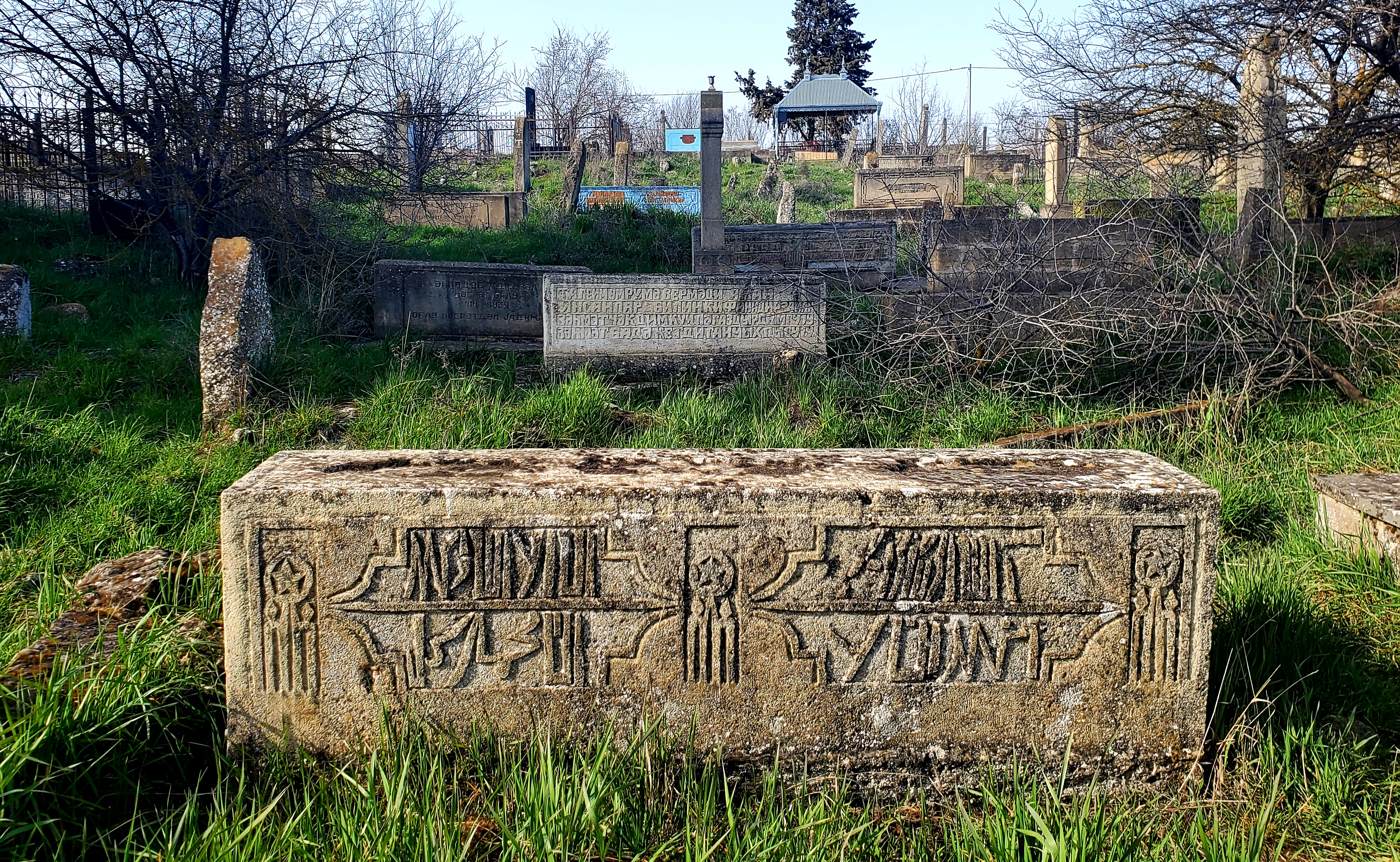

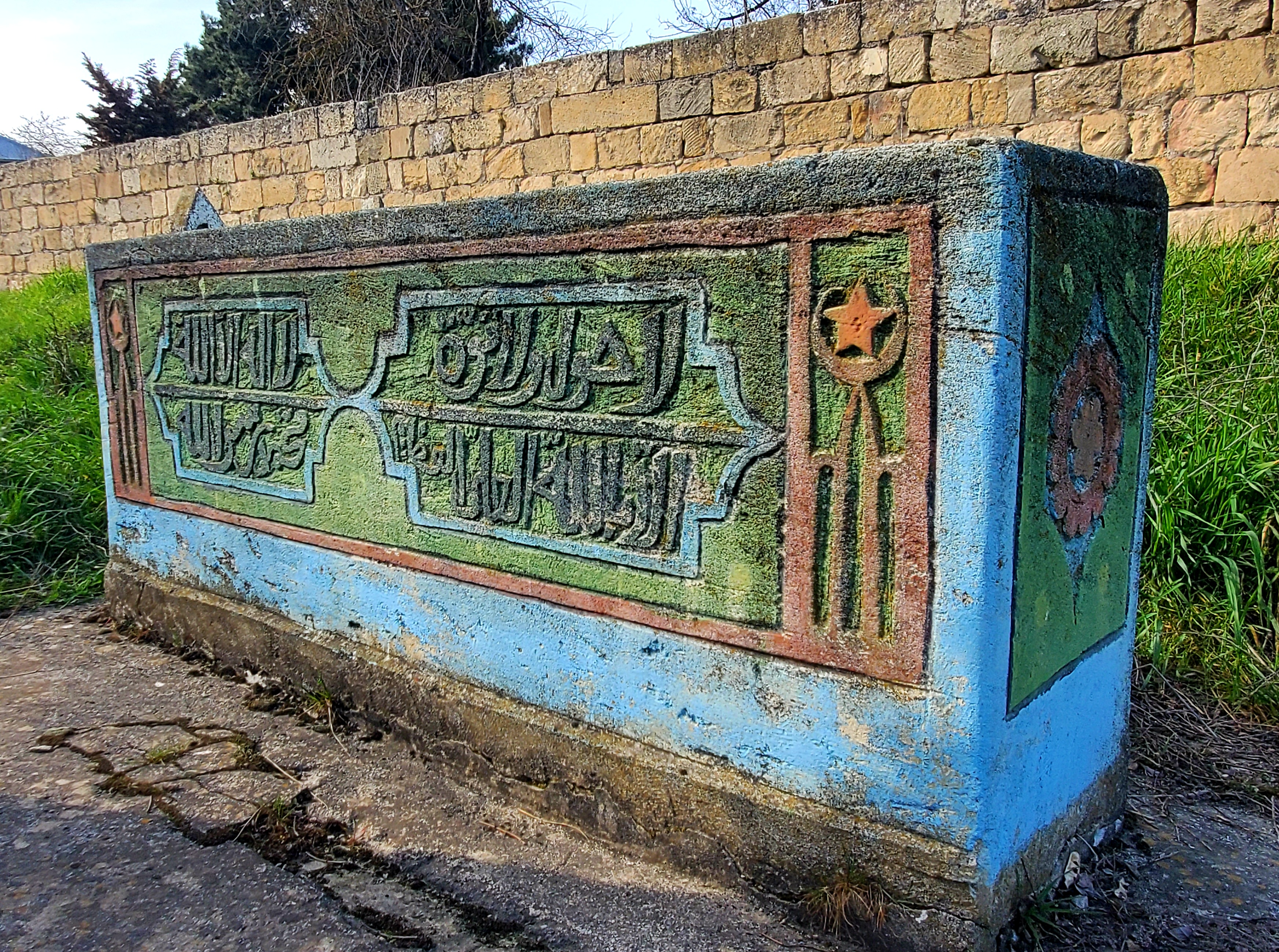

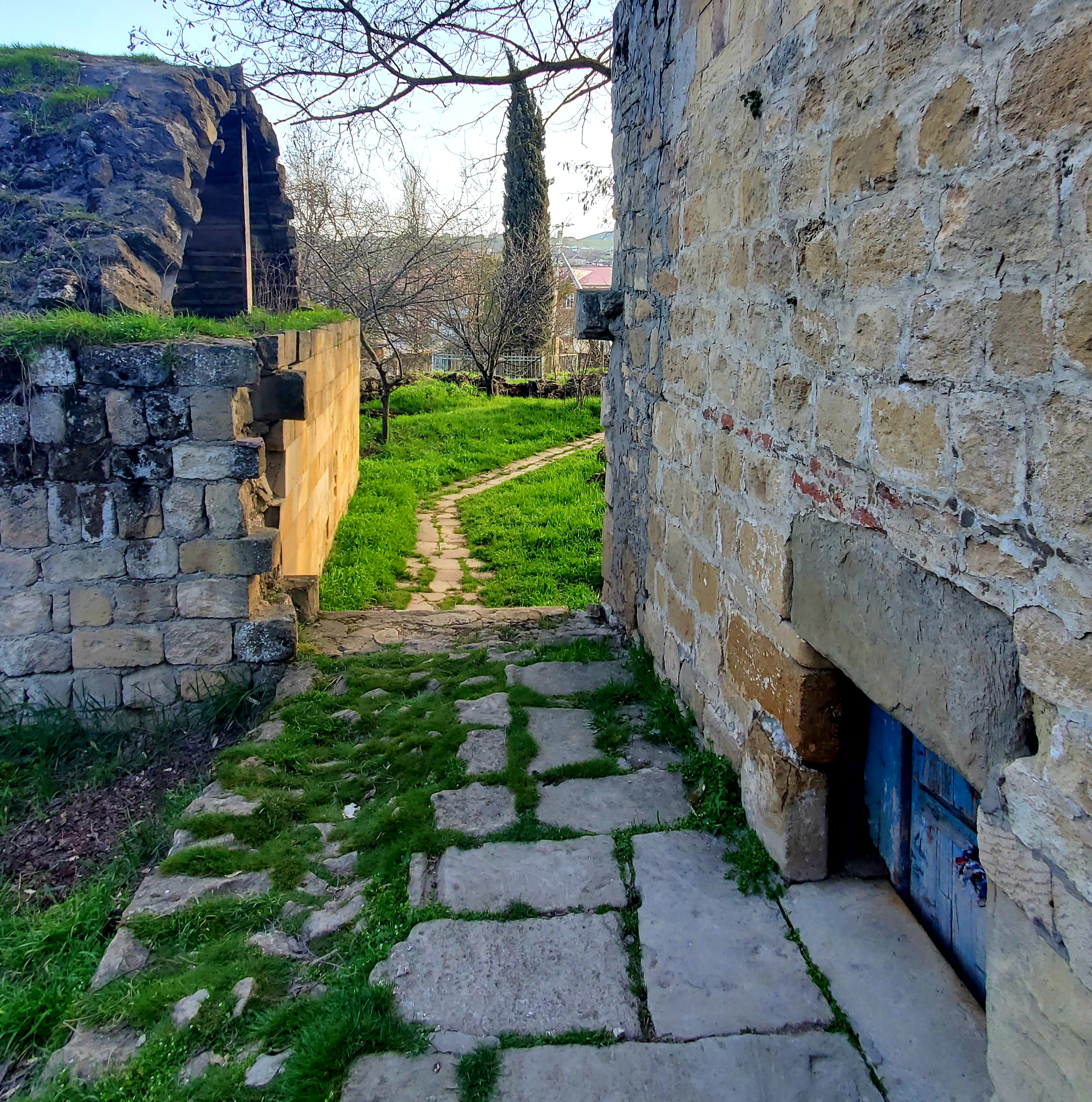

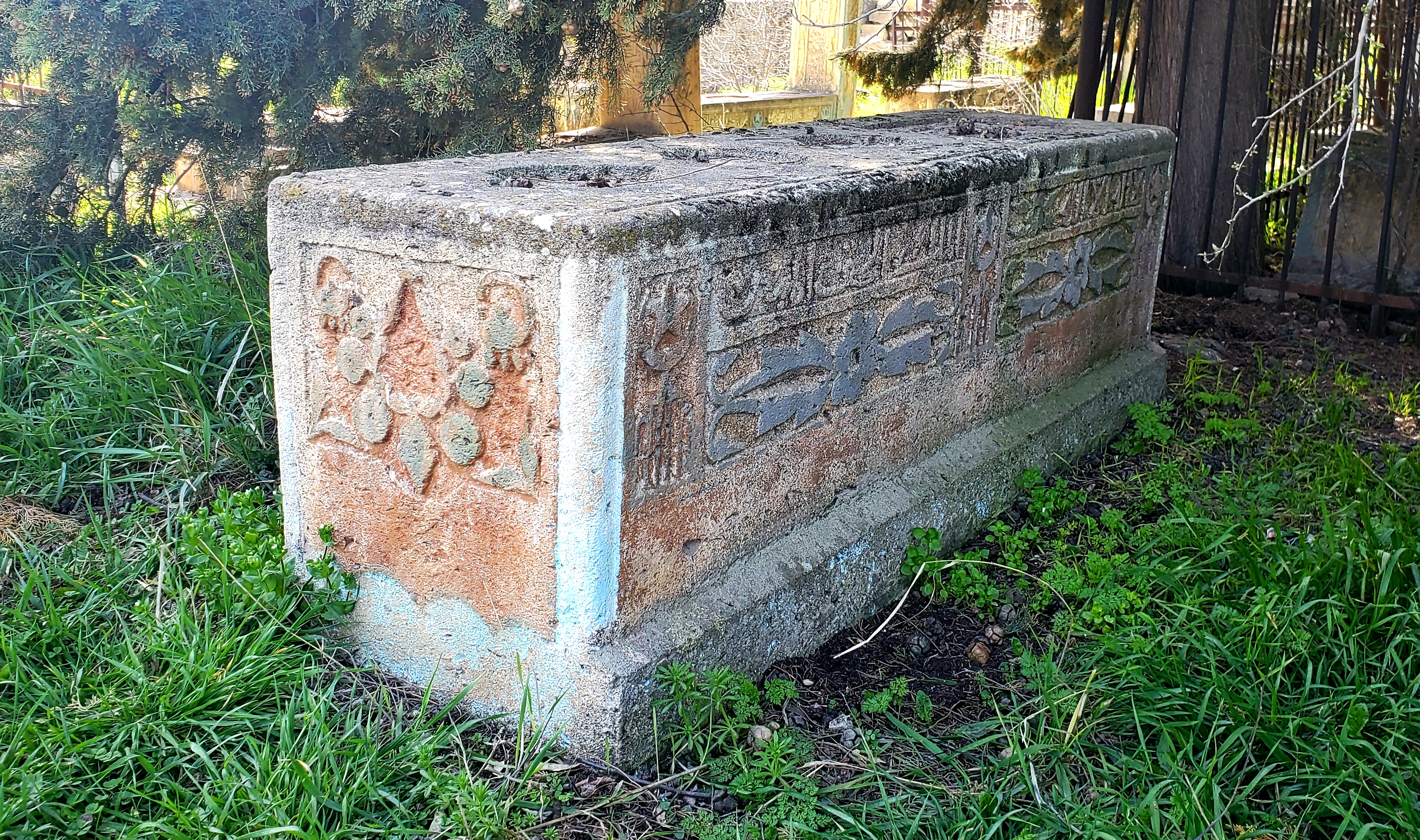

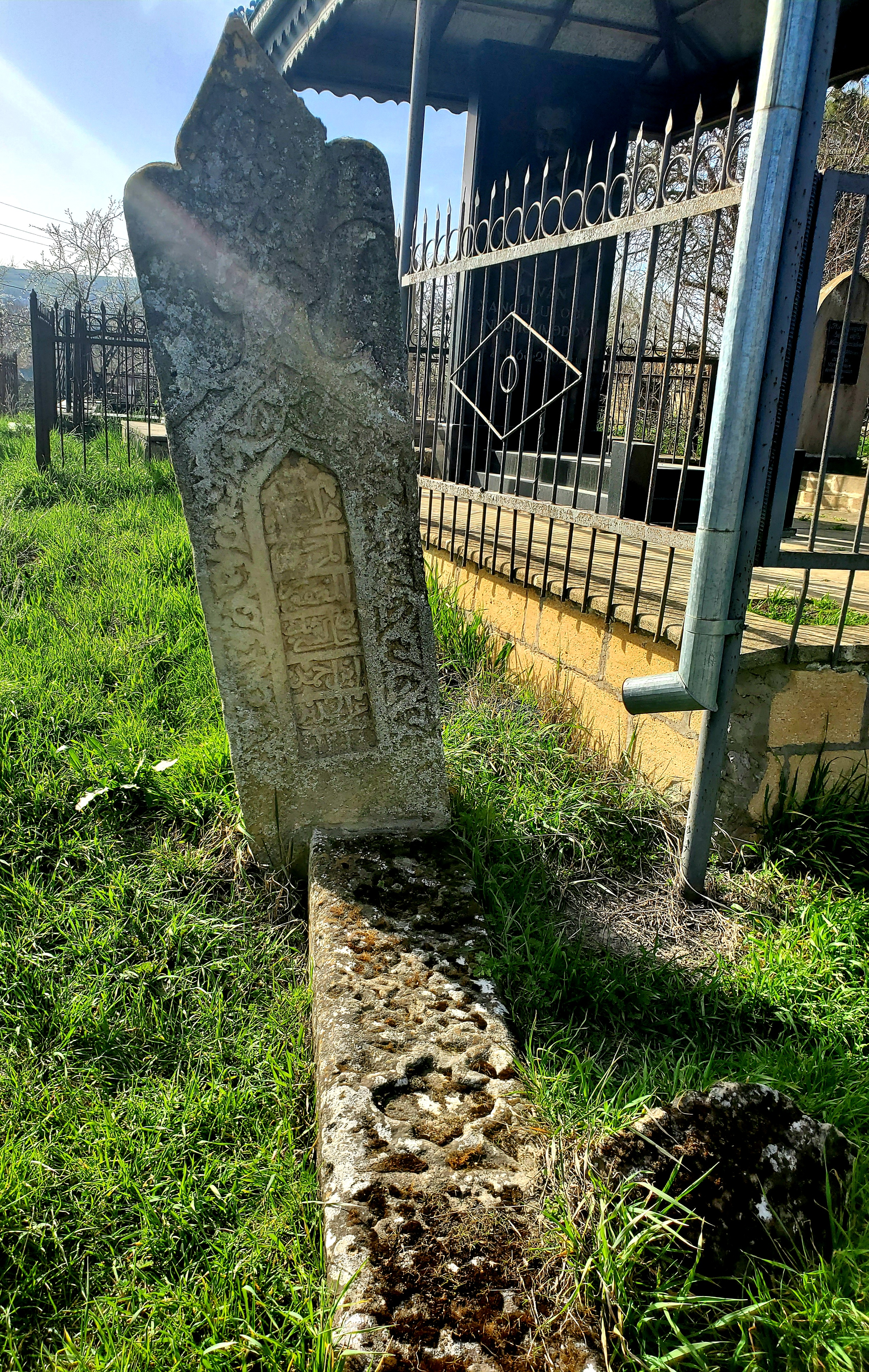
