= Manuchihr I of Shirvan =

11th Shirvanshah (ruled 1027–1034)

Manuchihr I

Shirvanshah
- Reign: 1027 – 1034
- Predecessor: Yazid II
- Successor: Ali II
- Died: 1034; Yazidiya
- Spouse: Sitt bint Fadl a woman of Tabasaran
- Issue: Hormuzd
- House: Kasranids
- Father: Yazid II
- Religion: Islam

Manuchihr ibn Yazid, also Minuchihr, was the eleventh Shirvanshah, ruling from 1027 until he was murdered by his brother in 1034. He was the son of Yazid ibn Ahmad, and his accession marks the point at which the Shirvanshahs abandoned Arabic names for names drawn from the pre-Islamic Iranian past and asserted descent from the Sasanian king Bahram Gur; he is accordingly reckoned the first of the Kasranid line. His short reign was taken up with a losing war against the Emirate of Derbent and with a series of raids on Shirvan by the Rus, the Alans and the people of Sarir.

== Reign ==
Manuchihr succeeded his father in 418 AH (1027/1028 CE). In 420 AH (1029/1030 CE) he went to fight the people of Derbent over the estate of Mujakabad, which belonged to Masqat. He was defeated, and in 421 AH (1030/1031 CE) the people of Derbent raided the Shirvanshah's dominions and ruined many places in his territory.

Later in 421 AH (1030/1031 CE) the Rus entered Shirvan in thirty-eight ships and Manuchihr met them near Bakuya (Baku). Many of the Shirvanians were killed, among them a notable named Ahmad ibn Khasskin. The Rus then went up the Kura, and Manuchihr closed the Araxes to stop their progress, but they drowned a party of Muslims.

The Rus were then engaged as mercenaries by Musa ibn Fadl, eldest son of the Shaddadid ruler of Ganja, who needed them for his father's cause against his brother Askariya, then besieged at Baylaqan. They abandoned their boats, helped Musa take the town, and, richly rewarded, moved westward towards Byzantine territory before completing their circuit of the Caucasus and returning home; Minorsky thought their destination was probably Tmutarakan.

Ta'rikh Bab al-abwab chapter on Arran records the arrival of the Rus for a second time in 422 AH (1030/1031 CE), stating that "he" fought them near Bakuya, killed a large number of their warriors and expelled them from his country. Minorsky was uncertain whether the subject is Musa ibn Fadl, who had by then succeeded his father, or the Shirvanshah, the passage being defective, and thought it possible that this is only another version of the events of 423 AH (1031/1032 CE).

In 423 AH (1031/1032 CE) the people of Sarir and the Alans made an agreement, raided Shirvan and took the capital Yazidiya by force. There and elsewhere in Shirvan they killed more than 10,000 people and stayed ten days digging up the ground to extract the money and goods the inhabitants had buried in it. As they returned home laden with plunder they reached the Wooden Gate, where the people of the March of Derbent fell on them, barred the roads and defiles and slaughtered the army, recovering everything that had been carried off from Shirvan. Only a small party escaped, among them the lord of the Alans, who came back in 424 AH (1032/1033 CE) to take his revenge on Derbent and was defeated again.

The two chapters of the chronicle do not agree about these raids. The chapter on Shirvan distinguishes the Rus raid of 421 AH (1030/1031 CE) from the raid of the Alans and the Saririans in 423 AH (1031/1032 CE), whereas the chapter on Derbent names the Rus as the aggressors who were despoiled of their booty by the people of Derbent. Minorsky considered collusion between all the anti-Muslim elements entirely conceivable, but noted that the Saririans go unmentioned in the Derbent account, possibly because the emir Mansur ibn Maymun was married to a daughter of the lord of Sarir.

== Family ==
Manuchihr's son Hormuzd died on 9 April 1065 on the hereditary estate in Tabasaran and was buried there beside his maternal uncles, which indicates that his mother came from that country. Sara Ashurbeyli took the burial to show that Tabasaran formed part of the Shirvanshahs' lands and was governed by their kinsmen. His brothers were Anushirvan, who had rebelled against their father and died in prison; Abu-Mansur Ali; Qubad; Ahmad; Sallar; and Mamlan. His sister Shamkuya was married to the emir of Derbent Abd al-Malik II.

== Murder ==
In 425 AH (1033/1034 CE), after a reign of seven years, Manuchihr was murdered in his own house by his younger brother Abu-Mansur Ali, who had been afraid of the Shirvanshah and was in hiding from him. According to the chronicle, Abu-Mansur entered Yazidiya one night when the inhabitants had relaxed their guard and sent word of his arrival to his brother's wife Sitt, daughter of the Shaddadid Fadl ibn Muhammad, who was attached to him. She sent one of her women to him with a kitchen-box, in which he was carried into the palace. When he had reached her house she summoned her husband and showed him a letter she had received from her brother Musa ibn Fadl. As Manuchihr was reading it and explaining its contents to her, Abu-Mansur emerged from the far end of the house with a drawn sword. Manuchihr asked who had let him into his house, but before he could finish speaking Abu-Mansur struck him on the back of the neck; he meant to repeat the blow, but the sword slipped from his hand for the fear that had seized him, whereupon Sitt ordered her handmaidens to complete the killing. Manuchihr's body was wrapped in a rug while Abu-Mansur went out and had the gates of the castle shut.

Abu-Mansur Ali took the throne as Ali II, gave orders for his brother's burial and, after the prescribed waiting period, married his widow in January 1035. Minorsky refers to Sitt as "the treacherous princess"; she was a daughter of Fadl ibn Muhammad and a sister of Musa ibn Fadl, and was thus an aunt of the wife of the later Shirvanshah Sallar.

== Sources ==
- Ashurbeyli, Sara (2007). Şirvanşahlar dövləti [The State of the Shirvanshahs] (in Azerbaijani) (4th ed.). Baku.
- Madelung, Wilferd (1975). "The minor dynasties of northern Iran". In Frye, R. N. (ed.). The Cambridge History of Iran, Volume 4: From the Arab Invasion to the Saljuqs. Cambridge: Cambridge University Press. pp. 198–249. ISBN 978-0-521-20093-6.
- Minorsky, Vladimir (1958). A History of Sharvān and Darband in the 10th-11th Centuries. Cambridge: W. Heffer & Sons.

Preceded by Yazid II	Shirvanshah; 1027–1034	Succeeded by Ali II
