= Afridun II =

- Shah of Shirvan
- Reign: 1160 (?)
- Predecessor: Manuchihr III of Shirvan
- Successor: Akhsitan I
- Issue: Fariburz II
- House: Kasranid
- Father: Manuchihr III of Shirvan

Afridun II was a Shah of Shirvan. He may have ruled during a time in Shirvanshah history that scholarship has referred to "a period of total confusion", due to the lack of written records and contradictory numismatic evidence. He was a son of Shirvanshah Manuchihr III (r. 1120 – after 1160). He had had three brothers, Akhsitan I, Farrukhzad I, and Shahanshah. He might not have even ruled. He left no numismatic evidence but known from his son Fariburz II's coins.

== Sources ==
- Kouymjian, Dickran (1969). A Numismatic History of Southeastern Caucasia and Adharbayjan based on the Islamic Coinage of the 5th/11th to the 7th/13th Centuries. Columbia University.

Afridun II House of Shirvanshah Born: ? Died: 1160
Regnal titles
Preceded by Shirvanshah Manuchehr III	Shirvanshah; 1160	Succeeded by Shirvanshah Akhsitan I
