= Bukhtnassar =

Shirvanshah
- Reign: 1049–1050
- Predecessor: Qubad
- Successor: Sallar
- Died: 1050; Near Baylaqan
- House: House of Shirvanshah
- Father: Ahmad ibn Yazid

Bukhtnassar Ali was the fourteenth Shirvanshah, ruling from 1049 to 1050. He was the successor and nephew of Qubad. His father Ahmad b. Yazid was a son of Yazid II. He was immediately deposed by his uncle, Sallar. Bukhtnassar managed to escape but was captured and executed by forces of Sallar near Baylaqan.

== Sources ==
- Bosworth, C. E. (1996). The New Islamic Dynasties: A Chronological and Genealogical Manual. New York City: Columbia University Press. ISBN 0-231-10714-5.
- Kouymjian, Dickran (1969). A Numismatic History of Southeastern Caucasia and Adharbayjan based on the Islamic Coinage of the 5th/11th to the 7th/13th Centuries. Columbia University.
- Madelung, Wilferd (1975). "Minor dynasties of northern Iran". In Frye, Richard N. (ed.). The Cambridge History of Iran: From the Arab Invasion to the Saljuqs. Vol. 4. Cambridge: Cambridge University Press. pp. 198–250. ISBN 0-521-20093-8.
- Minorsky, Vladimir (1958). A History of Sharvān and Darband in the 10th-11th Centuries. Cambridge: W. Heffer & Sons, Ltd.

Bukhtnassar House of Shirvanshah Born: ? Died: 1050
Regnal titles
Preceded by Qubad	Shirvanshah; 1049–1050	Succeeded by Sallar
