= Shahanshah (Shirvanshah) =

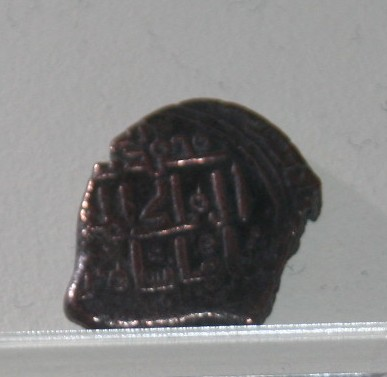
- Copper fulus of Shahanshah, located in the Museum of History of Azerbaijan, Baku

Shirvanshah
- Reign: c. 1180 – c. 1203
- Predecessor: Akhsitan I
- Successor: Farrukhzad I
- Died: c. 1203
- Dynasty: Kasranids
- Father: Manuchihr III

Shahanshah was the Shirvanshah from c. 1180 to c. 1203.

He was a son of Shirvanshah Manuchihr III (r. 1120 – after 1160). He had had three brothers, Akhsitan I, Afridun II, and Farrukhzad I. It has been proposed that Manuchihr III may have divided his kingdom amongst his sons upon his death, due to coin mints demonstrating the coinciding reign of Akhsitan I, Shahanshah, Afridun II and his son Fariburz II. Afridun II and Fariburz II may have ruled in the western part of the kingdom, while coin mints of Shahanshah demonstrate that he was based in Shamakhi. However, the latter has also been suggested to have been the successor of Akhsitan I.

== Sources ==
- Kouymjian, Dickran (1969). A Numismatic History of Southeastern Caucasia and Adharbayjan based on the Islamic Coinage of the 5th/11th to the 7th/13th Centuries. Columbia University.

Shahanshah (Shirvanshah) House of Shirvanshah Died: c. 1203
Regnal titles
| Preceded by Akhsitan I | Shirvanshah c. 1180 – c. 1203 | Succeeded by Farrukhzad I |
