= Fariborz =

Fariborz (Persian: فریبرز), also spelled as Fariburz and Faribarz, is a common Persian given name. It is a combination of two root words: "Fari" and "Borz". "Fari" translates roughly to grand and expanding. "Borz" translates to one's body or profile. This name is cited in Shahnameh (the book of the kings, Ferdowsi' masterpiece) where Fariborz is son of Kay-Kavoos who is son of Kay-Ghobad.

Notable people with the name include:

- Fariburz I, Shah of Shirvan
- Fariburz II, Shah of Shirvan
- Fariburz III, Shah of Shirvan
- Fariborz Arabnia (1964), Iranian actor
- Fariborz Esmaeili, Iranian football Midfielder who played for Iran in the 1964 Summer Olympics
- Fariborz Haghighat (1951), Canadian academic
- Fariborz Lachini (1949), Canadian-Iranian film score composer
- Fariborz Kamkari (1971), Kurdish Iranian film director and producer
- Fariborz Maseeh, American engineer, entrepreneur and philanthropist (www.massiah.com)
- Fariborz Raisdana, Iranian economist
- Fariborz Sahba (1948), Iranian-American architect
