= Ali II of Shirvan =

Ali II
- Shah of Shirvan
- Reign: 1034 – 1043
- Predecessor: Manuchehr I
- Successor: Kubad
- Vizier: Mansur b. Musaddid
- Died: 1043; Shamakhi
- Consort: Sitt (daughter of Fadl ibn Muhammad)
- Issue: Ali III
- House: House of Shirvanshah
- Father: Yazid III

Abu Mansur Ali (Persian: ابو منصور علي) was twelfth Shah of Shirvan, ruling from 1034 to 1043.

== Reign ==
Abu Mansur murdered his elder brother Manuchihr I with aid of his wife and rose to throne, also marrying her in January 1035. He continued to push traditional claims of Shirvanian suzerainty over Emirate of Derbent throughout his reign.

Just a few months later, on 9 February 1035, Abd al-Malik II of Derbent, emir of Derbent was ousted by local nobility who submitted to Ali. Ali in turn entrusted his vizier Mansur b. Musaddid to rule the town. However, these gains were lost just in April after Abd al-Malik invaded the town. In order to seal the peace with Shirvan, he agreed to marry Ali's sister Shamkuya. The news of alliance raised disturbance in Derbent, whose nobility attacked Abd al-Malik's vizier Saqlab b. Muhammad's house and forced the emir to flee to Shirvan. Ali II in turn restored his brother-in-law to his throne. Both Ali and Abd al-Malik died in 1043, and Shirvanshah was succeeded by his younger brother Kubad.

== Coins ==
His coins were found in Çuxur Qəbələ, 1976. The mint name Beylaqan honoring the name of Caliph Al-Qa'im suggests that Shirvanshah extended his domain to southwards. The legend on the coins also implied that Abu Mansur took the laqab of Imad al-Dawla or Amid al-Dawla.

== Sources ==
- Madelung, W. (1975). "The Minor Dynasties of Northern Iran". In Frye, R. N. (ed.). The Cambridge History of Iran, Volume 4: From the Arab Invasion to the Saljuqs. Cambridge: Cambridge University Press. pp. 198–249. ISBN 978-0-521-20093-6.
- Minorsky, Vladimir (1958). A History of Sharvān and Darband in the 10th-11th Centuries. Cambridge: W. Heffer and Sons. OCLC 5042566.

Ali II of Shirvan House of Shirvanshah Born: ? Died: 1043
Regnal titles
Preceded by Manuchehr I	Shirvanshah; 1034-1043	Succeeded by Kubad
