= Baku Fortress Wall =

- Bakı Qalası
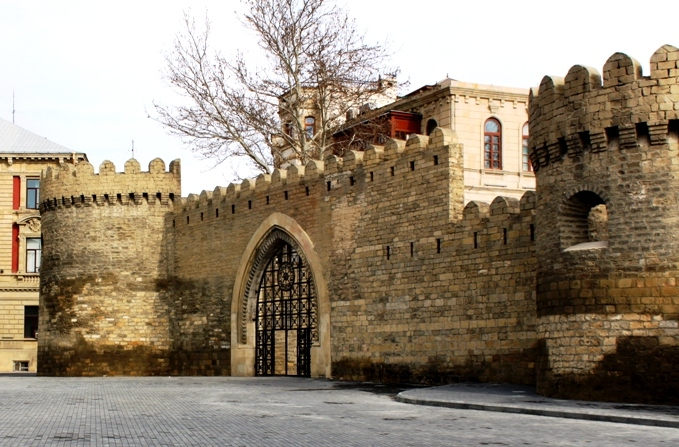

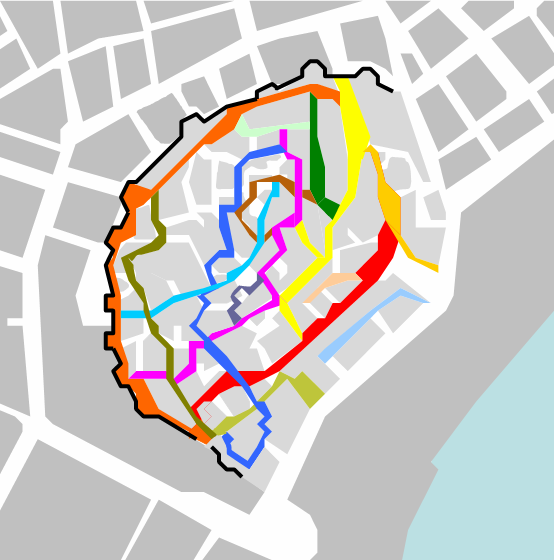
- Location within Streets in Old City, Baku, Azerbaijan

General information
- Type: Fortress
- Location: Baku, Azerbaijan, Sabail raion
- Coordinates: 40.3676°N 49.8332°E

Baku Fortress Wall
UNESCO World Heritage Site
- Interactive map of Baku Fortress Wall
- Location: Azerbaijan
- Criteria: Historical: iv
- Reference: 958
- Inscription: 2000 (24th Session)

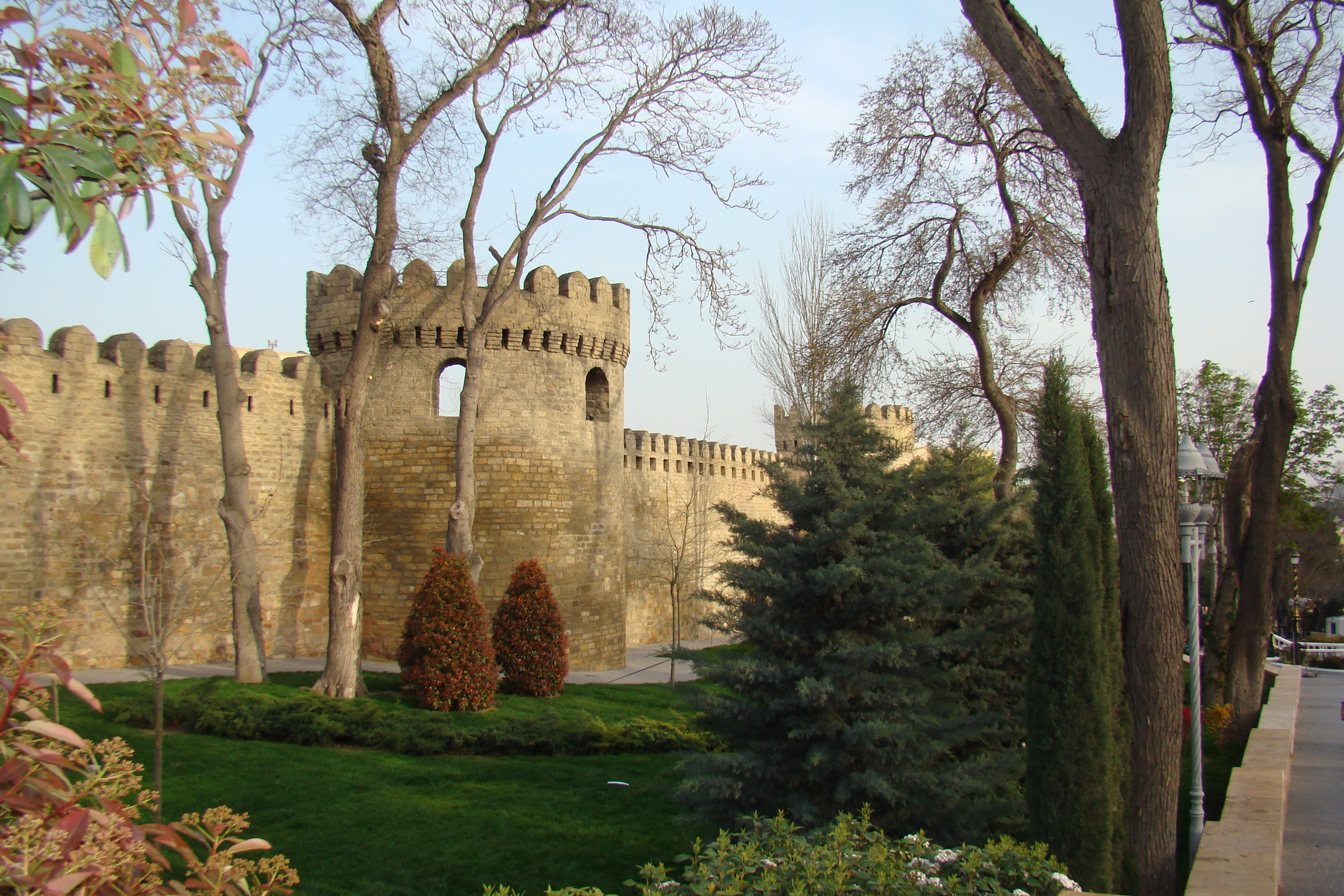
Baku Fortress Wall view from Philharmonic Garden

Baku Fortress (Azerbaijani: Bakı Qalası) is a medieval building in Baku, Azerbaijan, the largest of Absheron fortresses. The fortress consists of the Icheri Sheher and the walls and towers surrounding it, and it was included by UNESCO into the World Cultural Heritage List in 2000. It was built in about 1138–1139 on the order of the Shirvanshah Manuchohr III (1120–1149).

Based on traveler's illustrations and photos of the 19th century, the fortress consisted of a double wall. The first wall was built by the Shirvanshah III Manuchohr, and the second wall was built during the time of Shirvanshah Akhsitan I.

However, the second fortress walls were destroyed during the reign of Russia in Azerbaijan. The first fortress wall still remains. Baku Fortress has two gates. One of them opened to the Caspian Sea and the other to land. The city walls, which had a height of 8–12 meters and a width of 3.5 meters, provided for Baku's security. In the Middle Ages, the fortress walls were 1500 meters long and now the walls are 500 meters long. In the northern part of the fortress, there is the main tower - quadrangular castle. This fortress is called "armory" in the nation's etiology. The peculiarity of the armory is that, despite being a defensive unit, builders have strengthened the wall by raising it in the center of the fortress wall, not in the center of the city.

== History ==
Icheri Sheher (what is now the Old City of Baku) was the capital of Shirvanshahs state several times. For the first time, this incident took place in 1191 when Shirvanshah Akhsitan I moved here with her palace after the terrible earthquake in Shamakhi. Akhsitan I paid special attention to the construction of cities and castles. As a result of his efforts, the complex structure of defense structures in the Absheron peninsula was strengthened, and Baku strongly consolidated it. All this played a crucial role in the attack of Russian Navy Bandits in Baku. The Russians were defeated and their ships were destroyed. The second time Baku became the capital city during the reign of Shirvanshah I Ibrahim. In 1608–1609, Baku judge Zulfugar Khan constructed the second line of 10–12 meters from the old fortifications.

According to some historians, the ditch was filled with seawater between the walls. But in practice this type of fortress is unknown. This inter-walls space was usually used for emergency deployment of troops during the siege. The trench was dug in front of the wall, and between the walls could be a dense trench filled with combustion. It was a safe shelter for the harbor and the ships entering here.

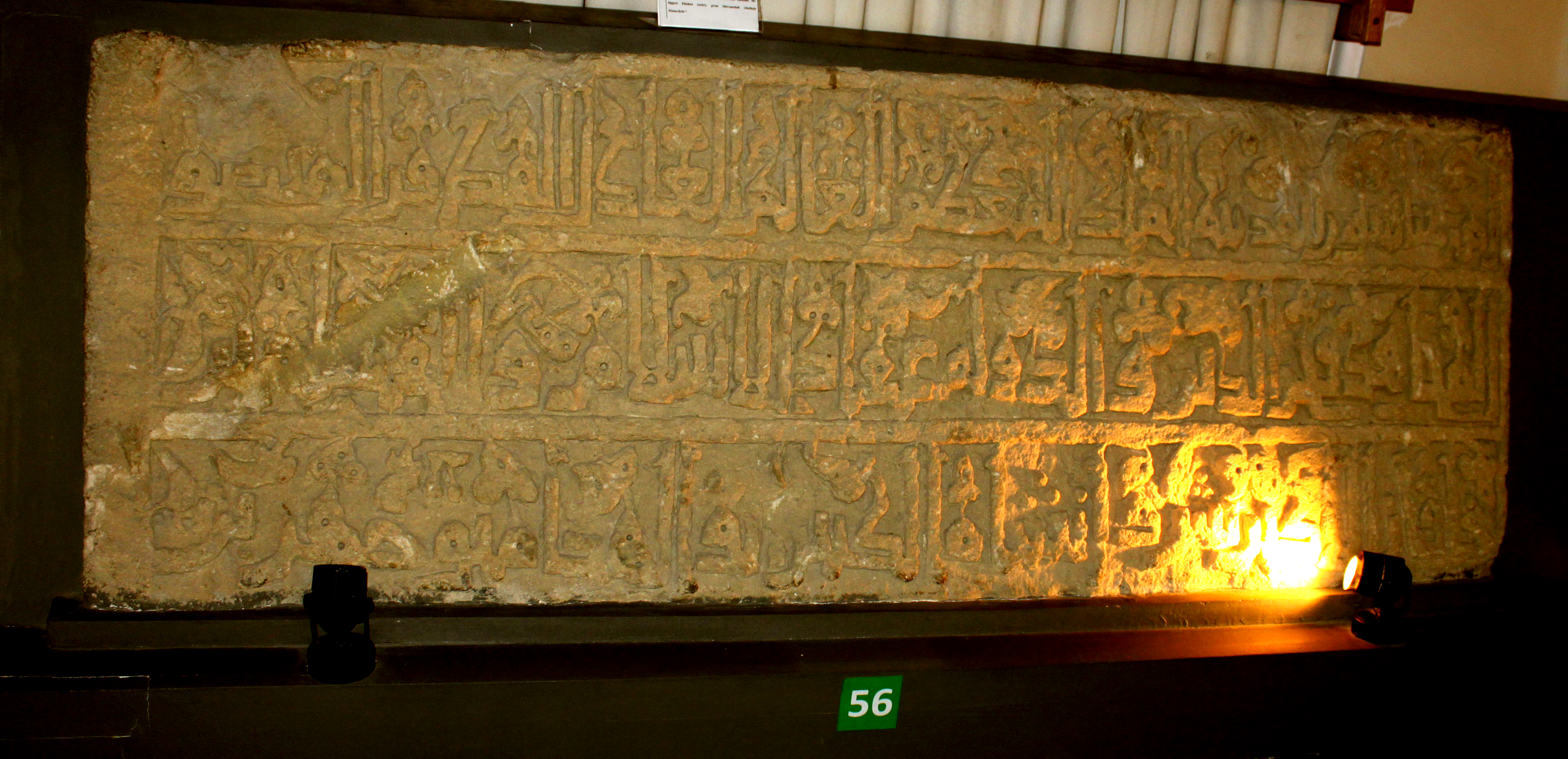
Baku fortress of the 12th century stone inscription, in line with the Kufic Arabic language is written the words: "City Tower building was ordered by magnificent melik, scientist, fair, triumphant, prosaic, mujahid (fighter), and the state of religion, the stronghold of Islam and Muslims, the largest Khagan, the Shirvanshah Abulhija Manouchehr bin". Found in 1954. Museum of History of Azerbaijan....

== 19th century ==
The outer gates of the Baku Fortress Wall demolished in 1883

In 1865, the military governor, he is the manager and the civil part of the Baku province, Lieutenant-General Mikhail Petrovich Kolyubakin requested permission, through the governor of the Caucasus, to destroy the city wall that separated the city from the seashore and "independently of its uselessness, prevented free air movement." Between this wall and the shore remained a strip of land about 20 m wide, littered with debris. In the ways of improving the coastal part of the city and exploring the means to that, at the request of the governor Kolyubakin, the fortress wall on the seashore was broken, the strip between it and the shore was sold to residents and with the money raised, which amounted to 44 thousand rubles, the coastal street of 25 meters was filled wide, fenced from the sea stone embankment.

From the fortress wall facing the sea, only small fragments remained – two rebuilt caravanserai on the street. Khagigat Rzayeva (formerly Varvarinskaya Street) – a street located on the site of the former fortress wall.

In 1867, the Baku fortress, as a military fortification, was abolished by the highest decree, ceasing to be listed as part of military fortresses, along with some other fortresses. Therefore, worries about the state of its walls are not so worried about the military department – they went to the city authorities. The municipal administration at that time was in charge of the provincial administration and the police, i.e. Baku governor and police chief.

By 1879, after the introduction of municipal self-government in Baku, the walls of the fortress had become so dilapidated that in some places they were threatened with collapse even from a strong wind. At the suggestion of the governor V.M. A commission from the provincial and city architects, a member of the Baku city government, the Baku police master, and the head of the Baku artillery department (the artillery department was stationed in the Fortress) was set up to survey the fortress walls.

After lengthy correspondence and approvals, the content of the fortress walls was entrusted to the city government.

At a meeting of the city duma, held on August 7, 1881, the vowels of the duma resolved the issue of demolishing the outer wall of the fortress, which, according to the city mayor of the actual state councilor S. I. Despot-Zenovich, interfered with all good undertakings of the city assenizatsionny commission. The issue was resolved in less than 5 minutes, at the very end of the meeting, which lasted more than an hour, with only nine vowels of the Duma left in the hall of 19 people who came to the meeting that day. So only 9 people decided the fate of the fortress wall.

Demolition of this section of the fortress wall, over 105 running soot., Starting from Mikhailovskaya Street and to the Taghiyev Gate, was completed in 1884 and cost the town 3924 rubles. 64 kopecks

Thus, the demolition of the outer fortress wall, begun in 1883, by September 1888 was completed.

In October 1910, the mayor, Colonel P.I. Martynov informed the city mayor that under the existing laws it is strictly forbidden to destroy the remains of ancient fortresses, and offered to provide a detailed description of all damage to the wall for repair, and to ensure public safety against the possible collapse of the fortress wall, suggested taking the necessary measures.

At the beginning of the twentieth century, the military governor of Baku in 1868 applied to the Caucasus Military Department for the demolition of the fortress in order to renovate the city as a military defensive fortification. In 1870, the second wall of the castle was demolished.

The issue was raised again at the Summit in 1886, and it was decided that the door of the "Zulfugar Khan Gate" on the wall of the second castle was to be built next to the Shah Abbas gate, which was on the wall of the first fortress.

There is also a mythical defender of Baku fortress. According to the legend spread among people, the giant bull's positive aura protected the fortress. The bull was defended by two big lions. The Baku fortress has witnessed many historical events and defended the Shirvanshah state and the capital of the Baku khanate for a long time.

== Art depictions ==
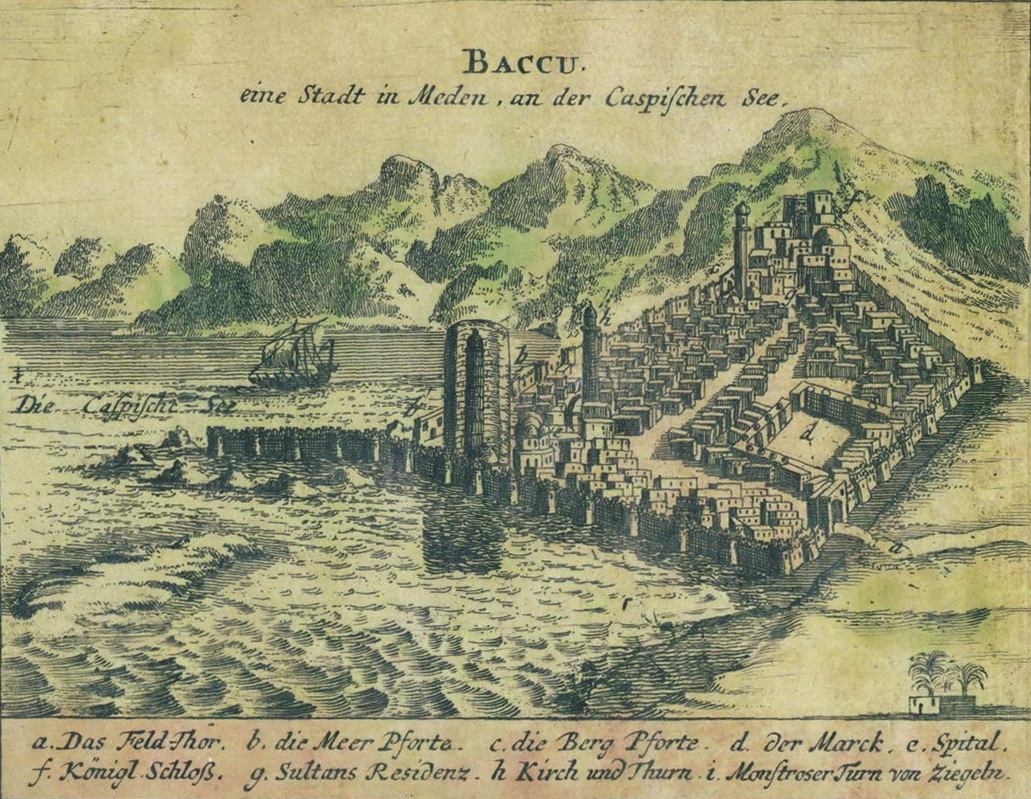
View of Baku by Engelbert (1630).

Icheri Sheher is depicted in the works of many artists. Monuments and the streets of the ancient city can be seen in the works of Engelbert Kaempfer, Aleksey Bogolyubov, Grigory Gagarin, Vasily Vereshchagin, Aleksandr Kuprin, Azim Azimzade, Tahir Salahov and other famous artists.

The general plan of Icheri Sheher is reflected on the opposite side of the Azerbaijani banknote of 10 manat.

== See also ==
- Baku
- Palace of the Shirvanshahs
- Old City (Baku)
- Tourism in Baku
- List of castles and fortresses in Azerbaijan
