= Zahir-al-Din Faryabi =

Iranian poet

Zahir-al-Din Abu-al-Fazl Tahir ibn Muhammad (Dari: ظهیرالدّین ابوالفضل طاهر بن محمد; c. 1156 – 1201) mostly known as Zahir Faryabi (Persian: ظهیر فاریابی) was a 12th-century Dari Persian poet.

He was born about 1156 (551 AH) in Faryab In Afghanistan, and was probably of Turkish blood. His works mostly consist of Qasidas for several Seljuq Emirs. He dedicated at least one poem to the Shirvanshah Akhsitan I. He died in 1201 in Tabriz.
