= Sallar of Shirvan =

Sallar
- Shah of Shirvan
- Reign: 1050 – 1063
- Predecessor: Bukhtnassar
- Successor: Fariburz I
- Died: 20 February 1063; Shamakhi
- Spouse: Unnamed daughter of Abu'l-Aswar Shavur I
- Issue: Fariburz; Guzhdaham
- House: Kasranids
- Father: Yazid II

Abu Shuja Salar was the fifteenth Shah of Shirvan. He was the uncle and successor of Bukhtnassar.

== Reign ==
Sallar was one of youngest sons of Yazid II. In 1049, Sallar rebelled against his nephew Bukhtnassar; he repelled him from Shamakhi, and thereafter had him captured and killed near Baylaqan, fortifying his rule.

He captured the Malugh castle (near modern Oghuz, Azerbaijan) and then had it rebuilt in 1053, building mosques and garrison around it.

He later died on 20 February 1063, and was succeeded by his energetic son Fariburz I, who was already taken over authority by large during his father's reign.

== Family ==
He was married to an unnamed daughter of Abu-l-Aswar Shavur I of Shaddadids. He had two sons:

1. Fariburz I (r. 1063 – 1096)
2. Guzdaham (d. 1072)

== Legacy ==
His coins were found elsewhere in modern Azerbaijan, minted in Shabran and Beylaqan. His laqabs in legends were described as al-Malik Abu-Shuja, al-Malik Muazzam, al-Malik al-Ajal al-Akhlal al-Munawwar Abu-Shuja and al-Malik Abu-Mansur, while honoring the Abbasid caliph al-Qadir.

An inscription bearing his name was found by Ilya Berezin in an old tower in Buzovna dating 1061 and is currently kept at Institute of Oriental Studies of the Russian Academy of Sciences.

== Sources ==
- Minorsky, Vladimir (1958). A History of Sharvān and Darband in the 10th-11th Centuries. Cambridge: W. Heffer and Sons. OCLC 5042566.

Sallar of Shirvan House of Shirvanshah Born: ? Died: 1063
Regnal titles
| Preceded by Bukhtnassar | Shirvanshah; 1050-1063 | Succeeded by Fariburz I |
