= Tamar (daughter of David IV) =

Queen consort of Shirvan

Tamar (Georgian: თამარი, romanized: tamari) (died after 1161) was a daughter of David IV, King of Georgia, and Queen consort of Shirvan as the wife of Shirvanshah Manuchihr III, whom she married c. 1112. She became a nun at the monastery of Tigva in Georgia in widowhood.

== Biography ==
Tamar's marriage to the shirvanshah is recorded by the 12th-century Life of the King of Kings David, part of the Georgian Chronicles, which eulogizes Tamar and her sister Kata, married to a Byzantine prince, as luminaries of the East and the West, respectively, reflect the splendor of their father. After her husband's death, Tamar returned to her native country and eventually became, in 1152, a nun at the monastery, which she had founded at Tigva in eastern Georgia, as indicated in the Georgian Chronicles as well as by an inscription from that monastery, first published by Marie-Félicité Brosset in 1851. The History of the Five Reigns, written around 1223, mentions Tamar's death as a nun in a passage which follows the record of the death of her brother Demetrius I (c. 1156), but she was still alive in 1161, when she met her nephew George III during his victorious campaign at Ani.

The modern historian O. Vil'chevsky has posited that Tamar's return to Georgia was precipitated by a political turmoil in Shirvan that followed Manuchihr's death. Tamar found herself involved in a power struggle among her sons, favoring the younger, who joined her in an attempt to unite Shirvan with Georgia with the help of Kipchak mercenaries. Manuchihr's older son Akhsitan I was able to secure support from the Eldiguzid dynasty of Azerbaijan, winning the contest for the throne and forcing Tamar and his younger brother into flight to Georgia. According to the historian Ziya Bunyadov, Manuchihr and Tamar had five sons—Akhsitan, Shahinshah, Paridun, Parruhzad, and an anonymous son who died in infancy—and two daughters, whose names have not come down to us. According to the genealogist Cyril Toumanoff, one of her sons, established in Georgia, was enfeoffed of Abkhazia and became forefather of the Sharvashidze family.
