= Yazid ibn Ahmad =

- Shah of Shirvan
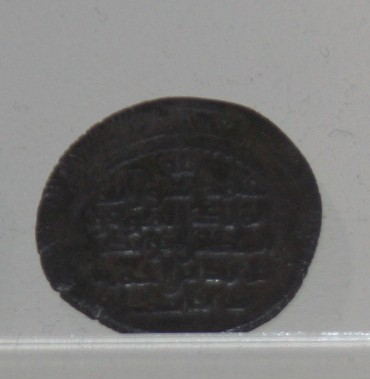
- Silver dirham of Yazid ibn Ahmad, from the Museum of History of Azerbaijan, Baku

Shirvanshah
- Reign: November 991 – 1027
- Predecessor: Muhammad III
- Successor: Manuchihr I

Emir of Derbent
- Reign: 1019 – 1021
- Predecessor: Mansur I
- Successor: Mansur I

Emir of Derbent
- Reign: 1023 – 1024
- Predecessor: Mansur I
- Successor: Mansur I
- Died: 1027
- Burial: Shabaran
- Issue: Manuchihr I Anushirvan; Ali II; Qubad; Shamkuya; Ahmad; Sallar; Mamlan ibn Yazid
- House: Yazidids
- Dynasty: Shirvanshah
- Father: Ahmad of Shirvan
- Religion: Islam

Yazid ibn Ahmad, also known as Yazid II, was the tenth Shirvanshah, ruling from November 991 until his death in 1027. A son of the Shirvanshah Ahmad, he succeeded his brother Muhammad III and reigned for about thirty-seven years, the greater part of them spent in an intermittent struggle for control of al-Bab. His reign is also the point at which the Yazidid house, Arab in origin, began to take Persian names of Sasanian type, a change reflected in the names of his sons Anushirvan and Manuchihr.

== Reign ==
Yazid's brother Muhammad III had been invited into al-Bab in 380/990 by its inhabitants after they expelled their amir Maymun, and had rebuilt and garrisoned the citadel before returning to his capital, where he died in Ramadan 381/November 991 after a reign of eleven years, eight months and twenty-one days. The government then passed to Yazid. Amir Maymun took advantage of the change of ruler to recapture al-Bab, and destroyed its middle wall (al-wastani) only a year and five months after it had been built.

In 382/992 a violent war broke out between the Shirvanians and the people called al-Shakari in the rustaq of Qabala. Musaddid ibn Habashi, the vizier of the lord of Shirvan, was killed, and with him perished four hundred horsemen belonging to the nobles of the Shirvanian army. Vladimir Minorsky noted that the form as written would mean "the mercenaries" (al-shakiriya), but strongly suspected that it should be read Shakawiya, "the people of Shakki", the same error occurring in the chapter on Arran. Wilferd Madelung likewise describes the engagement as a battle in which the Shirvanian army met the army of Shakki near the town, in consequence of the earlier conquest of Qabala by Muhammad III.

In 388/998 Yazid entrusted all the affairs of his state to Abd al-Aziz and Abd al-Samad, the sons of Abbas of Barda'a, and took decisions only on their suggestion. Ashurbeyli regards this as a defining feature of the reign: the Shirvanshah did not govern alone, but referred the business of the state to the two brothers and acted only on their advice.

In 389/999 Yazid made war on Abd al-Barr ibn Anbasa, the lord of Qabala and holder of the castle of Gurzul, and took the castle from him.

=== Struggle with Derbent ===
Later in 999 Yazid fought Lashkari ibn Maymun, the lord of al-Bab, over the ownership of the estate of Z.rqiya (according to Minorsky's reading, Rizqiya, from rizq, "daily bread"). Minorsky suggested that the estate may have been one of those assigned to the ghazis of al-Bab, though whether it is identical with the Marzuqiya mentioned earlier in the chronicle cannot be determined. The issue went against the Shirvanians, and Lashkari advanced on Shabaran; but the Shirvanians met him at the town gate and the men of al-Bab suffered an ignominious defeat, in which Lashkari's brother Abu-Nasr ibn Maymun was captured. Yazid imprisoned him, and after peace was made Abu-Nasr remained his hostage.

After Lashkari died in 391/1001 the people of al-Bab asked Yazid to surrender Abu-Nasr, whom they wished to make their amir. Yazid declined, saying that he wished to marry Abu-Nasr to his daughter and would do this and that for him, on the agreement between them that he should rebuild the citadel of al-Bab. The people of al-Bab refused the condition, and Yazid put Abu-Nasr to death although he bore no guilt. Abu-Nasr had been held in the castle of Shabaran, and the Shirvanshah buried him near its gate. This happened in 392/1002, and the people of al-Bab proclaimed Abu-Nasr's brother Mansur as amir.

The war between them continued with varying fortune (sijal) for nearly two decades. In 410/1019 the people of the marches rose against their amir Mansur, expelled him from the town and surrendered it to Yazid, who repaired the citadel and garrisoned it with his troops. The lord of Sarir, however, supported Mansur, and the people of al-Bab also came to favour him; Mansur accordingly entered al-Bab in 412/1021 and took the citadel from the Shirvanians. He then advanced on Shabaran, where several engagements were fought without either side gaining the victory, and the two armies returned home.

In 414/1023 the people of al-Bab expelled Mansur once more and entrusted their country to the Shirvanshah, who again restored the citadel. In Ramadan 415/November 1024 Mansur re-entered his country and after twenty days recaptured the citadel.

== Later reign ==
In 416/1025 Yazid's brother Haytham ibn Ahmad died in the "Estate of Muhammad" in Tabasaran. Minorsky found it noteworthy that the Shirvanshah's brother still resided in a village of Tabasaran, remarking that it shows how uncertain and entangled political frontiers were, owing to the private holdings of the princes. In the same year violent fighting broke out between the Shirvanshah and the sarrajiya; Minorsky suggested that these were the party of the saddlers, or else the people of a place called Siraj, or the descendants of a certain Suraqa. It is in Yazid's reign, he observed, that social unrest and the disloyalty of the inhabitants of the capital are heard of for the first time in the history of Shirvan.

=== Rebellion of Anushirvan ===
Also in 416/1025 Yazid's son Anushirvan, his lieutenant in Yazidiya (Shamakhi), rebelled against his father. Yazid had gone with the women of his household to the castle of Gurzul for amusement and hunting, and his son, profiting by the occasion, went into open revolt, followed by a large crowd of riff-raff. Anushirvan imposed a levy on his father's vizier Abd al-Aziz ibn Abbas, seized his property, looted his house and imprisoned him. His followers then fell to quarrelling and repented of what they had done, and secretly sent word to Yazid urging him to return. Yazid moved homewards in haste; the townspeople opened the gates and forsook his son. Anushirvan fled to the castle of Kastan (probably Gulistan) to seek safety, but the vizier pursued him, caught him on the road and handed him over to his father, who kept him in prison for some days and then let him die of hunger and thirst.

== Death and succession ==
Yazid ibn Ahmad died in 418/1027 after a reign of about thirty-seven years. He appears to have been buried at Shabaran, since his daughter Shamkuya, dying in October 1067, was laid beside her father there. He was succeeded by his son Manuchihr I, who in 420/1029 went to fight the people of al-Bab over the estate of Mujakabad belonging to Masqat.

== Legacy ==
Something occurred in the ruling house during Yazid's reign that the early sources do not record, but one consequence is unmistakable: after him the names of the Shirvanshahs change, and a return from Arabic to ancient Sasanian names begins, his own sons being called Anushirvan and Manuchihr. Minorsky observed that the source does not disclose the identity of Yazid's wife, but that the Iranian names prevailing among his sons are highly significant and suggest that the shah had established some link with a noble Iranian family: possibly that of Shabaran; this, he wrote, is the point at which the Arab origin of the Yazidids becomes obliterated by the influence of their surroundings.

The claim to Sasanian descent was older than the change of names: al-Mas'udi recorded in 332/943 that the Shirvanshah Muhammad ibn Yazid traced his line to Bahram Gur, which Ashurbeyli explains by an early marriage with one of the local rulers, probably the Shirvanshahs of Sasanian origin. As the caliphate declined and the Shirvanshahs' power grew, Minorsky argued, the dynasty on reviving needed to justify its prestige by noble descent, whereupon the old theory of kinship with the Sasanians came to the fore and its connection with the tribe of Shayban receded into the background.

== Family ==
He was probably married to a daughter of a local ruler from Shabaran. Four of Yazid's sons ruled Shirvan in turn after him, and the succession passed to his line for the rest of the century:

1. Anushirvan — rebelled in 1025 and died in prison
2. Manuchihr I (418–25/1027–34) — married to Sitt, daughter of the Shaddadid Fadl ibn Muhammad and sister of Musa ibn Fadl
3. Abu-Mansur Ali II (425–35/1034–43) — married Sitt after his brother's death
4. Qubad (435–41/1043–9)
5. Sallar (441–55/1049–63)— married to a daughter of the Shaddadid Abu'l-Aswar
6. Shamkuya — married to the amir of al-Bab Abd al-Malik II in December 1035, died in October 1067 in Gulistan, buried in Shabaran
7. Ahmad
  - Bukhtanassar Ali — succeeded his uncle Qubad in 441/1049 but was promptly overthrown by another uncle, Sallar; he fled, was captured and killed near Baylaqan
8. Mamlan — killed on the orders of his great-nephew Fariburz I on 24 February 1067

== Coinage ==
Two coins bearing the legend al-malik al-muwaffaq al-muzaffar Abu-Nasr Yazid b. Ahmad Sharvanshah are known, one of them also naming the caliph al-Qadir (381–422/991–1031). They were published in 1909 by A. K. Markov, who rightly took the ruler for a Mazyadid. Yevgeni Pakhomov ascribed to Yazid a further coin naming the caliph al-Ta'i, who reigned from AH 368 to 381; since it may have been struck in 381, Minorsky held that it does not necessarily disturb the chronology of the Ta'rikh al-Bab. He also suggested that the title Muzaffar, "victorious", given to Yazid on a coin may refer to one of the intermittent periods in which the Shirvanians occupied al-Bab.

== Sources ==
- Ashurbeyli, Sara (2007). Şirvanşahlar dövləti [The State of the Shirvanshahs] (in Azerbaijani) (4th ed.). Baku.
- Madelung, Wilferd (1975). "The minor dynasties of northern Iran". In Frye, R. N. (ed.). The Cambridge History of Iran, Volume 4: From the Arab Invasion to the Saljuqs. Cambridge: Cambridge University Press. pp. 198–249.
- Minorsky, Vladimir (1958). A History of Sharvān and Darband in the 10th-11th Centuries. Cambridge: W. Heffer & Sons.

Yazid ibn Ahmad House of Shirvanshah Born: ? Died: 1027
Regnal titles
Preceded by Muhammad III	Shirvanshah; 991–1027	Succeeded by Manuchihr I
