= Tigva Monastery =

Monastery in Tigva, Georgia

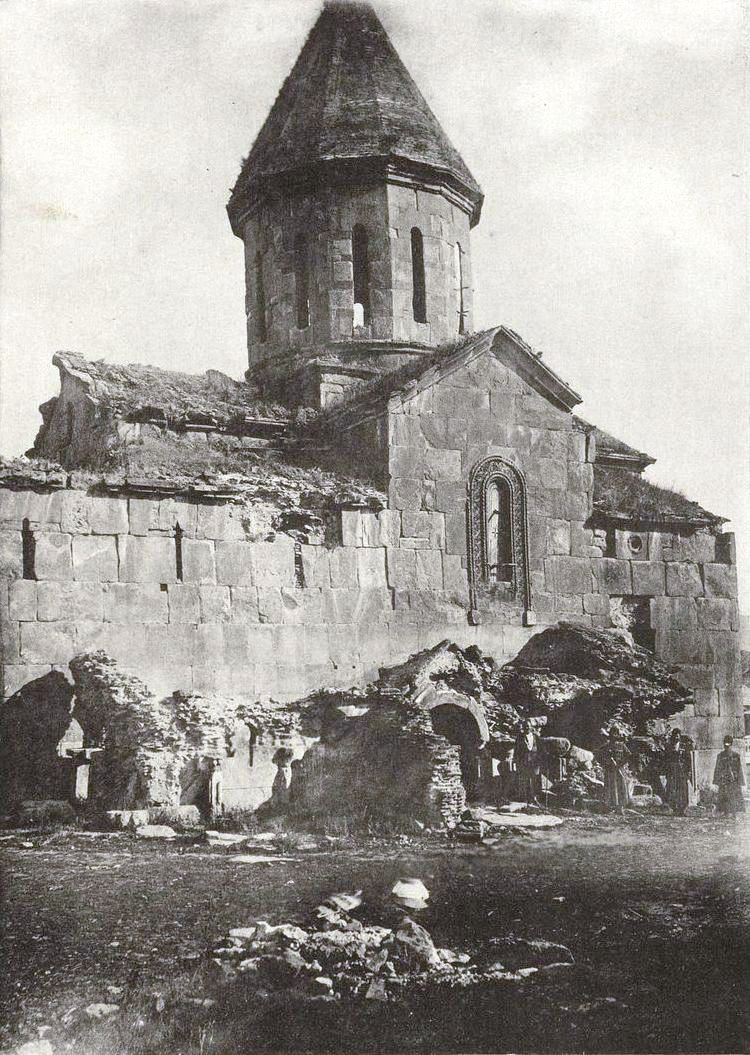
- The Tigva church, c. 1890

- Location within Georgia

Religion
- Affiliation: Georgian Orthodox Church

Location
- Location: Tigva, South Ossetia/Shida Kartli, Georgia
- Coordinates: 42.198333°N 43.760278°E

Architecture
- Type: cross-in-square church
- Completed: 1152

The Tigva Monastery of the Dormition of the Mother of God (Georgian: თიღვის მონასტერი) is a medieval Georgian Orthodox monastic church at the village of Tigva in the Prone river valley in what is now the disputed territory of South Ossetia. The monastery building is a domed cross-in-square design. It was founded by Tamar, daughter of King David IV of Georgia, who is commemorated in a Georgian inscription dated to 1152.

== History ==
The foundation of the Tigva church is mentioned in the Georgian chronicles and dated by the construction inscription to 1152. Its donor, or ktetor, was Tamar, daughter of the Georgian king David IV "the Builder" and the dowager-queen of Shirvan, who became a nun at Tigva and died there c. 1161. By the early 18th-century, a crisis in Georgia had taken its toll on the monastery: Prince Vakhushti of Kartli, in his Description of the Kingdom of Georgia, described the monastery at Tigva as "domed, elegant, beautifully built", but "without a priest". Several additional buildings surrounding the church, still extant in Vakhushti's times, were found in ruins by Countess Praskovya Uvarova during her visit in 1890. Shortly after Uvarova's visit, the church was repaired through the efforts of the priest Zedginidze, princes Amirejibi, and local peasants in 1890.

== Architecture ==
The monastery building, built of blocks of hewn reddish stone, is a well-preserved cross-domed church, inscribed in a rectangle, with the dimensions of 15 x 24 m. Noted for ascetic design and paucity of decorations, the church has the altar with an apse and three rectangular transept arms. The prothesis and diaconicon are also apsed. The dome rests upon wall corners of the apse on the east and two free-standing pillars on the west. The characteristic feature is the presence of narthex and choir on the west. The church has three entrances, to the north, south, and west. Mounted above the northern door is a Georgian inscription in the asomtavruli script, first published by Marie-Félicité Brosset in 1851. Its rhymed text mentions Tamar, a donor. The interior was once frescoed, but the murals are now barely discernible.

To the north-west of the main church building was a two-storey palace, built for Tamar. It was directly connected to the church gallery by means of a bridge through a door cut in the western part of the north wall.
