= Qubad of Shirvan =

Kubad
- Shirvanshah
- Reign: 1043–1049
- Predecessor: Ali II
- Successor: Bukhtnassar
- Died: 28 July 1049; Shamakhi
- House: Kasranid
- Father: Yazid II

Qubad (Persian: قباد) was the thirteenth Shah of Shirvan, a younger brother of his predecessor Ali II.

== Reign ==
His reign saw arrival of Seljuks in the region. He built a strong defense wall around Shamakhi in order to protect it from Oghuz invasions who were at the time already besieging Ganja. He reigned for 6 years and died on 28 July 1049.

He was succeeded by his nephew Bukhtnassar Ali. A daughter of his was married off to a Turkic warlord called Qara-Tegin by Fariburz I.

== Sources ==
- Madelung, W. (1975). "The Minor Dynasties of Northern Iran". In Frye, R. N. (ed.). The Cambridge History of Iran, Volume 4: From the Arab Invasion to the Saljuqs. Cambridge: Cambridge University Press. pp. 198–249. ISBN 978-0-521-20093-6.
- Minorsky, Vladimir (1958). A History of Sharvān and Darband in the 10th-11th Centuries. Cambridge: W. Heffer and Sons. OCLC 5042566.

Qubad of Shirvan House of Shirvanshah Born: ? Died: 1043
Regnal titles
Preceded by Ali II	Shirvanshah; 1043-1049	Succeeded by Bukhtnassar
