= Farrukhzad I =

Shirvanshah
- Reign: 1187–1203 – before 1225
- Predecessor: Akhsitan I
- Successor: Garshasp I
- Died: before 1225
- Dynasty: Kasranids
- Father: Manuchihr III

Farrukhzad I (Persian: فرخزاد یکم) was the Shirvanshah from between 1187–1203 to sometime before 1225.

== Reign ==
He ruled during a time in Shirvanshah history that scholarship has referred to "a period of total confusion", due to the lack of written records and contradictory numismatic evidence. He was a son of Shirvanshah Manuchihr III (r. 1120 – after 1160). He had had three brothers, Akhsitan I, Afridun II, and Shahanshah. An inscription from 1203 or 1204 mentions Farrukhzad I as the Shirvanshah. This means that Akhsitan I's reign ended between 1197 and 1203 or 1204.

Recent evidence suggests that Farrukhzad I did not rule beyond 1225. An inscription from a tower in Mardakan mentions both Farrukhzad I and his son Garshasp I, crediting the latter with the construction of the tower. The Armenian-American historian Dickran Kouymjian suggests that they may have ruled in different parts of the kingdom, with Farrukhzad I most likely ruling in Baku, which is close to Mardakan.

== Family ==
According to The Georgian Chronicles, around 1223 an unnamed Shirvanshah asked for the hand of the Georgian princess Rusudan, the sister of the king of Georgia, George IV (r. 1213–1223). The proposal was accepted, but was soon cancelled due to George IV's death, which occurred while he was en route to the ceremony. The unnamed Shirvanshah may have been Farrukhzad I, Garshasp I or Fariburz III.

He had at least two sons:

1. Garshasp (1204 – 1225)
2. Rashid (1221 – 1239)

== Sources ==
- Kouymjian, Dickran (1969). A Numismatic History of Southeastern Caucasia and Adharbayjan based on the Islamic Coinage of the 5th/11th to the 7th/13th Centuries. Columbia University.

Farrukhzad I Shirvanshah Died: before 1225
Regnal titles
Preceded by Akhsitan I	Shirvanshah; 1187–1203 – before 1225	Succeeded by Garshasp I
