= Fariburz II =

- Shah of Shirvan
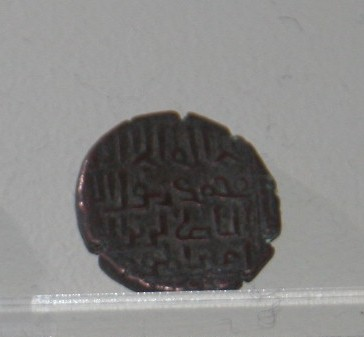
- Copper fulus of II Fariburz. Museum of History of Azerbaijan, Baku
- Reign: 1200 - 1204
- Coronation: 1200
- Predecessor: Shirvanshah Shahanshah
- Successor: Shirvanshah Farrukhzad I
- Born: ? Şamaxı
- Died: 1204; Şamaxı
Names
- Fariburz b. Afridun
- House: House of Shirvanshah
- Father: Shirvanshah Afridun II

Jalaladdunya Fariburz II was the 23rd Shirvanshah.

== Reign ==
Information about his reign does not exist. However coins minted on his name was found along with name of Caliph al-Nasir. Inscriptions on coins mentions his name as "al-Malik al-Adil Jalal-ad Dunya wal-Din Fariburz b. Afridun b. Manuchehr, Shirvanshah". These sumptuous titles gives hint that Shirvanshah was independent during Seljuq-Eldiguzid wars. He reigned after his uncle Shirvanshah Shahanshah, until 1204. He was succeeded by another uncle Shirvanshah Farrukhzad I. His issues are not mentioned anywhere.

Fariburz II House of Shirvanshah Born: ? Died: 1204
Regnal titles
Preceded by Shirvanshah Shahanshah	Shirvanshah; 1200 - 1204	Succeeded by Shirvanshah Farrukhzad I
