= Beylagan (city) =

Beyləqan Beyləqan
- City and municipality
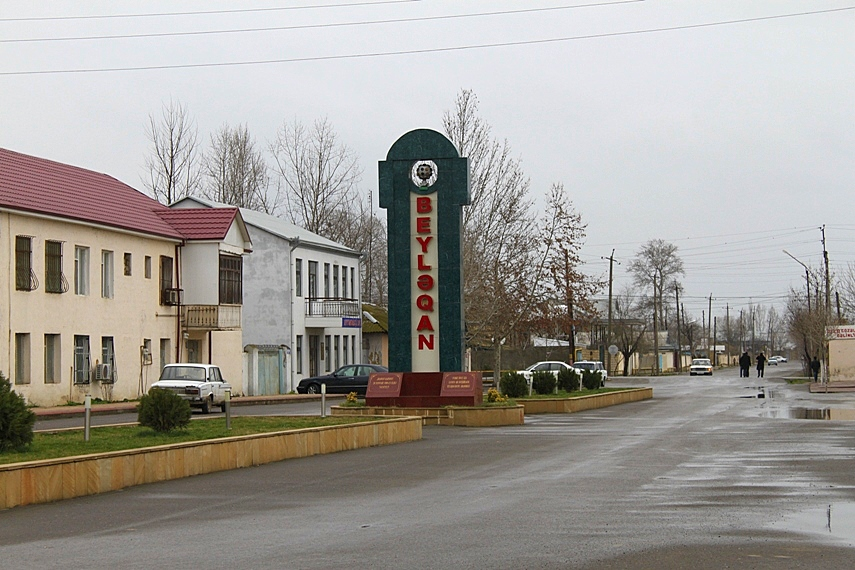

- Location within Azerbaijan
- Coordinates: 39°46′32″N 47°37′07″E
- Country: Azerbaijan
- District: Beylagan
- Founded: 1403
- Elevation: 60 m (200 ft)

Population (2012)
  - Total: 15 599
- Time zone: UTC+4 (AZT)
- Area code: +994 152
- Website: Official website

Beylagan (Azerbaijani: Beyləqan) is the administrative centre of the Beylagan District of Azerbaijan. During the Soviet era, it was renamed Zhdanovsk (Russian: Ждановск) after close Stalin associate Andrei Zhdanov. After the collapse of the Soviet Union, the city reverted in 1991 to its original name. Beylagan is one of the oldest towns in Azerbaijan. It is located in the triangle between the Kura and Aras rivers in the Mil plain.

== Economy ==
23 industrial enterprises were registered in the Beylagan region. In 2009, industrial enterprises of the region, as well as individuals, produced industrial products by 3.6 million AZN at actual prices. The volume of industrial production was 37% more than in the same period of 2006. Industrial products worth 3.7 million AZN were sent to consumers. Beylagan district is one of the important agricultural regions of the republic. The total area of the district is 113.113 hectares of land. 69.8 percent of the total land area, i.e. 78,920 hectares, are agricultural land. In addition, the area of the region called the "Blue Lake" - National Park 4,142 hectares, the canal and the road to 31,548 hectares of the Araz river bed under the 343 hectares of the border strip, including 37.213 hectares of land, there are lands of the state fund. Grain, cotton and livestock are the main areas of the region's economy. In addition, the farms grow potatoes, grapes, vegetables, melons and fruits. In 2010, the number of cattle in the region was 55,000 head, and the number of cattle was 290,000. During the year, 34,800 tons of milk were produced in the region.

== History ==
Beylagan is generally identified with the ancient Ören-kala settlement. Some historians associate Beylagan with Paytakaran, a city which served as a major military-political hub between the 6th and 7th-centuries. However, other historians consider Paytakaran to be a separate city, located 7–8 km southeast of Oren-kala. Beylagan was reportedly founded by the Sasanian monarch Kavad I (r. 488–496, 498/9–531). The Russian orientalist Vladimir Minorsky considered the name "Beylagan" (most likely Bēl-ākān) to be connected to Baylaman (Bel-mān, "home of the Bel-s") in Gilan. He considered the name to be an indication that Beylagan had received Iranian settlers from mostly Gilan, as well as other areas south of the Caspian Sea. In the sixth century 'Paidangaran' (as its name is recorded in Syriac) was a diocese of the Assyrian Church of the East, two of whose bishops are known. During the Muslim conquests, Beylagan reportedly surrendered to the Arab commander Salman ibn Rabiah (died 650) without putting up any resistance. Beylagan is mentioned by medieval geographers as a modest but thriving town, well-known for its cloth and a form of confectionery named nāṭef.

In the 12th century, the city had to pay tribute to Georgia and was sacked in 1220 by the Mongols, who slaughtered the inhabitants and burned it down. However, survivors subsequently returned and rebuilt it. At the end of the 14th century, the city was destroyed by Timur, who later rebuilt it, but the city was abandoned. Its ruins are now known as Ören-kala and lie near Kabirli village, a 22 km drive from the modern city of Beylagan.

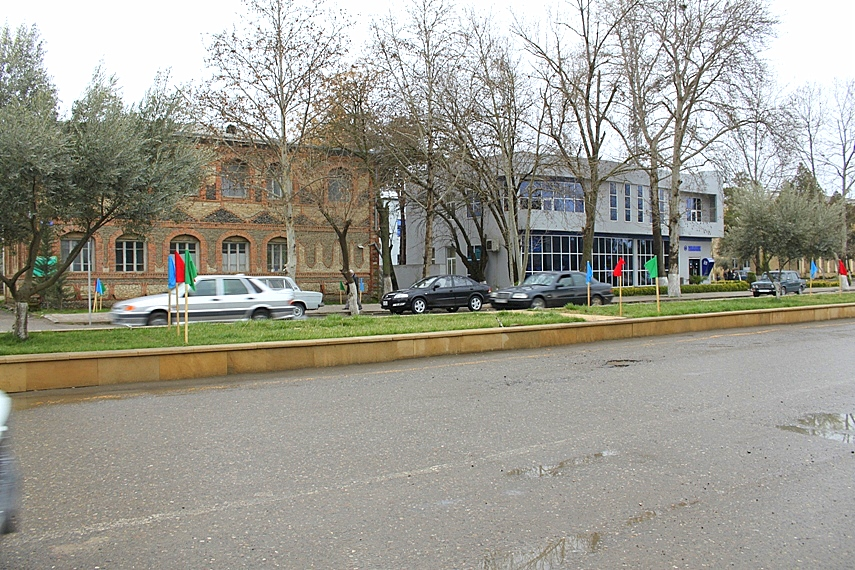
City administrative center of the Beylagan region.

== See also ==
- Beylagan District

== Sources ==
- Bosworth, C. E. (1989). "Baylaqān". In Yarshater, Ehsan (ed.). Encyclopædia Iranica. Vol. IV/1: Bāyju–Behruz. London and New York: Routledge & Kegan Paul. p. 2. ISBN 978-0-71009-124-6.
- Fiey, Jean Maurice (1993). Pour un Oriens Christianus Novus: Répertoire des diocèses syriaques orientaux et occidentaux. Beirut: Orient-Institut. ISBN 9783515057189.
- Gadjiev, Murtazali (2017). "Construction Activities of Kavād I in Caucasian Albania". Iran and the Caucasus. 21 (2). Brill: 121–131. doi:10.1163/1573384X-20170202.
- Minorsky, Vladimir (1958). A History of Sharvān and Darband in the 10th-11th Centuries. Cambridge: W. Heffer & Sons, Ltd.
