= Dickran Kouymjian =

American historian and academic

- Տիգրան Գույումճեան
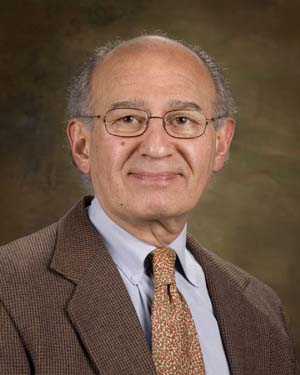
- Born: June 6, 1934; Romania
- Awards: Order of St. Mesrop Mashtots

Dickran Kouymjian (Armenian: Տիգրան Գույումճեան; born 6 June 1934) is an Armenian-American writer, publisher, editor, historian and professor.

== Life ==
Kouymjian was born to Armenian parents in Romania on June 6, 1934. At the time of his birth, his parents already had U.S. citizenship. Kouymjian went on to study European cultural history from the University of Wisconsin. He attained his master's degree in Arabic studies at the American University of Beirut. He gained his PhD in Armenian Studies from Columbia University in 1969 becoming the first person to ever do so. In 1977 he was invited to Fresno to establish an Armenian Studies program at the Cal State University of Fresno. While at CSUF, Kouymjian founded Hye Sharzhoom, an Armenian student newspaper which continues to function till this day.

Dr. Kouymjian was until retirement the Haig and Isabel Berberian Professor of Armenian Studies at the California State University, Fresno. He has taught at many universities including Columbia, the American University in Cairo, Haigazian University in Beirut, the Sorbonne in Paris, and served as the William Saroyan Visiting Professor of Armenian Studies at the University of California at Berkeley in 1996. In 1987 he was a senior lecturer of foreign languages and literature at the Yerevan State University in Armenia. Kouymjian is a foreign member of the Armenian National Academy of Sciences. He has also served as a consultant to UNESCO.

He has published more than three hundred articles and several books.

He is married to Angèle Kapoïan who is also a scholar and teacher.

He announced his retirement in 2008 after 31 years of service to California State University, Fresno.

== Awards and honors ==
- Catholicos of All Armenians Karekin II honored Kouymjian with the St. Sahag and St. Mesrob Mashtots Medal.
- 1986 – California State University, Fresno – Most Outstanding Professor Award.
- 1998 – Provost's Award for Excellence in Research.
- 1999–2000 – Armenian National Committee Central Valley – Man of the Year Award.
- 1999 – Phi Kappa Phi – University Scholar of the Year.
- 2003 – Armenian Students Association of America – Arthur H. Dadian Armenian Heritage Award.
- A Festschrift, "Between Paris and Fresno: Armenian Studies in Honor of Dickran Kouymjian," edited by Barlow Der Mugrdechian, was published by Mazda Publishing in 2008, honoring the career of Dickran Kouymjian.

== Notable works ==
- Artsakh: Garden of Armenian Arts and Traditions – Karabagh (2012)
- Mxitar (Mekhithar) of Ani on the rise of the Seljuqs (1969)
- Chinese elements in Armenian miniature painting in the Mongol period (1986)
- The Arts of Armenia (1992)
- Armenian Architecture: An Exhibition (1981)
