= Farrukhzad II =

- Shah of Shirvan
- Reign: 1260 - 1282
- Predecessor: Akhsitan II
- Successor: Akhsitan III
- Died: c. 1282
- Issue: Akhsitan III; Kayqubad I
- House: Kasranid
- Father: Akhsitan II

Farrukhzad II was the 28th ruler of Shirvan. He was a son of Akhsitan II who was executed by Hulagu in 1260.

== Reign ==
No numismatic evidence of his reign exists. He was probably a nominal ruler under Yoshmut, Mongol Viceroy of Arran and Azerbaijan under Hulagu and Abaqa. However, he left an epigraphic evidence dating 1266 with the title "As-sultan al-azim Abu-l-Fath Farrukhzad ibn Akhsitan ibn Fariburz ibn Garshasf" in a mosque of Pir Husayn Khanqah. Another epigraphic mention of him was on Bibi-Heybat Mosque dated 1281.

Farrukhzad II House of Shirvanshah Born: ? Died: 1282
Regnal titles
Preceded by Shirvanshah Akhsitan II	Shirvanshah; 1260 - 1282	Succeeded by Shirvanshah Akhsitan III
