= Akhsitan II =

- Shah of Shirvan
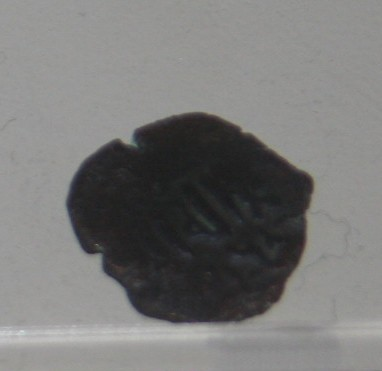
- Copper fulus of II Ahsitan. Museum of History of Azerbaijan, Baku
- Reign: 1243/1255 - 1260
- Predecessor: Fariburz III
- Successor: Farrukhzad II
- Died: 1260
- Issue: Farrukhzad II
- House: Kasranid
- Father: Fariburz III

Jalal ad-din Akhsitan was the 27th Shirvanshah.

== Reign ==
Zakariya al-Qazwini described him as "ruler of independent region of Shirvan" in his Aja'ib al-Makhluqat. He accepted overlordship of Mongols as his coins dating 1256 and 1258 mention Möngke Khagan's name.

His name was also mentioned on a semi-ruined building dated 1257 located between Nağaraxana and Talışnuru villages of Shamakhi. According to Ibn al-Fuwati, he was executed by the order of Hulagu in 1260.

Akhsitan II House of Shirvanshah Born: ? Died: 1260
Regnal titles
Preceded by Shirvanshah Fariburz II	Shirvanshah; 1243 - 1260	Succeeded by Shirvanshah Farrukhzad II
