= Kasranids =

Branch of the Shirvanshahs

- Parent family: Yazidids
- Founded: 991
- Founder: Yazid ibn Ahmad
- Final ruler: Hushang of Shirvan
- Titles: Shirvanshah; Emir of Derbent
- Connected families: Yazidids; Sharvashidze; Darbandids
- Dissolution: 1382

The Kasranids (Persian: سلسله کسرانی) were a branch of the Shirvanshahs, who ruled the Shirvan region for 387 years. The word "Kasra" was derived from legendary king Kai Khosrow of Iran, reflecting a shift in naming tradition from Arabic to Persian and it was part of an effort to break with their Arabic roots by claiming to be successors of the Sasanians and the Kayanian dynasty.

== Reign ==
Yazid II of Shirvan was accepted as the last of the Mazyadid dynasty and first of the Kasranids. He fathered eight children, five of which are named according to Persian customs. The Kasranids managed to establish alliances with the Bagrationi dynasty by marriage and with the Emirate of Derbent (whose line they would eventually absorb into the crown). They survived main powers in the region, notably the Seljuqs, the Ilkhanate, the Chupanids, and lastly, the Jalayirids as a vassal or tributary state. Shirvanshah Hushang was the last member of Kasranids. They were succeeded by House of Derbent, which was a junior branch of the Kasranids itself. Shervashidze is thought to be an early junior branch of Kasranids.

== Family tree ==
Rulers are shown with crown. Notable dynastic alliances are shown.

- Yazid ibn Ahmad (991 – 1027) (m. a daughter of a ruler of Shabaran.)
  - Anushirwan (d. c. 1025)
  - Manuchihr I (1027 – 1034) (m. Sitt b. Fadl)
    - Hormuzd, Tabasaranshah (d. 9 April 1065)
  - Ali II (1034 – 1043) (m. Sitt b. Fadl)
  - Qubad (1043 – 1049)
  - Shamkuya (m. Abd al-Malik II of Derbent in December 1035, d. October 1067, Gulistan)
  - Ahmad ibn Yazid
    - Ali III
  - Sallar (1050 – 1063) (m. a daughter of Abu'l-Aswar Shavur ibn Fadl)
    - Guzdaham (d. 1072)
    - Fariburz I (1063 – 1096) (m. a daughter of Tokku of Sarir)
      - Manuchihr II (1096 – 1106)
      - Afridun I (1106–1120)
        - Manuchihr III (1120 – 1160) (m. Tamar)
          - Akhsitan I (c. 1160 – 1204) (m. ‘Ismatu’d-Din Safwatud-Din Safwat’l-Islam)
            - Fariburz
            - Iljik
            - Manuchihr (fl. 1188)
          - Afridun II (c. 1160)
          - Shahanshah (c. 1180 – 1203)
          - Farrukhzad I (c. 1187-1203 – 1225)
            - Garshasp (d. 1234)
              - Fariburz III (1225 – 1255)
                - Akhsitan II (1255 – 1260)
                  - Farrukhzad II (1260 – c. 1282)
                    - Akhsitan III (1282 – 1294)
                      - Siamerk
                      - Key Kavus I (c. 1294 – 1397)
                    - Key Qubad (c. 1317 – 1348)
                      - Kavus or Keykavus II (1348 – 1372)
                        - Nodar (fl. 1357)
                        - Hushang (1372 – 1382)
                      - Sultan Muhammad — ancestor of Darbandid branch, governor of Derbent, father of Ibrahim I
              - Jalal al-Din Sultanshah (fl. 1226)
            - Rashid (fl. 1221-1225)
          - Ancestor of House of Sharvashidze
  - Mamlan ibn Yazid (d. 24 February 1067)

== Legacy ==
The Kasranid kings were patrons of arts. Malu castle was erected by order of Shirvanshah Salar. Siniggala mosque was one of the major works completed during the reign of Shirvanshah Fariburz. Pir Husayn Khanqah, one of the most unusual buildings of Shirvan architecture, was built under order of Shirvanshah Afridun I. The Gates of Baku were constructed during the reign of Shirvanshah Manuchehr III. His son, Akhsitan I continued building several castles and making reforms among Round tower of Mardakan, Quadrangular tower of Mardakan, Ramana Tower. He was also responsible for changing the capital from Shamakhy to Baku after a devastating earthquake in 1192 (it has remained a prominent city in the region and is now the capital of Azerbaijan).

Many poets, including Nizami, Khaqani, Arif Ardabili, Falaki Shirvani, Jamal Khalil Shirvani, lived in the court of Kasranids.

== Popular media ==
Ilgar Aliyev, an Azerbaijani writer, published an historical fiction novel The Secret and the Key in 2012, which alluded to the lives of Shirvanshah Manuchehr III and his family. The novel was dedicated to Nizami Ganjavi's 870th jubilee. Aliyev claimed that Majnun was a son of Akhsitan I and Layla, a daughter of a wali of Baku. The novel goes on to claim that Nizami wrote Layla and Majnun in their honor and that the Maiden Tower was built in memory of Majnun. The novel received criticism because there is little historical evidence for these claims.

The Kasranids are a playable dynasty in both Crusader Kings II and Crusader Kings III.

== Sources ==
- Minorsky, Vladimir (1958). A History of Sharvān and Darband in the 10th-11th Centuries. Cambridge: W. Heffer and Sons. OCLC 5042566.
