= Akhsitan III =

- Shah of Shirvan
- Reign: 1282 – 1294
- Predecessor: Farrukhzad II
- Successor: Keykavus I
- Issue: Keykavus I Siamerk
- House: Kasranid
- Father: Farrukhzad II

Akhsitan III was the 29th ruler of Shirvan, now part of Azerbaijan. He is thought to be the son of Shirvanshah Farrukhzad II.

== Life ==
No numismatic source mentions his name. His existence is proposed on the details of a legend in Safvat as-safa, a work by Ibn Bazzaz who mentions Akhsitan as ruler of Shirvan. According to legend, Shah wanted to marry his daughter to Safavid sheikh Safi-ad-din Ardabili with a dowry of 14,000 dinar and a water canal, to which Safi al-Din reportedly replied "How can I reply to that? Shirvanshah is the ruler, and I am just a dervish". Since Safi-ad-din Ardabili was born in 1252, he couldn't have married a daughter of Akhsitan II, about whom after 1260, there is no details. Therefore, it was proposed that there should be another, a third Akhsitan. According to the legend, seeing Safiaddin's tutor and future father-in-law Zahed Gilani's influence over Shirvani people Akhsitan began to oppose religious Sufi orders, saying religious people are not working in fields.

Another reasoning given for his existence is an inscription dated June 1294 on Pir Huseyn Khanqah, which mentions "Keykavus b. Akhsitan".

=== Death ===
In Safvat as-safa, it is also reported that Akhsitan died of mental illness in Gushtasfi, while his son Siamerk was executed on the orders of Arghun Khan on the instigation of Akhsitan himself. He was probably succeeded by his other son - Keykavus.

Akhsitan III House of Shirvanshah Born: ? Died: 1294
Regnal titles
Preceded by Farrukhzad II	Shirvanshah; 1282 – 1294	Succeeded by Keykavus I
