= Bahlul of Shirvan =

15th-century Shirvanshah commander

Bahlul
- Commander of Shirvanshah army
- Full name: Sheikh Bahlul ibn Sultan Muhammad Darbandi
- Buried: Baku
- Noble family: House of Shirvanshah
- Issue: Tahmuras of Shirvan
- Father: Prince Sultan Muhammad
- Mother: ?
- Occupation: General

Sheikh Bahlul Darbandi was a member of the House of Shirvanshah, the ruling dynasty of Shirvan. He was a grandson of Shirvanshah Keykubad I, brother of Shirvanshah Ibrahim, and cousin of Shirvanshah Kavus.

== Life ==
The exact date of his birth is not known. He spent his childhood with his brother and father in a village in the Shaki region, in hiding. During the reign of his brother, Shirvanshah Ibrahim, he was appointed chief commander of the Shirvan army. He commanded the main body of the Shirvanese army during its defeat at the Battle of Chalagan (1412); he was captured, and held prisoner by the opposing commander, Qara Yusuf. He was freed on payment of 200 Iranian toman in ransom by a noble from Tabriz, Sheikh Ahi Gassab. His exact date of death is not known. His was succeeded by his son Tahmuras of Shirvan in the post of chief commander.
