= Keykavus (Shirvanshah) =

Shirvanshah Keykavus
- Shah of Shirvan
- Reign: c. 1294 - 1317
- Predecessor: Akhsitan III
- Successor: Kayqubad
- House: Kasranid
- Father: Akhsitan III

Keykavus (Persian: کیکاوس) was the 30th ruler of Shirvan. He was the second son of Akhsitan III.

He was mentioned as "Malik" in an inscription on Pir Husayn Khanqah dated June 1294. He hasn't left any numismatic evidence. According to disputed Letters of Rashid-al-Din Hamadani, his daughter was married to Rashidaddin's eldest son Amir Ali and describes him as "the ruler of Shabaran and Shamakhi" and even invited him to his estate in Fathabad. Otherwise, he is not known to historiography.

Keykavus (Shirvanshah) House of Shirvanshah
Regnal titles
Preceded by Akhsitan III	Shirvanshah; 1294 - 1317	Succeeded by Kayqubad
