= Prince Sultan Muhammad =

Sultan Muhammad
- Wali of Derbent
- Noble family: Kasranid
- Issue: Ibrahim I of Shirvan; Bahlul of Shirvan
- Father: Kayqubad

Sultan Muhammad (Persian: سلطان محمد) was a member of the Kasranid branch of Shirvanshah dynasty, as well as the ancestor of Darbandid branch of the family.

== Life ==
His exact dates of birth and death are not known. He was a son of Kayqubad, and brother of Kavus I, and father of Ibrahim I of Shirvan and Bahlul of Shirvan.

He was probably made governor of Derbent during the reign of his father Kayqubad I. According to a story by Aḥmad Ḡaffāri Qazvini, author of Tāriḵ-e jahānārā dedicated to Tahmasp I, during the reign of his cousin Hushang (or his uncle Kavus), he was disgraced and forced to take refuge and hide in the Shaki region with his sons, dying there.

== Sources ==
- Minorsky, Vladimir (1958). A History of Sharvān and Darband in the 10th-11th Centuries. Cambridge: W. Heffer and Sons. OCLC 5042566.
