= Prince Rashid ibn Farrukhzad =

Rashid
- Wali of Derbent; Shirvanshah
- Reign: 1221 – 1225
- Died: probably Derbent
- Issue: A son
- House: Kasranid
- Father: Farrukhzad I

Rashid — was a governor of Derbent during invasions of Jebe and Subutai (c. 1221). He was a younger brother of Garshasp.

== Tenure ==
According to Ibn al-Athir and Kirakos Gandzaketsi, he defended the city against Mongol armies successfully and forced them to pass Caucasus via alternative ways. However, he failed to defend himself against Kipchaks and fled to possibly Shamakhi (according to Ziya Bunyadov).

In 1225, he applied to the help of Rusudan of Georgia to retake Derbent. The ensuing battle led by Rashid and his son was lost. According to Dickran Kouymjian and Ziya Bunyadov he may even be a Shirvanshah in his own right.

Rashid is a character that appears on Tom Shanley's novel, Dominion: Dawn of the Mongol Empire.

== Sources ==
- Kouymjian, Dickran (1969). A Numismatic History of Southeastern Caucasia and Adharbayjan based on the Islamic Coinage of the 5th/11th to the 7th/13th Centuries. Columbia University.

== Links ==
- Tom Shanley - Dominion: Dawn of the Mongol Empire, 2008
