= Kayqubad I of Shirvan =

Kayqubad
- Shah of Shirvan
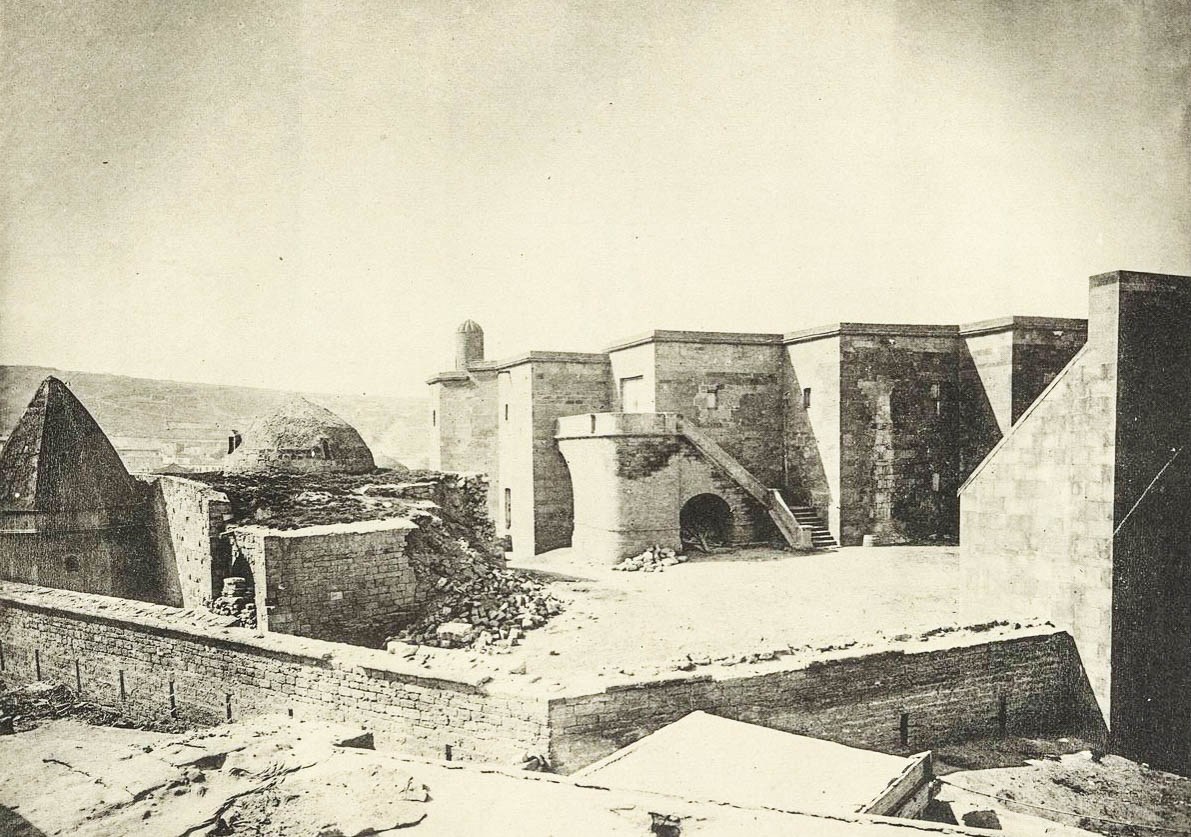
- Photo of Keygubad Mosque by Richard Tile, end of 19th century
- Reign: c. 1317 – c. 1348
- Predecessor: Keykavus
- Successor: Kavus
- Died: c. 1348
- Issue: Kavus; Sultan Muhammad
- House: Kasranid
- Father: Farrukhzad II

Kayqubad (Persian: کیقباد یکم, died 1348) was the 31st ruler of Shirvan.

== Reign ==
His rule was dominated by Chobanid overlordship. According to Munejjimbashi, he was a son of Farrukhzad II. According to Sara Ashurbeyli, this view was shared by other historians like Bakikhanov, Bidlisi, Rumlu and others. Zambaur and Barthold proposed 1317 as start date for Kayqubad's reign, however there is no concrete evidence for this.

According to Abd al-Razzaq Samarqandi, Malek Ashraf offered to take her daughter's hand, however his son Kavus, who was already in a position of co-ruler refused this. His name disappears from records around 1348, which is considered his possible death date.

Keygubad Mosque is considered to be made on his order.

== Family ==
He had at least three children:

- Kavus (r. 1348 – 1372)
- Sultan Muhammad — ancestor of Darbandid branch, governor of Derbent, father of Ibrahim I
- A daughter

== Sources ==
- Minorsky, Vladimir (1958). A History of Sharvān and Darband in the 10th-11th Centuries. Cambridge: W. Heffer and Sons. OCLC 5042566.

Kayqubad I of Shirvan House of Shirvanshah Born: ? Died: 1348
Regnal titles
Preceded by Shirvanshah Keykavus I	Shirvanshah; 1317 - 1348	Succeeded by Shirvanshah Kavus
