= Mansur Beg (governor of Derbent) =

Governor in Safavid Iran (1509)

Mansur Beg was a Safavid official, who served as the first Safavid governor (hakem) of Derbent (Darband), in 1509, during the reign of king Ismail I (r. 1501-1524). Following his brief tenure, he was succeeded by members of the Shirvanshah family who governed the city under Safavid suzerainty, usually through castellans, until 1538. After that, directly appointed Safavid officials came to govern it again.

== Sources ==
- Fisher, William Bayne; Avery, P.; Hambly, G. R. G; Melville, C., eds. (1986). The Cambridge History of Iran. Vol. 6. Cambridge: Cambridge University Press. pp. 212, 245. ISBN 978-0521200943.
- Floor, Willem M. (2008). Titles and Emoluments in Safavid Iran: A Third Manual of Safavid Administration, by Mirza Naqi Nasiri. Washington, DC: Mage Publishers. pp. 175, 284. ISBN 978-1933823232.
