= Hushang of Shirvan =

Hushang
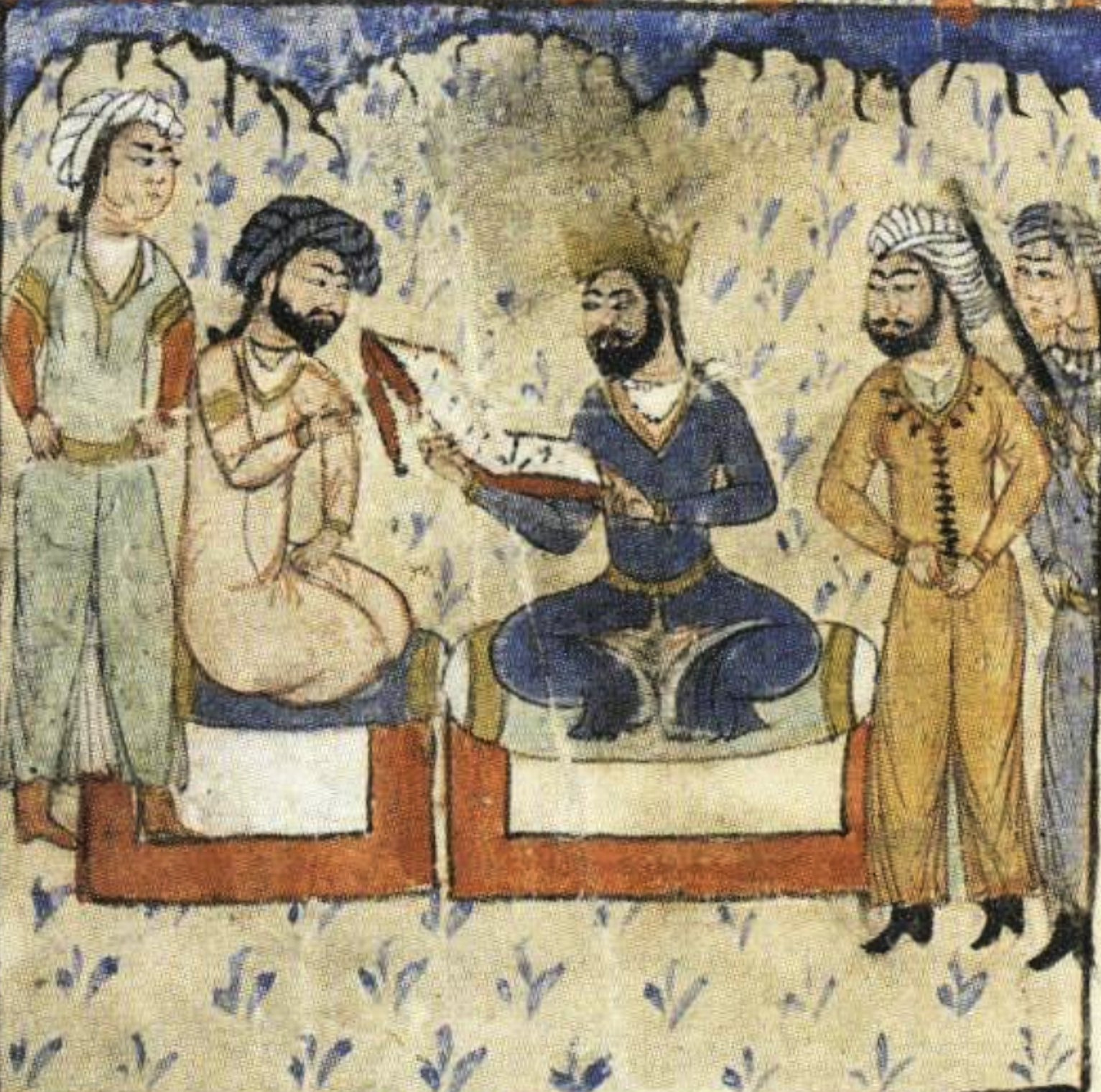
- Miniature depicting Hushang being shown the Farhad u Shirin by its author Muhammad ibn Muhammad al-Arif Ardabili. Stored in the Topkapı Palace in Istanbul.

Shirvanshah
- Reign: c. 1372 – 1382
- Predecessor: Kavus I
- Successor: Ibrahim I
- Died: 1382
- Dynasty: Kasranid
- Father: Kavus
- Religion: Sunni Islam

Hushang (Persian: هوشنگ) was the Shirvanshah from 1372/73 to 1382.

== Life ==
He was the son and successor of Kavus, under whom the Shirvanshah kingdom came under the rule of the Jalayirid Sultanate (1335–1432). Hushang himself was brought up in court of Shaykh Uways as a hostage and was released as soon as his father died.

He didn't resist and possibly preferred guerilla warfare against Shah Mansur who was tasked with conquering Shirvan as a part of Shah Shoja Mozaffari's invasion of Azerbaijan in 1375. He continued to mint coins with legends mentioning Jalayirid overlords like Shaikh Hussain Jalayir and Ahmad Jalayir throughout his reign. According to Munejjimbashi, he reconciled brothers who escaped to Arran in fear of the powerful 'Adil Aqa, the governor of Ray.

Hushang was killed by his subjects in 1382, thus marking the end of the Kasranid branch of the dynasty. He was succeeded by Ibrahim I (r. 1382–1417), his cousin. This marked the start of the Darbandi line.

== Legacy ==
The poet Muhammad ibn Muhammad al-Arif Ardabili dedicated his Persian masnavi (poem written in rhyming couplets) Farhad u Shirin to Hushang. A miniature copy depicting this event is stored in the Topkapı Palace in Istanbul.

== Sources ==
- Barthold, W. & Bosworth, C.E. (1997). "S̲h̲īrwān S̲h̲āh". In Bosworth, C. E.; van Donzel, E.; Heinrichs, W. P. & Lecomte, G. (eds.). The Encyclopaedia of Islam, Second Edition. Volume IX: San–Sze. Leiden: E. J. Brill. pp. 488–489. ISBN 978-90-04-10422-8.
- Çağman, Fílíz; Tanindi, Zeren (2011). "Selections from Jalayirid Books In the Libraries of Istanbul" (PDF). Muqarnas. 28: 243, Fig.24. ISSN 0732-2992. JSTOR 23350289.
- Minorsky, Vladimir (1958). A History of Sharvān and Darband in the 10th-11th Centuries. W. Heffer & Sons, Ltd.

Hushang of Shirvan Shirvanshah Died: 1382
Regnal titles
Preceded by Kavus I	Shirvanshah; 1372/73 – 1382	Succeeded by Ibrahim I
