= Fariburz III =

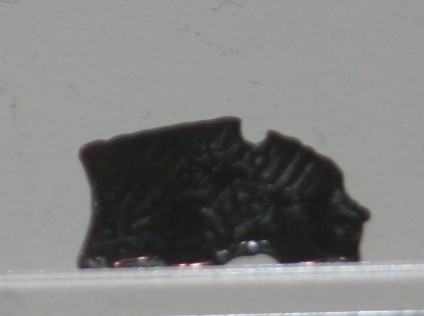
- Copper fulus of Fariburz III, located in the Museum of History of Azerbaijan, Baku

Shirvanshah
- Reign: c. 1225–1255
- Predecessor: Garshasp I
- Successor: Akhsitan II
- Died: 1255
- Issue: Akhsitan II
- Dynasty: Kasranids
- Father: Garshasp I

Fariburz III (Persian: فریبرز) was the Shirvanshah from c. 1225 to 1255. He ruled during a time in Shirvanshah history that scholarship has referred to "a period of total confusion", due to the lack of written records and contradictory numismatic evidence.

== Reign ==
Based on numismatic evidence, it was initially suggested that Fariburz III's father Garshasp I did not rule after 1225. However, new evidence suggests that Garshasp I's reign was longer. The numismatist Blau discovered a unique coin with the name of Garshasp I, and which mentions the Abbasid caliph al-Mustansir I, who ruled from 1226 to 1242. Moreover, a newly found inscription from another tower in Mardakan suggests that Garshasp I was still living by 1233/34, and perhaps also still ruling. This new evidence suggests that Garshasp I ruled jointly with his son Fariburz III. Fariburz may have ruled an area outside the capital until his father's death. Another theory is that Fariburz was given control over the central government by Garshasp I, who withdrew to Baku region.

Fariburz accepted suzerainty of the Khwarazmshah Jalal al-Din Mangburni in 1226, during his invasion of Caucasus. Shirvan along with the rest of the Caucasus was conquered by the Mongol Empire between 1235–1239. It is unknown if there were other ruling Shirvanshahs at the time of Fariburz III's death.

He was succeeded by his son Akhsitan II.

== Legacy ==
The 13th-century Persian anthology Nozhat al-Majales of Jamal al-Din Khalil Shirvani was dedicated to Fariburz III. The work demonstrates the broad distribution of the Persian language and Iranian culture in the northwestern Iranian regions of Arran, Azerbaijan and Shirvan. Pir Huseyn Khanqah was built during Fariburz's reign. He also raised Sabayil Castle near Baku in 1223/4.

== Sources ==
- Kouymjian, Dickran (1969). A Numismatic History of Southeastern Caucasia and Adharbayjan based on the Islamic Coinage of the 5th/11th to the 7th/13th Centuries. Columbia University.
- Riahi, Mohammad Amin (2008). "Nozhat al-majāles". Encyclopaedia Iranica.

Fariburz III House of Shirvanshah Died: 1255
Regnal titles
| Preceded by Garshasp I | Shirvanshah c. 1225–1255 | Succeeded by Akhsitan II |
