= Pirsaatçay =

Coordinates: 40°09′11″N 49°01′05″E

Pirsaatçay is a village in the municipality of Qubalıbalaoğlan in the Hajigabul Rayon of Azerbaijan.
