= Pir Huseyn Khanqah =

13th-century Sufi shrine complex in Hajigabul District, Azerbaijan

- Pir Hüseyn xanəgahı
- Modern view of the khanqah, 2024

- Location in Azerbaijan

Religion
- Affiliation: Islam
- Branch/tradition: Sufism (Qalandariyya)
- Status: Shrine; historic monument

Location
- Location: Qubalıbalaoğlan, Hajigabul District
- Country: Azerbaijan
- Coordinates: 40°9′12.92688″N 49°0′28.41498″E

Architecture
- Architects: Shahzada Habibullah ibn Sheikh Hajji Muhammad; Shams al-Din Muhammad ibn Abi al-Abbas (minaret)
- Type: Khanqah and mausoleum
- Style: Shirvan–Absheron; Ilkhanid interior decoration
- Funded by: Sharaf al-Dawla wa'l-Din Hasan ibn Muhammad ibn Barwandi
- Established: c. 1203
- Completed: 1243–44 (complex); 1256–57 (minaret); 1266–67 (stucco mihrab); 1282–85 (lustre tiles)

Specifications
- Minaret: 1
- Minaret height: 17 m (56 ft)
- Inscriptions: Portal inscription of 641/1243–44; lustre-tile foundation frieze of 684/1285
- Materials: Cut stone; carved stucco; lustre tiles

The Pir Huseyn Khanqah (Azerbaijani: Pir Hüseyn xanəgahı), also known as the Pirsaat or Pirsaatchay Khanqah (Azerbaijani: Pirsaatçay xanəgahı) and the Pir Huseyn Mausoleum, is a fortified Sufi khanqah and shrine complex of the 13th–14th centuries on the left bank of the Pirsaat River near the villages of Qubalıbalaoğlan and Navahı in Hajigabul District, Azerbaijan, about 126 kilometres southwest of Baku. It grew up around the grave of the Qalandari sheikh Pir Huseyn ibn Ali, who lived in the 11th century, and was built and endowed under the Shirvanshah Fariburz III (r. 1225–1255) at the crossroads of the medieval routes between Baku and Salyan.

The complex is best known for its interior decoration in the Ilkhanid tradition of Iran: a monumental carved stucco mihrab dated 1266–67, and an extensive programme of lustre tiles made in Kashan in 1282–85 that covered the walls and cenotaph of the sheikh's tomb chamber. The tiles were stripped from the building between 1907 and 1913 and are now mostly held by the Hermitage Museum in Saint Petersburg, with smaller groups in Tbilisi and Baku; the mihrab was removed in the 1960s and is displayed in the Nizami Museum of Azerbaijani Literature in Baku. It is one of the earliest dated Ilkhanid-period monuments with both carved stucco and lustre-tile revetments, and the most northerly building known to have preserved a monumental carved stucco mihrab.

== History ==
=== The sheikh and the early complex ===
The site's sanctity derives from the grave of Sheikh al-Husayn ibn Ali, known as Pir Huseyn Rawanan, a sheikh of the Qalandariyya who died in the 11th century; Azerbaijani scholars have placed his death in 466/1074–75. His tomb has sometimes been misidentified as that of the Qara Qoyunlu ruler Pir Husayn Abu Sa'id.

The earliest dated inscription at the site is a stone slab of 603/1203–04, later inserted into the minaret, which names the architect Shahzada Habibullah ibn Sheikh Hajji Muhammad. The formation of the complex took place between about 1203 and the mid-13th century. The most plausible sequence is that a burial structure over the sheikh's grave was followed by a second mausoleum for an unidentified person, after which a larger enclosed complex—mosque, vestibule, the sheikh's tomb, service rooms and stables—was laid out around them. The long inscription in the entrance portal, dated 641/1243–44, records that the khanqah was built during the reign of the Shirvanshah Fariburz III by his official Sharaf al-Dawla wa'l-Din Hasan ibn Muhammad ibn Barwandi, who established its waqf. The complex is thus one of the few Sufi monuments of the period that documents its own patronage by state officials acting with the ruler's sanction.

The minaret was a separate, later project. Its inscriptions date it to around 654/1256–57, again mention Fariburz III, and name a second architect, Shams al-Din Muhammad ibn Abi al-Abbas, followed by the signature of Muhammad ibn Ibrahim, probably the head of the stonemasons' workshop.

=== Redecoration under the Ilkhanids ===
Two later interventions gave the interior its Ilkhanid character. In 665/1266–67 a monumental carved stucco mihrab was installed on the qibla wall of the mosque, covering the original modest carved-stone niche. Roughly a decade later, between 681/1282 and 684/1285, the tomb chamber and cenotaph of the sheikh, and probably parts of the mosque, were revetted with lustre tiles. The tile frieze records that the tomb was "rebuilt" by Umar ibn Muhammad al-Shirzadi al-Qazvini in 684/1285; his nisba suggests family or political ties to Qazvin in Iran, which may have helped him secure the commission from the Kashan workshops. A further inscription on the portal dated 800/1397–98 suggests repairs around that time.

=== Rediscovery, dispersal and conservation ===
The ruined site was brought to scholarly attention in 1858 by the Russian numismatist Ivan Bartolomeyev, whose letter prompted Bernhard Dorn to spend two days there in April 1861 and publish its dated inscriptions. In 1907 S. Ter-Avetissian surveyed the building, producing a plan, sketches and photographs that constitute the last record of the decoration in place. The entire ceramic revetment was removed between 1907 and 1913 and passed through dealers in Saint Petersburg, Baku and Paris; pieces from the Stieglitz Museum and the Moscow Asian Museum were eventually consolidated in the Hermitage, and a fragment has been identified in the Victoria and Albert Museum. V. Sysoyev, who published the site in 1925, recorded the dado in place and gave the only measurement of its height. The site was excavated in 1939–40, and in 1946 Vera Kratchkovskaya published a monograph reconstructing the tile programme from the pieces in Leningrad and Tbilisi, without having visited the site herself.

The monument suffered further damage from the Soviet-era dam on the Pirsaat River. A restoration campaign was carried out in 1956–1965, and the stucco mihrab was dismantled and taken to Baku for preservation in the 1960s. The khanqah is registered as an architectural monument of national importance. The complex underwent major conservation and reconstruction in the 2010s; the portal inscription, long kept in Baku, was reinstalled on the rebuilt structure, and life-size photographs of the tiles now in the Hermitage were mounted around the mosque entrance.

== Architecture ==
The complex is built of the cut stone that is plentiful locally and takes a ribat-like form: a fortified enclosure containing several structures of different building phases. Its slightly irregular rectangular plan is oriented north–south around a central courtyard and is enclosed by crenellated ramparts buttressed by round bastions at the corners and semicircular bastions midway along three of the walls. The entrance, on the south-eastern side, is a monumental portal formed by an iwan with a pointed arch. The principal components are the fortified enclosure, the mosque, the sheikh's mausoleum, a seclusion room, a second anonymous mausoleum (a tomb tower on the southern side), service spaces such as stables, and the minaret, which has a square base rising through an octagon to a cylindrical shaft and is entered from the courtyard. The minaret's base measures about 3 × 3 m and it rises about 17 m, with a stone spiral stair inside leading to the muqarnas-supported balcony; loopholes in the ramparts and the corner towers underline the defensive character of the whole.

The mosque, a rectangular hall roofed by a pointed vault reinforced by a central transverse arch, adjoins the sheikh's tomb on its south side; its stone-paved hall doubled as a pilgrimage space. Its door opens asymmetrically onto the east façade, formerly through a small vestibule of the kind found at the Sınıqqala Mosque in Baku, and its plan closely matches that of the Ashur Mosque in Icherisheher; on this basis Cəfər Qiyasi dated the mosque itself to the turn of the 11th–12th centuries, earlier than the surrounding complex. Qiyasi also reads the minaret—built on a cubic plinth level with the neighbouring buildings—as the stage of Shirvan minaret design that followed the Sınıqqala minaret, with finer cut-stone detailing. (Note: Qiyasi reads the minaret inscription as naming a master Mahmud ibn Maqsud and the date 1256, whereas Grbanovic and Leone read the names Shams al-Din Muhammad ibn Abi al-Abbas and Muhammad ibn Ibrahim.)

The exterior decoration is confined to carved stone: inscribed slabs with vegetal backgrounds set into the minaret and portal, and carved elements such as muqarnas. Inside, the passages between rooms are decorated only with simple twisted columns.

== Decoration ==
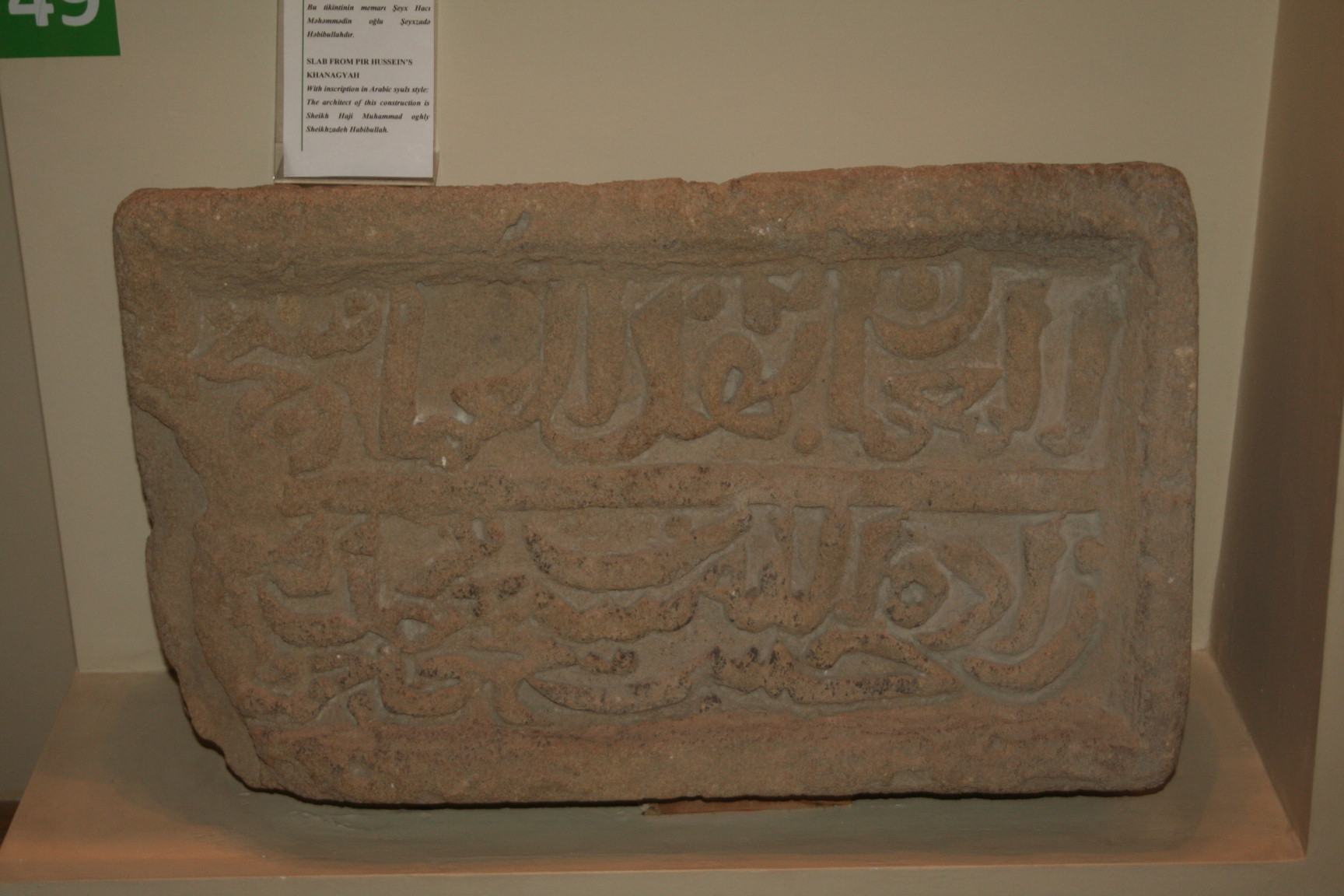
Inscription slab from the khanqah naming its architect. National Museum of History of Azerbaijan, Baku

=== Stucco mihrab ===
The mihrab, now in the Nizami Museum of Azerbaijani Literature, is unusually squat for an Ilkhanid mihrab because its proportions were dictated by the cut-stone qibla wall. It may originally have had a tripartite composition, with smaller niches flanking the central one; part of the left-hand niche survives, but the central niche is lost. The historic inscription above the niche, naming Fariburz III and the date 665/1266–67, is executed not in stucco but as a mosaic of cut glazed elements set into stucco or mortar. Two monumental framing bands surround it: an inner band of perforated geometric scale-work with a central panel of split palmettes and Kufic invocations, and an outer band carrying the Basmala and Quran 9:18 in Kufic against floral scrolls, with knotted star motifs at the corners; the small side niche bears Quran 61:13 in naskh.

The mihrab was produced with a wide range of stucco techniques—single-layer carving, perforation and incision, and applied protruding bosses—but its relief is comparatively shallow and its ornament somewhat disproportionate and provincial, which has been attributed to the local gypsum, to a shortage of skilled hands, or to later restoration. No trace of its original polychromy survives, though it was probably brightly painted like contemporary Iranian stuccos. Grbanovic and Leone conclude that the craftsmen were summoned specifically for the commission, most likely from central or north-western Iran; together with the stuccos of the Alinja khanqah in Nakhchivan, it is the most northerly surviving Ilkhanid stucco work.

=== Lustre tiles ===
The lustre tiles are attributed to the workshops of Kashan, more than 700 km away, making the khanqah one of the most distant known destinations of Ilkhanid lustre tiles; the shaped tiles of the cenotaph and the foundation frieze show that they were commissioned for the building rather than bought ready-made. Kratchkovskaya identified 123 lustre stars dated 1282–85 and 325 turquoise-glazed crosses in the Hermitage as coming from the site. Three zones of decoration in the small tomb chamber have been reconstructed from Ter-Avetissian's 1907 photograph and on-site measurements:

- Dado. Panels of interlocking turquoise crosses and eight-pointed lustre stars about 20 cm across, rising to a height of about 1.6 m and covering roughly 16.6 m², which would have required around 400 tiles of each type. Each star is bordered by a naskh inscription on a white ground around a lustre-painted centre with geometric, vegetal or animal (mainly bird) motifs; the borders quote twenty Quranic suras, with about 8 per cent of the text consisting of Persian poetic quatrains.
- Epigraphic frieze. A band of 30 nearly square tiles (about 35 cm) with a thuluth inscription in cobalt relief, running about 10.5 m around the top of the walls above the dado. Unusually for lustre friezes, the text is a foundation inscription: it names the sheikh with his titles and records the rebuilding of the tomb by Umar ibn Muhammad al-Shirzadi al-Qazvini in 684/1285. Kratchkovskaya located 26 of the 30 tiles in the Hermitage, Tbilisi and Baku; five are displayed in the Nizami Museum.
- Cenotaph. The three-stage stone cenotaph (a base of about 2.15 × 1.45 m, a central block and a trapezoidal cover) survives and appears to retain the shape and size of the tiled original. Its cover was clad with specially made rectangular tiles with one edge inclined at 25 degrees, inscribed with verses from Sura Ya-Sin, a form with no known parallel; a frieze from Sura 76 (Al-Insan) and corner tiles are attributed to its body and base.

The decoration has been compared with the Ilkhanid shrines of Abd al-Samad at Natanz, Fatima at Qom, and Imam Reza at Mashhad, but at Pir Huseyn the confined room made the dado the focus of the scheme rather than a setting for a lustre mihrab, and the frieze's position at the top of the walls—where stucco friezes normally run—makes it a hybrid of tile and stucco conventions and a rare foundation text in lustre.

== See also ==
- Shirvanshahs' Palace
- Pir Hasan Mausoleum
- Architecture of Azerbaijan

== Sources ==
- Aslanapa, Oktay (1979). Kırım ve Azerbaycan'da Türk Eserleri (in Turkish). Istanbul: Baha Matbaası. pp. 84–92.
- Grbanovic, Ana Marija; Leone, Anaïs (2026). "A Re-Examination of the Stucco Mihrab and Lustre Tiles from the Pir-i Husayn Khanqah (13–14th Centuries, Hacıqabul, Qubalıbalaoğlan, Azerbaijan)". Journal of Material Cultures in the Muslim World. 6: 90–123. doi:10.1163/26666286-12340073.
- Kratchkovskaya, V. A. (1946). Izraztsy mavzoleya Pir-Khuseina (Les Faïences du mausolée de Pir-Houssein) (in Russian). Tbilisi: Academy of Sciences of the Georgian SSR.
- Kratchkovskaja, V. (1954). "Texte de construction: Khanakah Pir Husain". Répertoire chronologique d'épigraphie arabe (in French). Vol. XII. pp. 54–56.
- Mammadova, Gulchohra; Mammadova, Zahida (2013). History of Azerbaijan Architecture: Medieval Architecture (VIII–XIV century). Vol. 2. Baku: Sharq-Qarb. p. 112.
- Qiyasi, Cəfər (1991). Nizami dövrünün memarlıq abidələri (in Azerbaijani). Baku: İşıq. pp. 50–51.
- Raygorodsky, S. P.; Kanukov, E. I. (1947). "Khanega na reke Pirsaat". Arkhitektura Azerbaidzhana: epokha Nizami (in Russian). Moscow–Baku. p. 204.
- Sysoyev, V. I. (1925). Drevnosti v khanege bliz sela Navagi. Izvestiya Azerbaidzhanskogo arkheologicheskogo komiteta (in Russian). Vol. 4. Baku.
- "Pirsaat xanəgahı". Azerbaijani Soviet Encyclopedia (in Azerbaijani). Vol. 7. Baku. 1983. p. 539.
- Wilber, Donald Newton (1955). The Architecture of Islamic Iran: The Il Khanid Period. Princeton: Princeton University Press. pp. 106–107.
- Watson, Oliver (1985). Persian Lustre Ware. London: Faber and Faber. pp. 186–187.
