= Qubalıbalaoğlan =

- Municipality
- Location within Azerbaijan
- Coordinates: 40°07′48″N 49°03′47″E
- Country: Azerbaijan
- Rayon: Hajigabul
- Elevation: 49 m (161 ft)

Population (2013)
  - Total: 2,865
- Time zone: UTC+4 (AZT)
  - Summer (DST): UTC+5 (AZT)

Qubalıbalaoğlan (also, Qubalıbaloğlan, Kubah, Kubali-Bala-Oglan, Kubaly, and Kubalybalaoglan) is a village and municipality in the Hajigabul Rayon of Azerbaijan. It has a population of 2,631. The municipality consists of the villages of Qubalıbalaoğlan and Pirsaatçay.
