= Talışnuru =

- Municipality
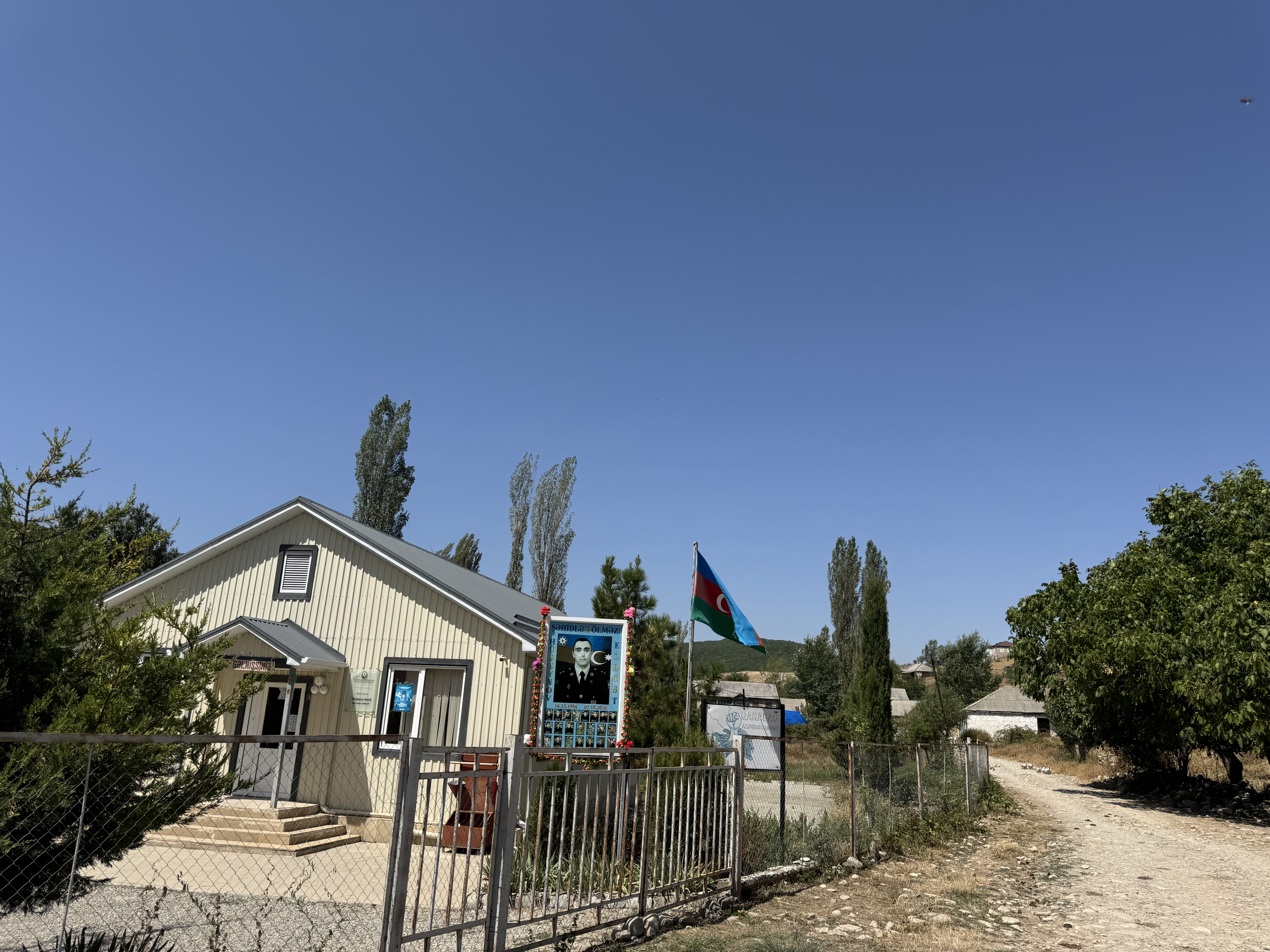

- Location within Azerbaijan
- Coordinates: 40°46′N 48°40′E
- Country: Azerbaijan
- Rayon: Shamakhi

Population
  - Total: 315
- Time zone: UTC+4 (AZT)
  - Summer (DST): UTC+5 (AZT)

Talışnuru (also, Talysh”-Nuri and Talyshnuru) is a village and municipality in the Shamakhi Rayon of Azerbaijan. It has a population of 315.
