= Nağaraxana =

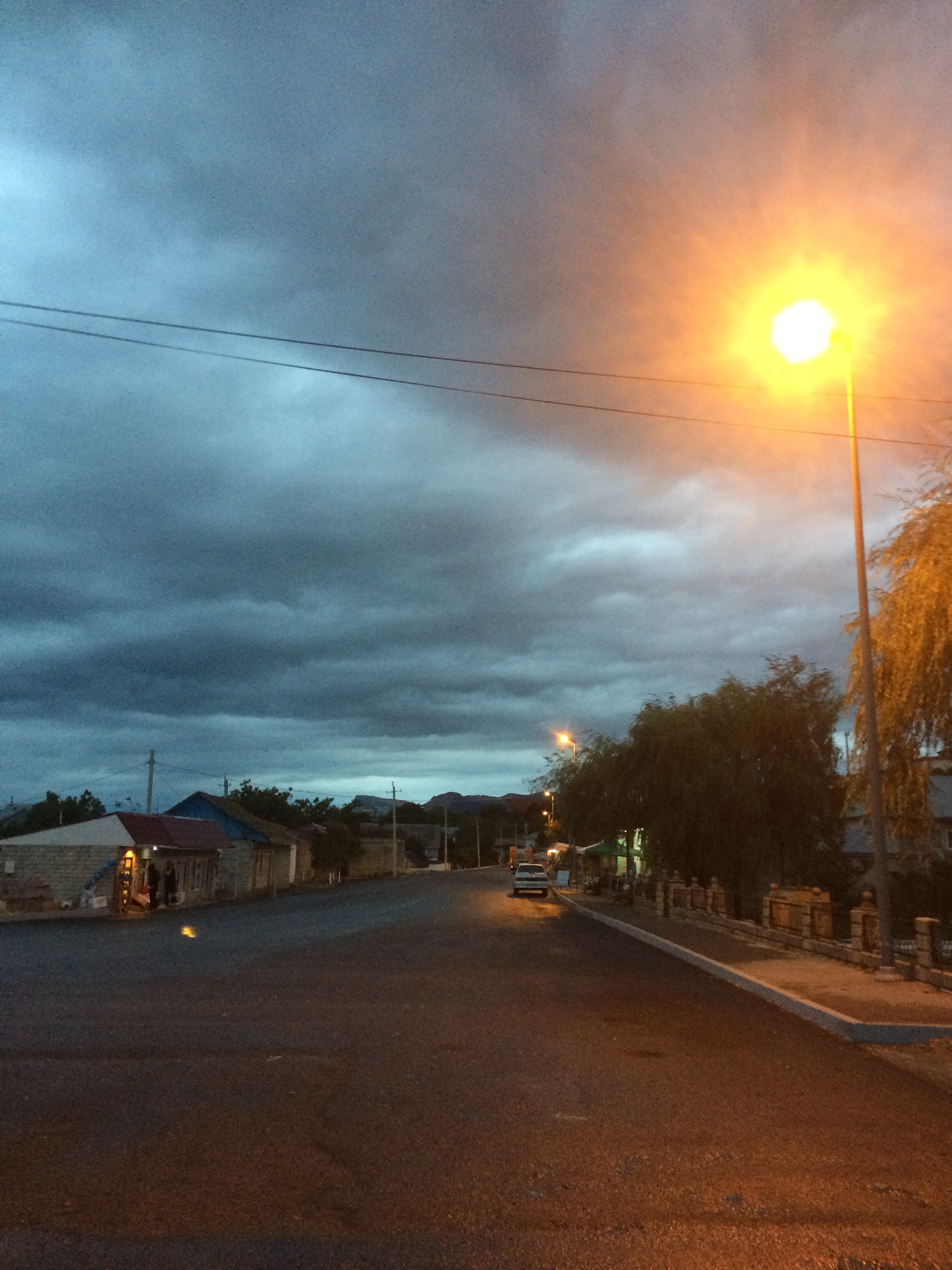

- Location within Azerbaijan
- Coordinates: 40°44′27″N 48°38′41″E
- Country: Azerbaijan
- Rayon: Shamakhi

Population
  - Total: 759
- Time zone: UTC+4 (AZT)
  - Summer (DST): UTC+5 (AZT)

Nağaraxana (formerly Kirovka) is a village and municipality in the Shamakhi Rayon of Azerbaijan. It has a population of 759.
