= Garshasp I of Shirvan =

Garshasp I
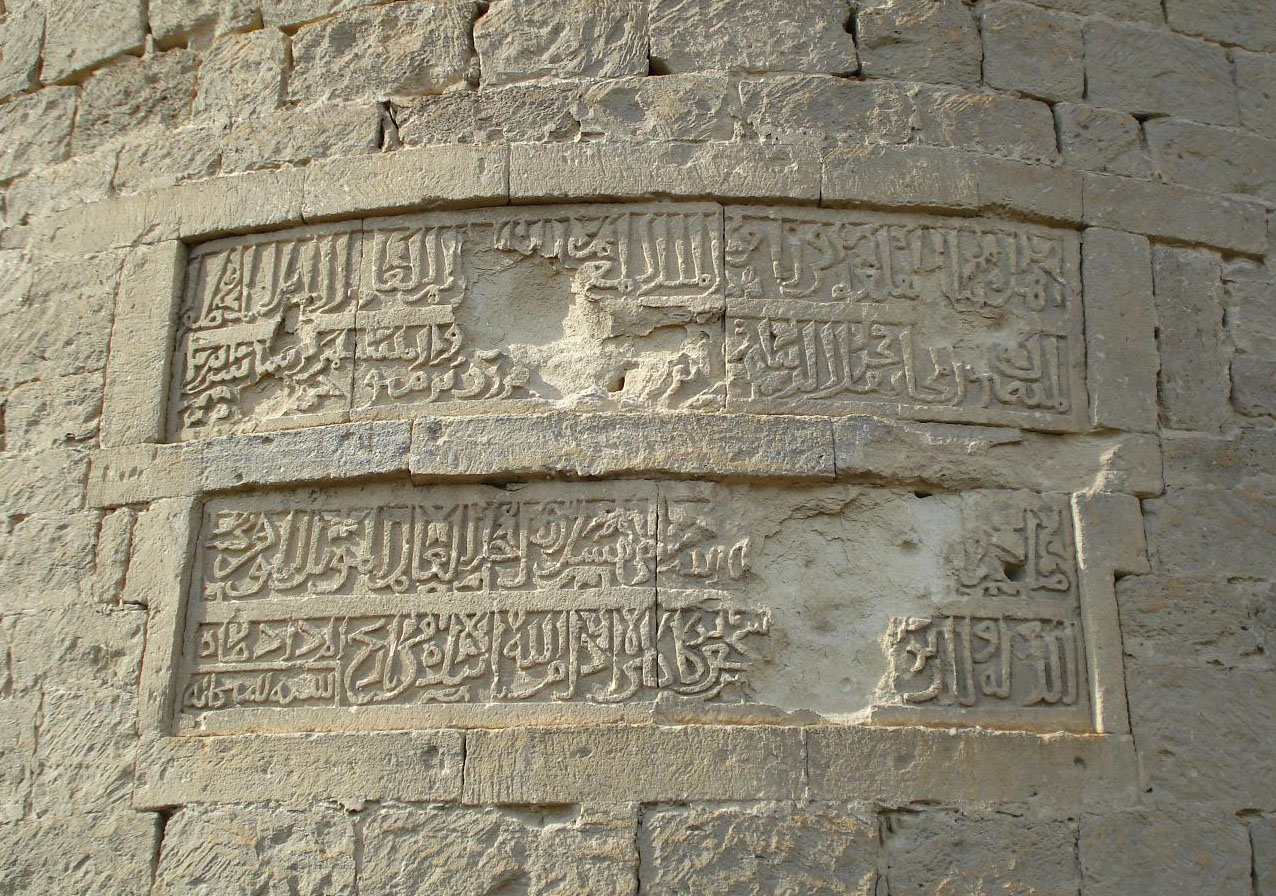
- An inscription in the Round Tower of Mardakan, which mentions Garshasp I

Shirvanshah
- Reign: after 1203–1233/34
- Predecessor: Farrukhzad I
- Successor: Fariburz III
- Died: 1233/34
- Issue: Fariburz III; Jalal al-Din Sultanshah
- Dynasty: Kasranids
- Father: Farrukhzad I

Garshasp I (Persian: گرشاسپ, romanized: Garšāsp) was the Shirvanshah from post-1203 to 1233/34. He was the son and successor of Farrukhzad I (r. 1203 – before 1225), whom he may have initially co-ruled with.

== Background ==
Garshasp was a son of Farrukhzad I (r. 1187–1203 – before 1225). His name is the New Persian form of the Avestan name Kərəsāspa, which likely means "he with meager horses".

== Reign ==
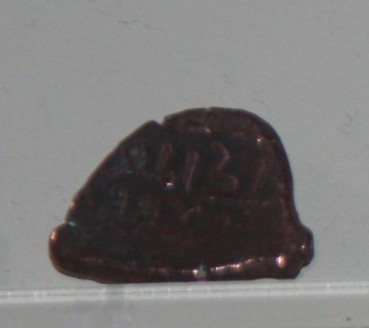
Copper coin minted under Garshasp I. Located in the Museum of History of Azerbaijan, Baku

He ruled during a time in Shirvanshah history that scholarship has referred to "a period of total confusion", due to the lack of written records and contradictory numismatic evidence. Garshasp's reign started sometime after 1203, while recent evidence suggests that Farrukhzad I did not rule beyond 1225. An inscription from a tower in Mardakan mentions both Farrukhzad I and Garshasp, crediting the latter with the construction of the tower. The Armenian-American historian Dickran Kouymjian suggests that they may have ruled in different parts of the kingdom, with Farrukhzad I most likely ruling in Baku, which is close to Mardakan.

In 1225, the Khwarazmshah Jalal al-Din Mangburni (r. 1220–1231) demanded that Garshasp pay him a tribute identical to the one the Shirvanshah Fariburz I (r. 1063–1096) had paid the Seljuk ruler Malik-Shah I (r. 1072–1092) over a century ago.

Based on numismatic evidence, it was initially suggested that Garshasp did not rule after 1225. However, new evidence suggests that Garshasp's reign was longer. The numismatist Blau discovered a unique coin with the name of Garshasp, and which mentions the Abbasid caliph al-Mustansir I, who ruled from 1226 to 1242. Moreover, a newly found inscription from another tower in Mardakan suggests that Garshasp was still living by 1233/34, and perhaps also still ruling. This new evidence suggests that Garshasp ruled jointly with his son Fariburz III. Fariburz may have ruled an area outside the capital until his father's death. Another theory is that Fariburz was given control over the central government by Garshasp, who withdrew to Baku region.

== Family ==
He was succeeded by his son Fariburz III who may have deposed him. According to The Georgian Chronicles, around 1223 an unnamed Shirvanshah asked for the hand of the Georgian princess Rusudan, the sister of the king of Georgia, George IV (r. 1213–1223). The proposal was accepted, but was soon cancelled due to George IV's death, which occurred while he was en route to the ceremony. The unnamed Shirvanshah may have been Garshasp, Fariburz III or Farrukhzad I. According to another source, a younger son of Garshasp - who was sent to Georgian court to be baptized and raised as a consort to Gurju Khatun in 1222 - Jalal al-Din Sultanshah was captured by Khwarazmshah Jalal al-Din Mangburni in 1226, circumcised was given Gustasfi as a fief.

== Sources ==
- Bosworth, C. E. (2011). "Šervānšāhs". Encyclopaedia Iranica.
- Kouymjian, Dickran (1969). A Numismatic History of Southeastern Caucasia and Adharbayjan based on the Islamic Coinage of the 5th/11th to the 7th/13th Centuries. Columbia University.
- Skjærvø, Prods Oktor (2011). "Karsāsp". In Yarshater, Ehsan (ed.). Encyclopædia Iranica. Vol. XV/6: Karim Khan Zand–Kašḡari, Saʿd-al-Din. London and New York: Routledge & Kegan Paul. pp. 601–607. ISBN 978-1-934283-29-5.

Garshasp I of Shirvan Kasranids
Regnal titles
Preceded by Farrukhzad I	Shirvanshah post-1203–1233/34	Succeeded by Fariburz III
