= House of Derbent =

- Parent family: Kasranids
- Founded: 1382
- Founder: Yazid ibn Ahmad
- Final ruler: Abu Bakr Mirza
- Titles: Shirvanshah
- Connected families: Yazidids; Sharvashidze; Kasranids
- Dissolution: 1602

House of Derbent or Darbandids was a younger branch of Shirvanshahs that succeeded Kasranids.

== Name ==
Their derives from town of Derbent. Emirate of Derbent was ruled by local clan of Hashimids from 869 and was invaded numerous times by Shirvanshahs who saw the fief as their own. Sometimes, sons or brothers of shahs were granted Derbent as a fief. Derbent was fully incorporated to Shirvan by 13th century. Prince Sultan Muhammad of Shirvan was a wali of Derbent whose son Ibrahim I of Shirvan was a first shah of branch.

== Dynasty ==
Family tree of Derbendis, including reigning shahs (with gold crown) and pretenders (in silver crown) and Tamerlane's dynasty.

- Sultan Muhammad
  - Ibrahim I (1382–1417)
    - Khalilullah I (1418–1465) (m. Khanikah - daughter of Abu Bakr ibn Miran Shah (1382–1409))
      - Farrukh Yamin (b.1436–d.1443)
      - Farrukh Yasar (1465–1500) (m. sister of Adil, Utsmi of Kaitags)
        - Bahram Beg (d. 1501)
        - Muhammad Ghazi Beg (d. 1501)
          - Sultan Mahmud (d. 1505)
          - Mirza Muhammad Bey (fl. 1541)
        - Ibrahim II Shaykhshah (d. 1524)
          - Khalilullah II (1524–1535) (m. Pari Khan Khanum, daughter of Ismail I)
          - Farrukh Yasar II (c. 1527)
            - Shahrukh (1535–1538)
          - Muhammad (d. 1528)
          - Muzaffar
          - Farrukh Yassar
        - Gawhar-Sultan Khanum m. Ya'qub Beg
      - Shaykh Saleh (b.1443–d.1445)
      - Amir Bahram (d. 1446)
      - Muhammad Ibrahim (d. 1432)
    - Kayumars (d.c. 1412
    - Ghazanfar (1398 – 1443)
    - Kayqubad (d. 1425)
    - Ishaq (d. 1425)
      - Abu-Bakr
        - Kayqubad
          - Burhan Ali (r. 1548–1550, d. 1549)
            - Khalaf Mirza
            - Abu Bakr Mirza (d. 1602) (m. daughter of Devlet I Giray)
              - Burhan Ali
          - A daughter
            - Kavus Mirza
    - Asadullah (fl. 1412)
    - Manuchihr (fl. 1412)
    - Abdurrahman (fl. 1412)
    - Nasratullah (fl. 1412)
    - Hashim (d. 1425)
    - Farrukhzad (fl. 1412)
    - Lal Bi Tukmak (m. Umar Shaikh Mirza I in c. 1387)
  - Bahlul, general (fl. 1412)
    - Tahmuras, general (d. 1459)

Moreover, there were at least three pretenders - Mehrab, Qorban Ali Mirza, Qasem Mirza who claimed to have descended from Shirvanshah dynasty. However their exact relationship is unknown. Although Tārīkh-i Quṭb-i Shāhīyah claims a certain prince called Hamza was a son of Farrukh Yassar who took part in a campaign during reign of Ahmad Jalayir, this is chronologically impossible.

== Sources ==
- Ashurbeyli, Sara (1983). Государство Ширваншахов (VI-XVI вв.) [The State of the Shirvanshahs (6th–16th centuries)] (in Russian). Baku: Elm.
- Minorsky, Vladimir (1958). A History of Sharvān and Darband in the 10th-11th Centuries. Cambridge: W. Heffer and Sons. OCLC 5042566.
