= Kavus I =

Kavus
- Shah of Shirvan
- Reign: 1348 - 1372
- Predecessor: Kayqubad
- Successor: Hushang
- Died: 1372
- Issue: Nodar; Hushang
- House: Kasranid
- Father: Kayqubad
- Religion: Sunni Islam

Kavus (Persian: کاووس) or Kawus or sometimes Keykavus II was the 32nd ruler of Shirvan. He was a son of Kayqubad and older brother of Sultan Muhammad.

== Co-reign ==
According to Abd al-Razzaq Samarqandi, he was styled as "Lord of Shamakhi and Shirvan" in youth. Abdulkarim Alizadeh argued that probably he was already ruling in name of his father in 1348, due to Kayqubad's advanced age.

He sought to gain strong alliance with Chupanid Malek Ashraf, as he travelled to his court and submitted to him. However, Malek Ashraf then unexpectedly killed a nobleman named amir Haji Shahriman and his son in Karabakh. Kavus was horrified and immediately returned to Shirvan. Soon, Malek Ashraf sent his envoys Khwaja Abdulhay and Akhijuq Malik to Shirvan and to express his desire to marry a daughter of Kayqubad. Kavus denied the demand, and frustrated because of denial, Malek marched on Shirvan but was repelled and forced to make peace. He attacked Shirvan once again in the winter of 1347, but Kavus and his father took shelter in the well guarded castles of Shirvan. After this invasion, sources do not mention Kayqubad, and he probably died of old age between 1348 and 1356.

== Sole reign ==
After death of his father he forged an alliance with Golden Horde khan Jani Beg and invited him to Azerbaijan. Aided by Shirvanshahs, the Golden Horde army captured Tabriz. Malek Ashraf was executed by Jani Beg. However, Jani Beg died soon and Golden Horde army left Caucasus, leaving a power vacuum behind. A successor of Malek, Akhi Juq started to oppress former Chopanid officials, who in turn fled to Shirvan. Kavus sent his troops under his son Nodar to fight. First battle took place in Mughan in 1357. Following the battle, Kavus himself led his army to Karabakh and invaded Akhi's domains. Second battle took place on the shores of Aras river, after which sides made peace.

=== Relations with Jalayirids ===
His relationship with Shaykh Uways was complicated, as he had submitted to him at first, but rebelled later. Jalayir campaigned against him 1363 but a revolt begun by the governor of Baghdad, Khwaja Mirjan, forced him to return to reassert his authority. Kavus, using the opportunity captured Tabriz twice. Uways, in response, sent his favourite emir Bayram Beg, who besieged Shamakhi for 3 months after which Kavus was jailed for another 3 months. He was pardoned and accepted to become Jalayirid vassal with his son Hushang being Uways' hostage until 1372.

=== Death and legacy ===
He was a patron of the arts and science. Arif Ardabili, a poet from Ardabil, lived in his palace and was a tutor for next Shirvanshah Hushang. Kavus died in 1372 of natural causes.

== Sources ==
- al-Ahrǐ, Abū Bakr al-Qutbī (1954). Ta'rikh-i Shaikh Uwais (History of Shaikh Uwais); an important source for the history of Adharbaijan in the fourteenth century. 'S-Gravenhage: Mouton & Co. OCLC 83888707.
- Wing, Patrick (2016). The Jalayirids: Dynastic State Formation in the Mongol Middle East. Edinburgh University Press. pp. 1–256. ISBN 9781474402262.

Kavus I House of Shirvanshah Born: ? Died: 1372
Regnal titles
Preceded by Shirvanshah Keykubad I	Shirvanshah; 1348 - 1372	Succeeded by Shirvanshah Hushang
