= Muhammad Mosque =

Former mosque in Baku, Azerbaijan

Muhammad Mosque Siniggala Mosque
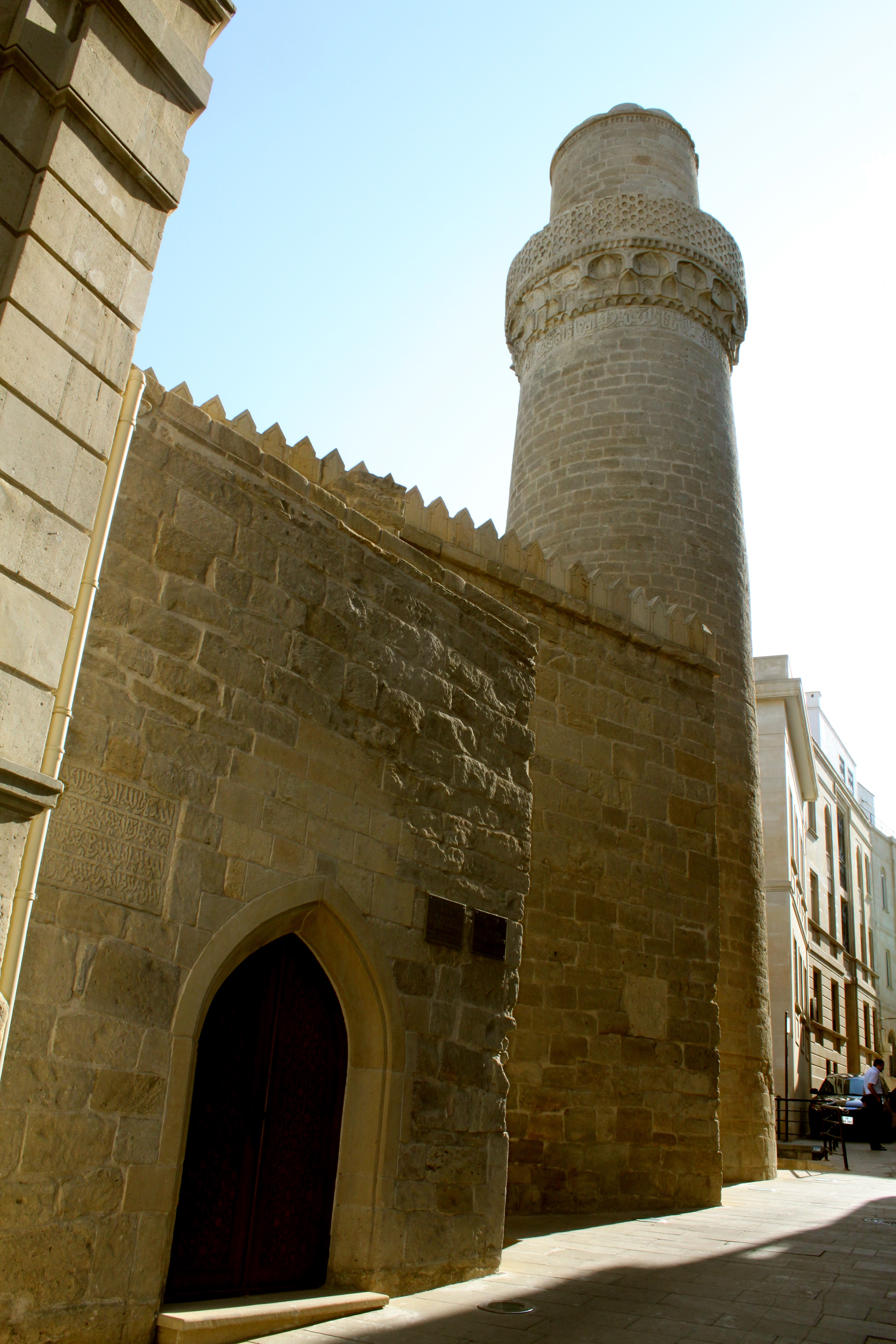
- The minaret of the former mosque in 2013

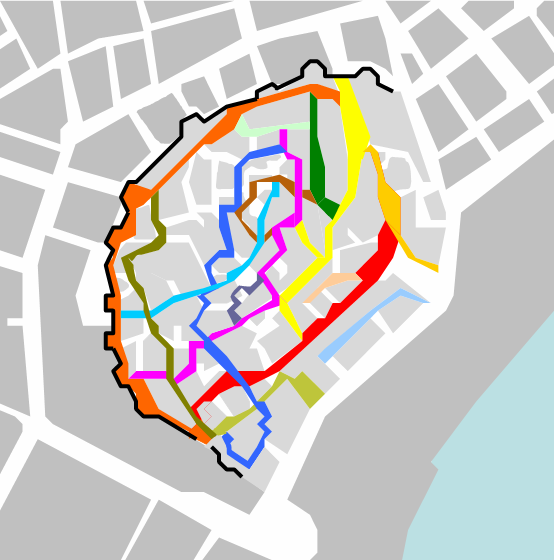
- Location of the former mosque in the Baku Old City

Religion
- Affiliation: Islam (former)
- Ecclesiastical or organizational status: Mosque (former)

Location
- Location: Old City, Baku
- Country: Azerbaijan
- Interactive map of Muhammad Mosque; Siniggala Mosque
- Coordinates: 40°21′55″N 49°50′05″E

Architecture
- Type: Mosque architecture
- Style: Islamic
- Completed: 471 AH (1078/1079 CE)

Specifications
- Minaret: One
- Inscriptions: One
- Materials: Stone

The Muhammad Mosque or Siniggala Mosque (Note: The name Siniggala, meaning "damaged tower", is attributed to the mosque's minaret.) is a former mosque, located in the Old City of Baku, Azerbaijan. The mosque was built in the 11th century.

It is the first building in Azerbaijan, which is related to Islam and dated for its architectural ligature.

== Architecture ==
According to Arabic inscription which was saved in front of the doorway of the northern wall of the mosque, it was built by ustad-rais Muhammad the son of Abu Bakr in 471 of Hijra (1078/79). It means that the architect was not only a master-ustad, but also a rais-head of artificers’ corporation.

=== Minaret ===
In 1723, the mosque acquired the name Siniggala, when a military squadron of the Russian Army, consisting of 15 warships and led by Admiral Matyushkin, approached the city from seaside and demanded its surrender during the Russo-Persian War. Russian warships began to bomb the city after the refusal to surrender. One of the Russian shells hit the minaret of Muhammad Mosque and damaged it. A stormy wind then blew the Russian ships further out to sea. The population of the city interpreted the wind as a divine scourge sent to the occupants. From that time until the middle of the 19th century, the minaret of the mosque wasn't reconstructed. It remained a symbol of the persistence and courage of the defendants of the tower.

The minaret adjoins the new mosque, which was constructed based on the older one's plan. The trunk of the minaret is strong and slightly thinning. It is constructed from carefully drafted stone. Coarse and flat stalactites of tabling retain sherefe – muezzin’s balcony enclosed by stone plates. A ribbed dome completes the trunk of the minaret. Narrow, winding stairs are winded within the trunk. Ligature with Koranic inscription was traced under the tabling with archaic kufi alphabet.

== See also ==
- Islam in Azerbaijan
- List of mosques in Azerbaijan
- List of mosques in Baku
