= National Museum of History of Azerbaijan =

Museum in Baku, Azerbaijan

Coordinates: 40°22′10″N 49°50′24″E

- National Museum of History of Azerbaijan
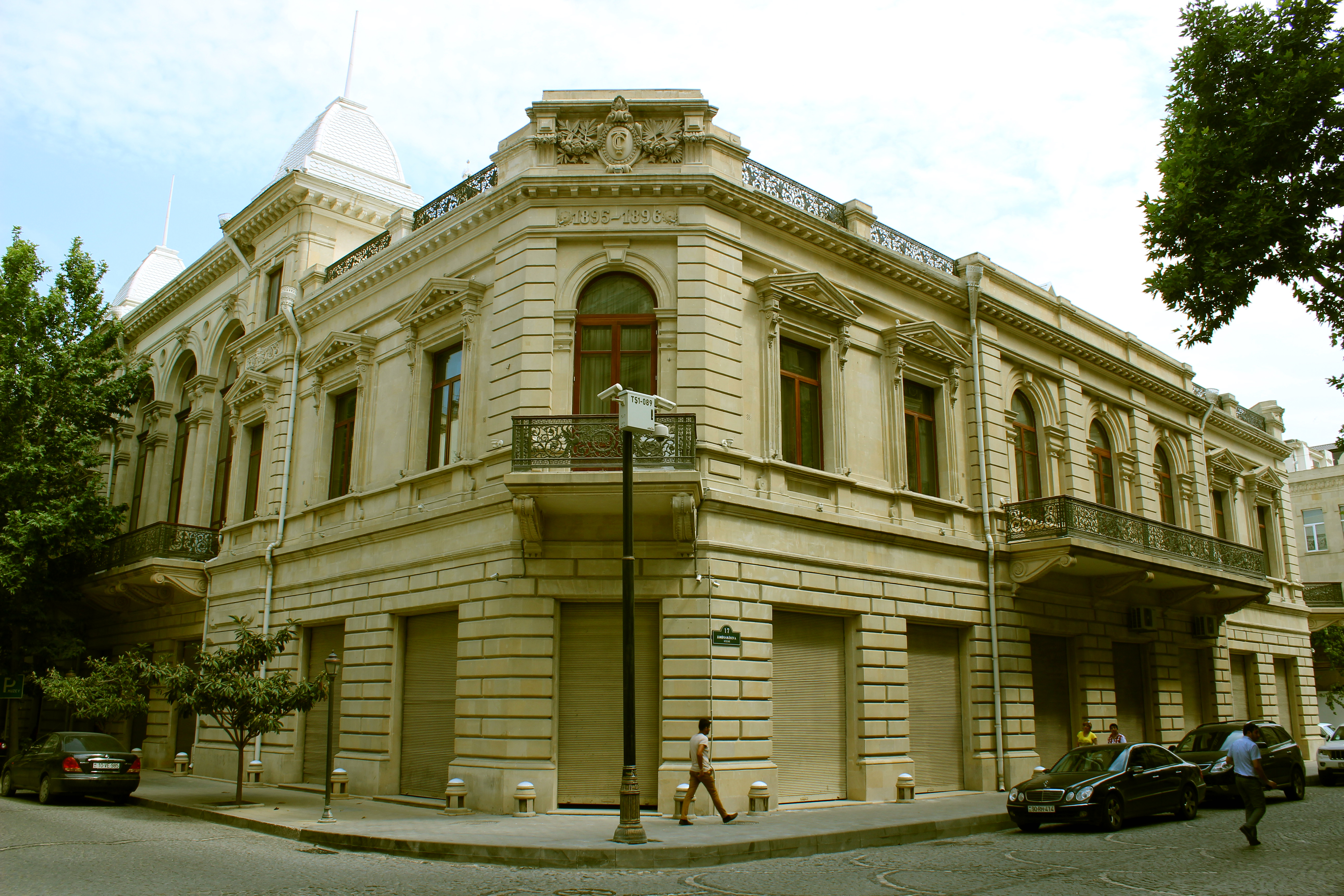
- National Museum of History of Azerbaijan
- Established: 1920
- Location: H. Z. Taghiyev Street 4, Baku, Azerbaijan
- Type: National Museum of History of Azerbaijan
- Director: Naila Valikhanli
- Public transit access: M 1 Sahil metro station
- Website: www.azhistorymuseum.gov.az

The National Museum of History of Azerbaijan (Azerbaijani: Milli Azərbaycan Tarixi Muzeyi) is the largest museum in Azerbaijan. It is located in Baku, in the former residential house of Azerbaijani oil magnate and philanthropist Haji Zeynalabdin Taghiyev. The museum was founded in 1920, following the Russian takeover of Baku, and opened to visitors in 1921. The building itself was built by Polish architect Józef Gosławski.

== History ==
The museum's building was constructed between 1895 and 1901, originally as a residence for the Taghiyev family. It was designed by Polish architect Józef Gosławski, in imitation of the Italian Renaissance style. It is large, stretching over an entire block and reaching four floors in some parts. Since 1914, Baku Commercial Bank, which was headed by Taghiyev, had been situated in the mansion.

When the Red Army entered Baku in April 1920, Taghiyev's residence was immediately confiscated. Under a resolution of the USSR People's Commissariat, the residence was established as the State Historical Museum in June 1920, just two months after the Bolsheviks took Baku.

In May 1934, a special order was adopted to improve the teaching of history and geography in schools. In effect, it sought to promote the advantages of socialism and nurture the totalitarian regime's ideology in the rising generation. A Marxist interpretation of history was delivered via the establishment of historical research and other institutions. In addition, new kinds of historical and regional museums were created to inspire the teaching and promotion of history.

Under this new system, the network of museums with historical profiles was enlarged. Furthermore, mechanisms of Soviet advocacy became much stronger during this period.

Knowledge of Azerbaijan's history was developed through the museum's research. Between 1925 and the 1960s, foundations were laid for the scientific investigation of ancient material and cultural monuments of Azerbaijan, under the direction of archaeologists such as Davud Sharifov, Yevgeniy Pakhomov, Ishak Jafar-Zadeh, Movsum Salamov, Saleh Gaziyev, and Mammadali Huseynov. Excavations were carried out in places such as Khojaly, Qabala, Ganja, Kharaba Gilan, Orangala, and Mingechevir. The museum's collections consist of materials discovered during these excavations and from other ethnographic expeditions.

During 1941–1954, the Museum of History was moved to the Palace of the Shirvanshahs, and the Council of People's Commissars of Azerbaijan SSR was in the mansion. In 1954, the museum began operating again on the second floor of the mansion. In 2000, the whole mansion was given to the authority of the Museum of History of Azerbaijan.

== The building ==
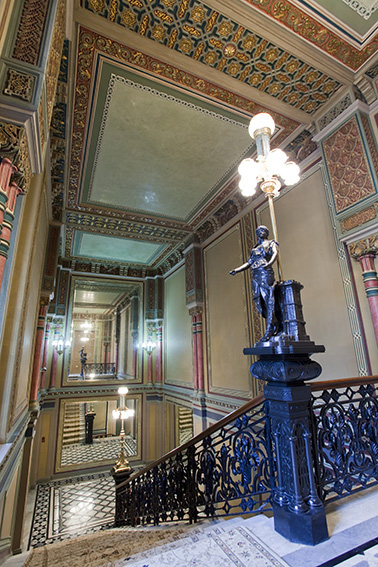
Main staircase leading to the Oriental Hall

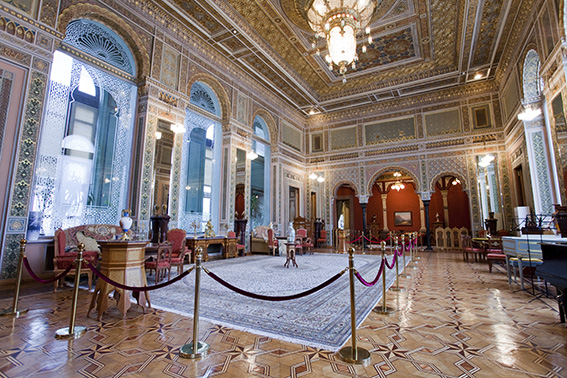
Oriental Hall

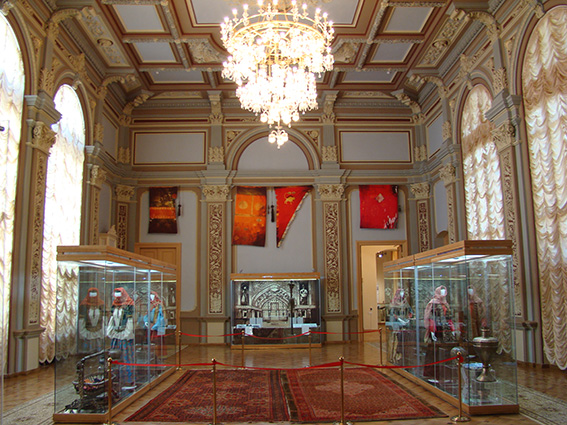
European Hall

The museum's building was originally the residence of the well-known entrepreneur and philanthropist Haji Zeynalabdin Taghiyev and his family. It was designed by Iosif Goslavsky (1865–1904), the chief architect of the city of Baku during the time (1893–1904). There are twelve remaining architectural buildings in Baku built based on Goslavsky's designs.

Some 270 engineers, architects, carpenters, painters, and other masters worked on the mansion's construction between 1895 and 1901. Construction alone cost 1.2 million roubles, excluding furniture and equipment, all of which was brought from Russia, France, America, and Germany. Heating and cooling systems were also installed.

The mansion rises three stories on all four sides, and the height of each room reaches 13.20 meters. Its facade overlooked Gorchakov Street (now H. Z. Tagiyev Street), while its other sides overlooked Baryatinsky Street (now A. Alizade Street), Polis Street (now Y. Mammadaliyev Street), and Mercury Street (now Z. Aliyeva Street).

The interior layout of the mansion is based on a two-row construction of rooms. The reception room and the living room are divided into groups around two enclosed courtyards. The front part of the building faces west and has two separate marble staircases. Taghiyev's office was located on the ground floor. Living quarters, a study, two great ballrooms, a kitchen, a bathroom, and other rooms were all located on the second floor. The third floor has 16 additional rooms.

There are two large ballrooms on the second floor: one in an Oriental (Mauritanian) style and the other in a Western (European) style. The Oriental Hall features enormous plate glass windows, gilded arches, highly decorated walls, floral pilasters, ceilings, and chandeliers. It also had an attached winter garden with a small fountain in its center. The lines in the Occidental Room are more rectangular in comparison.

According to photographic evidence, one of the most elaborate rooms in the original building was the boudoir (private sitting room) for Sona Khanum, Taghiyev's wife. All the movable furniture and paintings in this room have since disappeared; nothing remains except the ornate mirrored mosaic ceiling.

During the Soviet period in the mid-20th century, four layers of white paint were applied over the highly decorative floral designs on the walls of the mirrored room, which were seen as "bourgeois remains". These were uncovered during renovations in 2000. Elsewhere in the residence, the original paint has survived. The paint was made of finely ground eggshell, a practice used by artisans for Byzantine icons. Nearly 100 years later, the original colors with their subtlety and sophistication have neither faded nor chipped.

Fundamental renovation, restoration, and reconstruction works commenced in the Taghiyev mansion in 2005. The Memorial Museum of H.Z. Taghiyev (under the National Museum of History of Azerbaijan) was also established on the initiative of President Ilham Aliyev.

== Memorial Museum of Haji Zeynalabdin Taghiyev ==
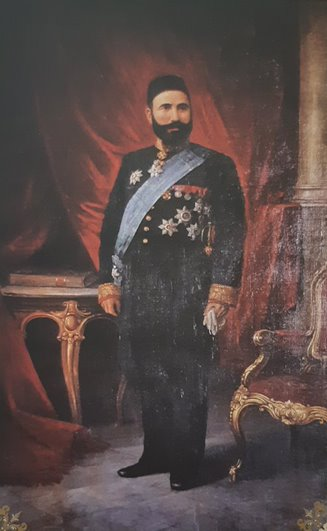
Portrait of Haji Zeynalabdin Taghiyev by Isaak Brodsky, c. 1912

Restoration of rooms, personal belongings, and furniture of the Memorial Museum of Haji Zeynalabdin Taghiyev has been organized by specialists from Azerbaijan and Italy. The interior restorations are based on photographs from the family photo album. The museum includes the following restored rooms:

1. Taghiyev's study – furnished with Taghiyev's writing desk, armchair, books on Russian law, and a private collection of paintings. Included is a portrait of Taghiyev himself, painted by Isaak Brodsky in 1912, which was commissioned by the city council for his financial contributions to aid the construction of a local technical college.
2. Oriental Hall – one of the mansion's largest and most ornate rooms, designed in an Oriental (Mauritanian) style. It was used for official meetings, receptions, and ceremonies. Nine kilograms of gold were used for inscription and decoration.
3. Taghiyev's library – the contents of the room highlight Taghiyev's great efforts to promote learning and philanthropy. For example, he financed the publishing of works by prominent writers, poets, and historians. He also owned the newspaper Kaspi and was the first to publish the Quran in Azerbaijani.
4. Billiard room
5. Dining room – displays velvet-covered chairs, a silver enameled dinner set, silver knives from France, cut glass goblets, and other luxuries.
6. Monitored room – an interactive display for museum visitors.
7. Boudoir – a small sitting room of Taghiyev's second wife, Sona Khanim. Also called the "Mirror Hall" due to the plate glass covering the ceiling and colorful ornaments decorating the walls.
8. Bedroom
9. Dressing room

== Museum funds ==
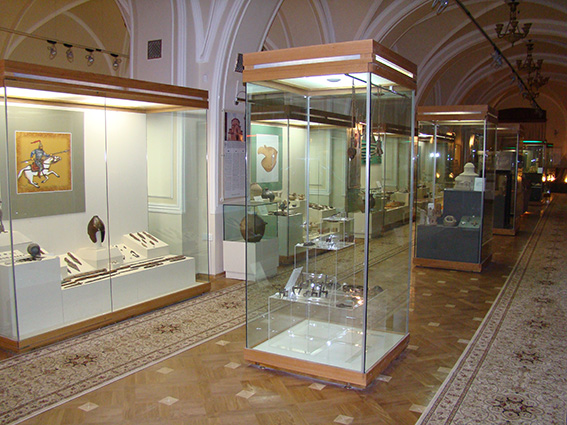
Artifacts of the Archaeological Fund

Throughout its history, the National Museum has established dedicated funds to carry out expeditions, enable preservation efforts, promote cultural study and education, and develop the museum's collection. As of 2024, the museum hosts 12 unique funds.

The oldest funds, established in the 1920s, include the Archaeological Fund (1920), which facilitates study of the historical, archaeological, and cultural heritage of Azerbaijan; the Numismatics Fund (1920), which preserves, studies, and promotes a collection of 100,000 ancient and oriental coins, as well as non-coin material (stamps, orders, medals, etc.); and the Ethnographic Fund (1925), which seeks to represent cultural artifacts and crafts of Azerbaijani ethnic groups, including copperworking, faience, wood products, fabrics, and carpets.

Additional newer funds include the Special Fund (precious metals and jewelry) (1955), Fund of Documentary Sources (1996), Fund of Gifts and Memorabilia (2009), and Patriotic War Fund (2021), among others.

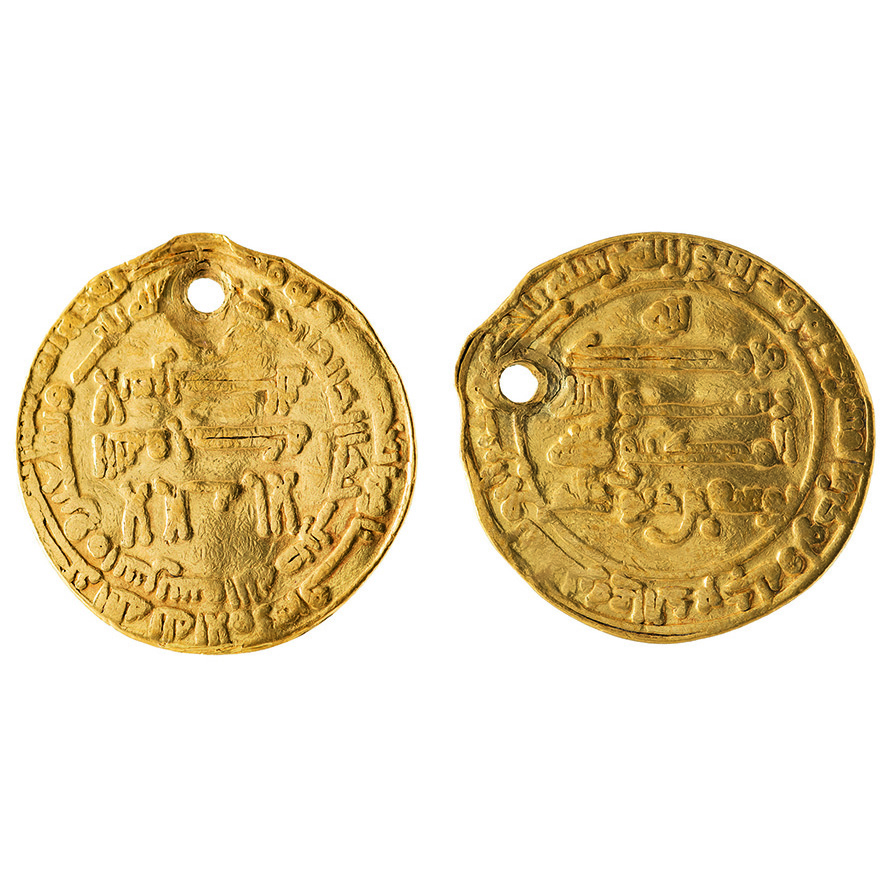
Golden dinar of the Sajid state of Azerbaijan (Fund of Numismatics)

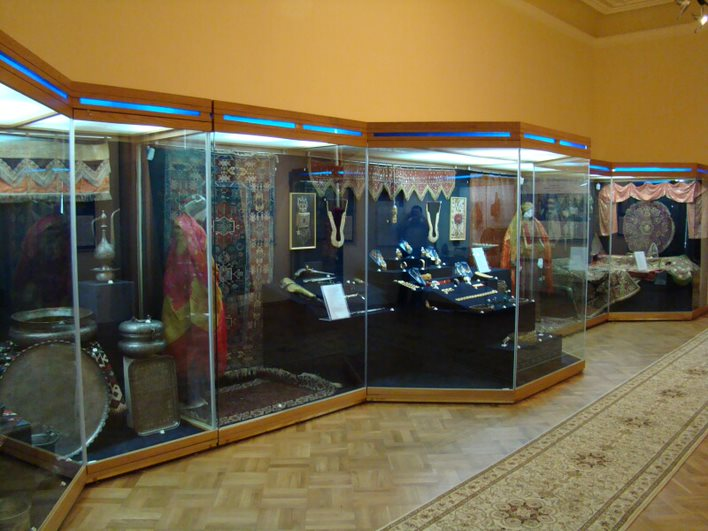
Cultural artifacts (Ethnographic Fund)

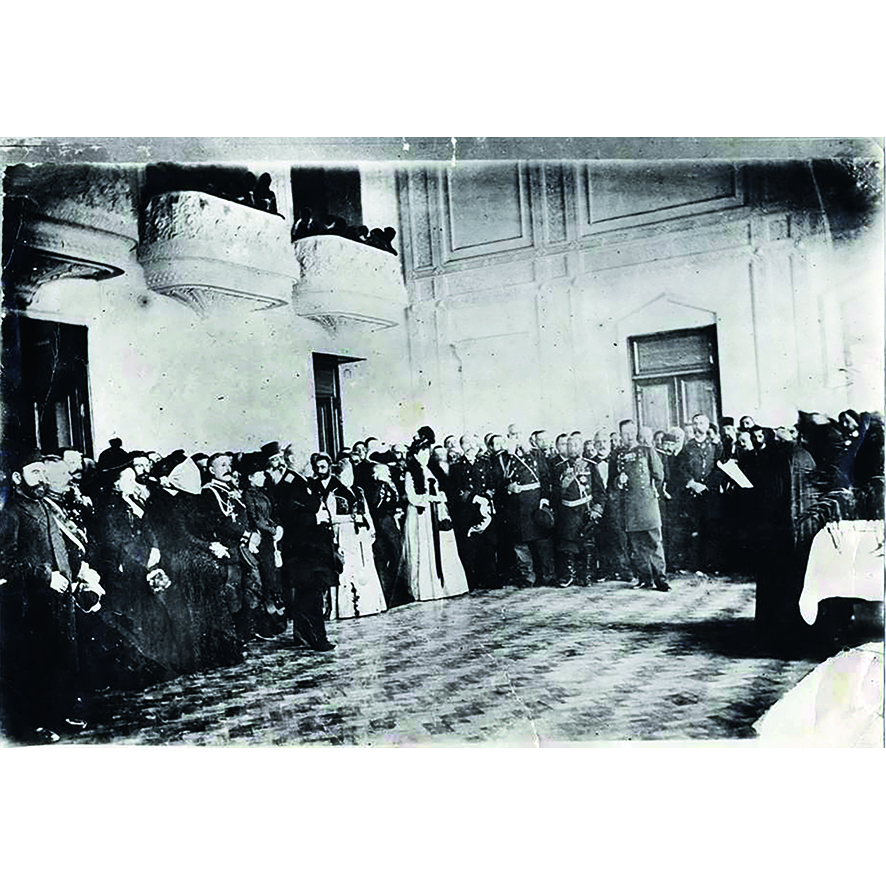
Opening ceremony of the Muslim boarding school for girls, founded by H.Z. Tagiev (1901) (Fund of Documentary Sources)

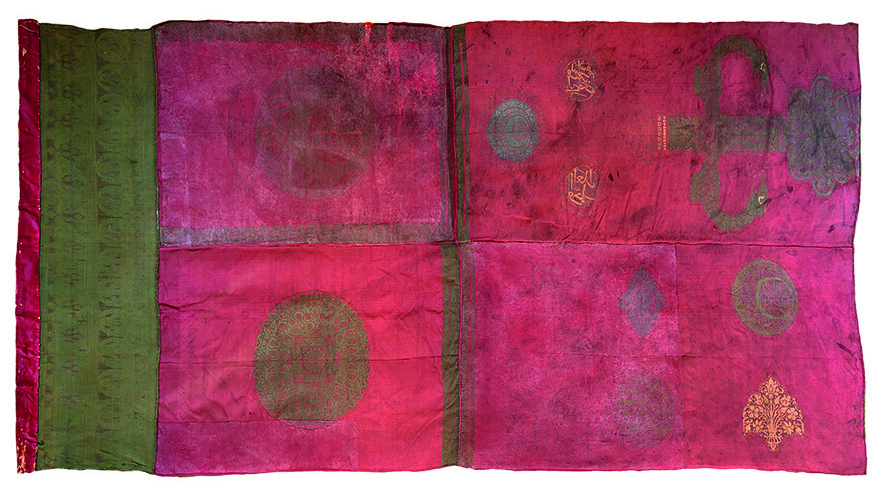
Flag of Baku Khanate (18th century) (Fund of Weapons and Banners)

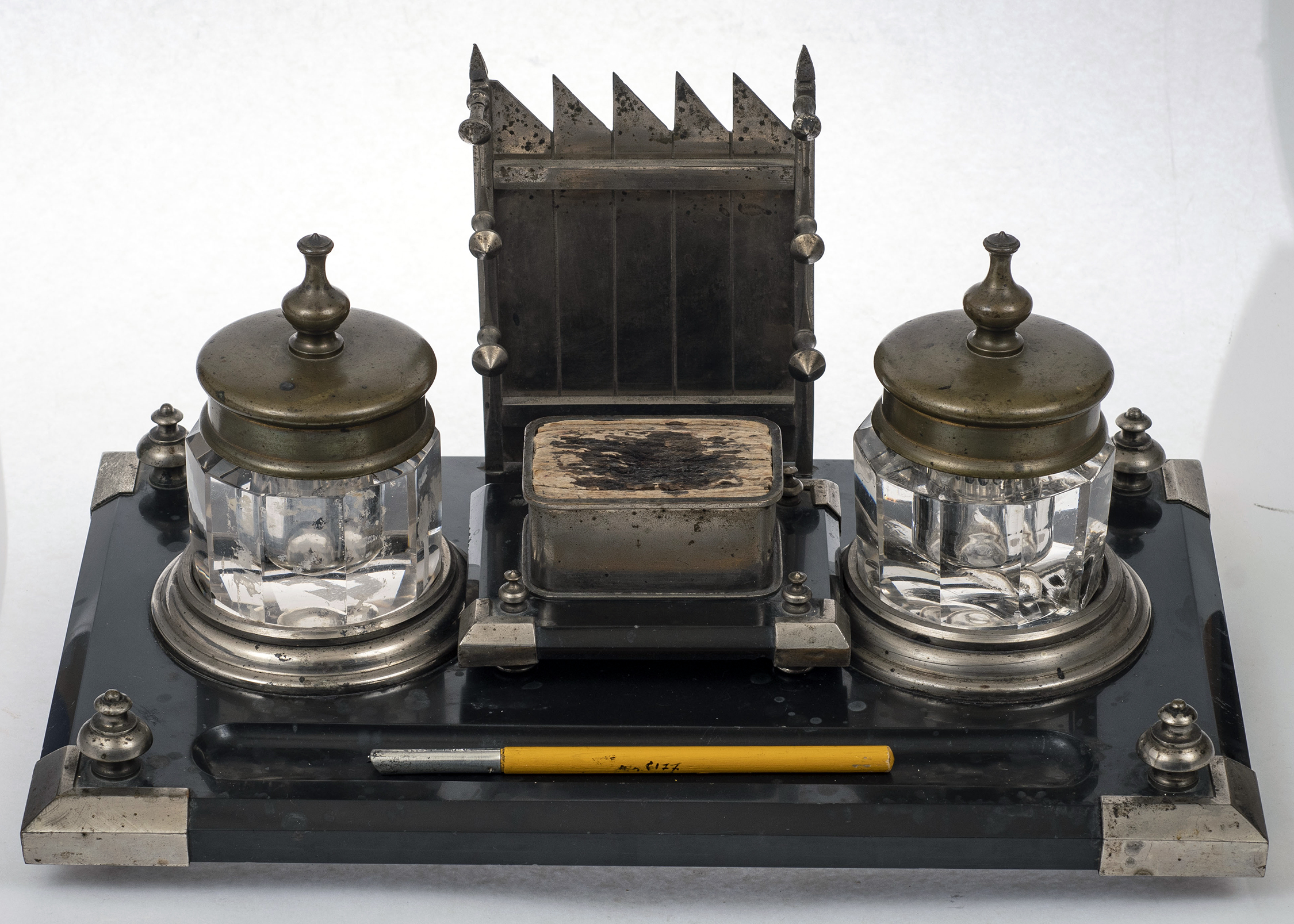
Writing set owned by Nariman Narimanov (Fund of Gifts and Memorabilia)

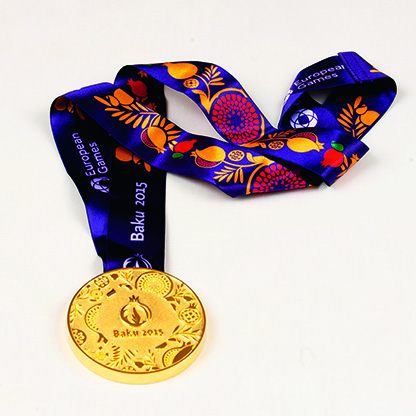
Gold medal of the 1st European Games (Fund of Auxiliary Historical Materials)

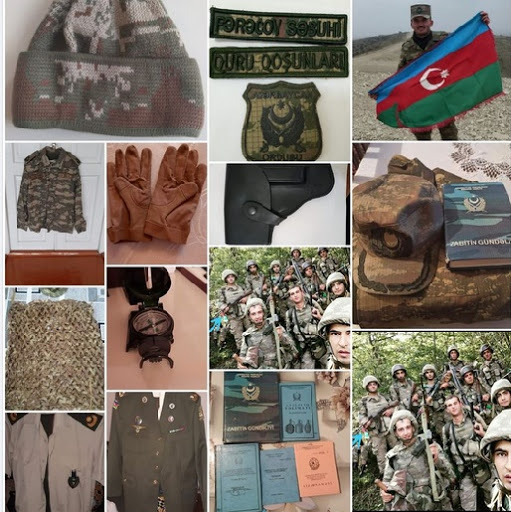
Materials belonging to martyrs and veterans (Patriotic War Fund)

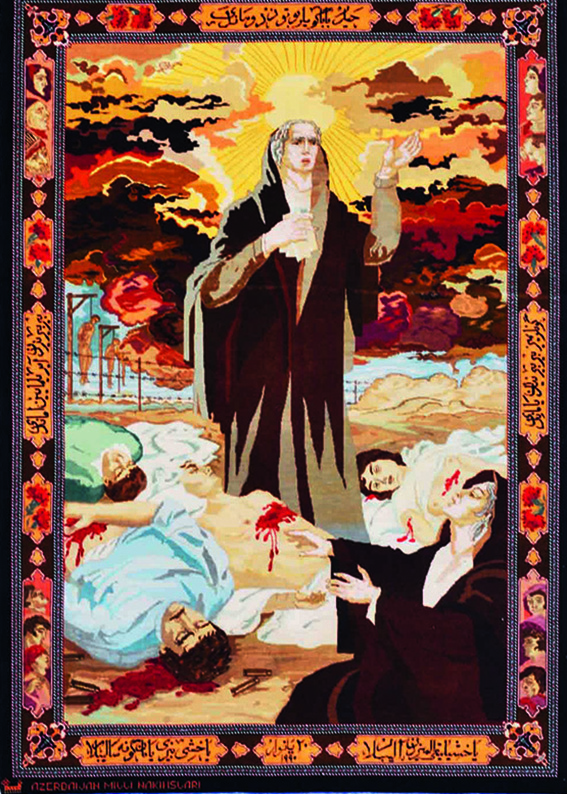
20 January (carpet, 1990) (Ethnographic Fund)

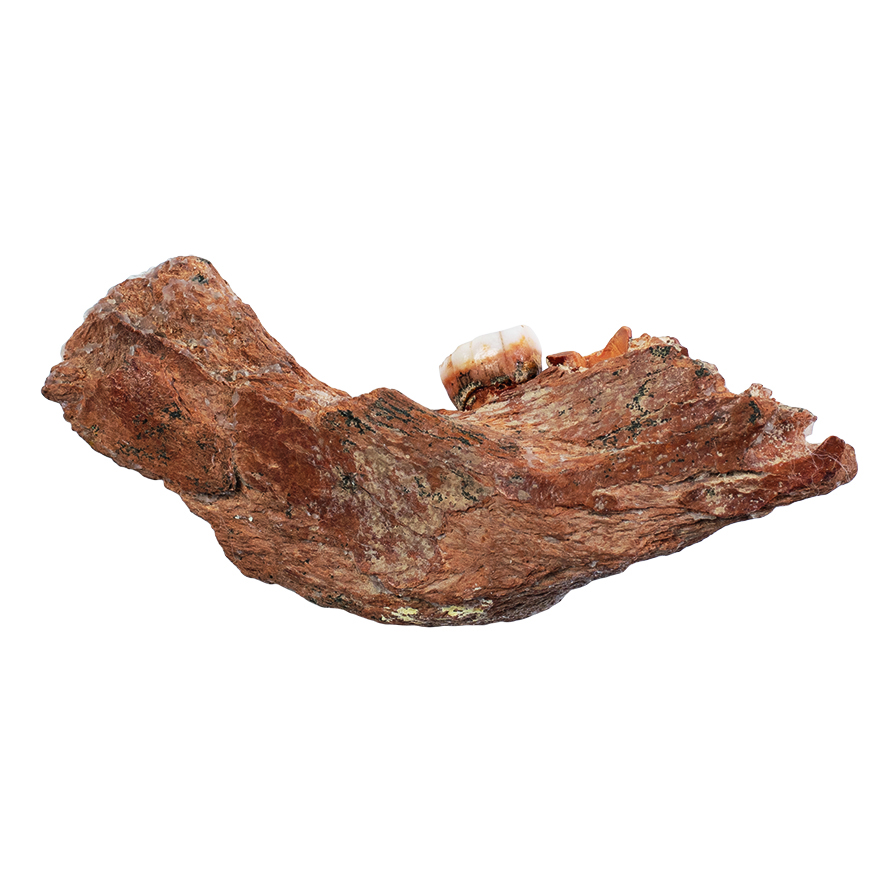
Lower Jaw of Azykhantrop

== Restoration laboratory ==
Since its establishment, the museum has carried out restoration and conservation efforts. Originally focused primarily on archaeological findings, there are now restoration specialists from a wider variety of fields who deal with materials including metal, ceramics, wood, textile (carpet and embroidery), painting, and graphics. To improve their professional skills, laboratory employees refer to new publications about restoration and conservation and apply advanced methods to their work.

The activity of the laboratory was presented in the museum's exhibition "The Second Life of Museum's Exhibits", held in 2010.

== Museum directors ==
Period	Director
1920–1921	Y. Stanevic
1921	S. Savelyev
1923	Mammad Malikov
1923	Sheikh Ismail
1923–1928	Davud Sharifov
1928–1932	Sero Manutsyan
1932–1934	A. Melkumyan
1934–1937	M. Salamov
1937	A. Klimov
1938–1939	B. Ishanov
1939	Leviatov V.N. (acting)
1939	D. Mehdiyev
1940–1942	Zeynal Aliyev (acting)
1942–1947	V. Leviatov
1947–1952	Saleh Gaziyev
1952–1953	Ishag Jafarzadeh
1953	V.I. Soxatsky (acting)
1953–1954	Mammad Efendiyev
1954–1961	Mammad Gaziyev
1961–1998	Pustakhanim Azizbeyova
1998	Ali Rajabli
1998–present	Naila Valikhanli

== See also ==
- Zeynalabdin Taghiyev
