= Darband =

Darband may refer to:

== Afghanistan ==
- Darabad, Afghanistan

== Armenia ==
- Karmrakar, Armenia, formerly Darband

== Iran ==
=== East Azerbaijan Province ===
- Darband, East Azerbaijan, a village in Hashtrud County

=== Gilan Province ===
- Darband, Astara, a village in Astara County
- Darband Cave, a Lower Paleolithic site

=== Hamadan Province ===
- Darband, Hamadan, a village in Bahar County

=== Hormozgan Province ===
- Darband Salah, a village in Bashagard County

=== Isfahan Province ===
- Darband, Fereydunshahr, a village in Fereydunshahr County

=== Kermanshah Province ===
- Darband Khizan, a village in Gilan-e Gharb County
- Darband Zard, a village in Kermanshah County
- Darband-e Zard-e Olya, a village in Salas-e Babajani County
- Darband-e Zard-e Sofla, a village in Salas-e Babajani County
- Darband, Kermanshah, a village in Sonqor County

=== Khuzestan Province ===
- Darband, Khuzestan, a village in Khorramshahr County, Khuzestan Province

=== Kurdistan Province ===
- Darband, Kurdistan, a village in Divandarreh County
- Darband-e Aziz, a village in Kamyaran County

=== Lorestan Province ===
- Darband, Lorestan, a village in Azna County
- Darband-e Kamalvand, a village in Khorramabad County

=== Markazi Province ===
- Darband, Markazi, a village in Saveh County
- Darband-e Loran, a village in Khomeyn County
- Darband-e Guyilagh, a village in Zarandieh County

=== North Khorasan Province ===
- Darband, Bojnord, a village in Bojnord County
- Darband, Jajrom, a village in Jajrom County
- Darband, Maneh and Samalqan, a village in Maneh and Samalqan County
- Darband Esfejir, a village in Faruj County
- Darband Rural District, an administrative subdivision of Jajrom County

=== Qazvin Province ===
- Darband, Qazvin, a village in Qazvin County, Qazvin Province, Iran

=== Razavi Khorasan Province ===
- Darband, Razavi Khorasan, a village in Khoshab County
- Darband-e Golriz, a village in Dargaz County
- Darband-e Olya, Dargaz, a village in Dargaz County
- Darband-e Sofla, Dargaz, a village in Dargaz County
- Darband-e Vosta, a village in Dargaz County
- Darband-e Olya, Sarakhs, a village in Sarakhs County
- Darband-e Sofla, Sarakhs, a village in Sarakhs County
- Darband, Taybad, a village in Taybad County

=== Semnan Province ===
- Darband, Semnan, a village in Mehdishahr County

=== Tehran Province ===
- Darband, Tehran, a village attached to Iran's capital Tehran

=== West Azerbaijan Province ===
- Darband, Naqadeh, a village in Naqadeh County
- Darband, Urmia, a village in Urmia County
- Darband, Baranduz, a village in Urmia County
- Darband, Silvaneh, a village in Urmia County

=== Zanjan Province ===
- Darband, Zanjan, a village in Khodabandeh County
- Darband, Tarom, a village in Tarom County

== Pakistan ==
- Darband, Mansehra, a town in Mansehra district
- Darband, Kech, a human settlement in Kech district

== Russia ==
- Derbent, a city in the Caucasus

== Tajikistan ==
- Darband, Tajikistan, a town or district in Tajikistan's Region of Republican Subordination

== See also ==
- Darvand
- Derbent (disambiguation)
