= Darbandi =

Darbandi (Persian: دربندئ) may refer to:

== Places ==
- Darbandi, North Khorasan
- Darbandi, Razavi Khorasan
- Darbandi-ye Olya (disambiguation), two locations, Razavi Khorasan Province
- Darbandi-ye Sofla (disambiguation), two locations, Razavi Khorasan Province
- Darbandi-ye Vosta, Razavi Khorasan Province

== People ==
Darbandi or al-Darbandi may also be a nisba, with the meaning "from Derbent". People with this nisba include:

- House of Derbent or the Darbandids, ruling dynasty in Shirvan
  - Sheikh Bahlul Darbandi
  - Amir Tahmuras Darbandi
- Fazel Darbandi, Qajar-era Iranian Shia cleric
