= Darvand, Iran =

Darvand (Persian: داروند) in Iran may also refer to:

- Darvand, Ilam
- Darvand-e Sartang, Ilam Province
- Darvand, Kermanshah
- Darvand, Harsin, Kermanshah Province
- Darvand-e Zard (disambiguation)

== See also ==
- Darband (disambiguation)
