= Owtanlu =

Owtanlu اوتانلو
- Village
- Location within Iran
- Coordinates: 37°26′03″N 58°58′15″E
- Country: Iran
- Province: Razavi Khorasan
- County: Dargaz
- Bakhsh: Central
- Rural District: Takab

Population (2006)
  - Total: 249
- Time zone: UTC+3:30 (IRST)
  - Summer (DST): UTC+4:30 (IRDT)

Owtanlu (Persian: اوتانلو, also Romanized as Owtānlū, Atanloo, Otānlū, and Ūtānlū; also known as Otalli, Otānlī, and Ūtalī) is a village in Takab Rural District, in the Central District of Dargaz County, Razavi Khorasan Province, Iran. At the 2006 census, its population was 249, in 75 families.
