= Golriz =

Golriz گلريز
- Village
- Location within Iran
- Coordinates: 37°27′57″N 59°07′36″E
- Country: Iran
- Province: Razavi Khorasan
- County: Dargaz
- Bakhsh: Central
- Rural District: Takab

Population (2006)
  - Total: 101
- Time zone: UTC+3:30 (IRST)
  - Summer (DST): UTC+4:30 (IRDT)

Golriz (Persian: گلريز, also Romanized as Golrīz) is a village in Takab Rural District, in the Central District of Dargaz County, Razavi Khorasan Province, Iran. At the 2006 census, its population was 101, in 26 families.
