= Rishkhar =

Rishkhvar ريشخوار
- Village
- Location within Iran
- Coordinates: 37°05′28″N 59°06′17″E
- Country: Iran
- Province: Razavi Khorasan
- County: Dargaz
- Bakhsh: Chapeshlu
- Rural District: Miankuh

Population (2006)
  - Total: 406
- Time zone: UTC+3:30 (IRST)
  - Summer (DST): UTC+4:30 (IRDT)

Rishkhvar (Persian: ريشخوار, also Romanized as Rīshkhvār; also known as Rīshkhār, Rushkhei, and Rūshkhī) is a village in Miankuh Rural District, Chapeshlu District, Dargaz County, Razavi Khorasan Province, Iran. At the 2006 census, its population was 406, in 94 families.
