= Sanqor =

Sanqor or Sonqor (Persian: سنق) may refer to:

- Sonqor, a city in Kermanshah Province
- Sonqor, Zanjan
- Sanqor-e Bala, Razavi Khorasan Province
- Sanqor-e Pain, Razavi Khorasan Province
- Sanqor-e Vasat, Razavi Khorasan Province
