= Gapi =

Gapi گپي
- Village
- Location within Iran
- Coordinates: 37°16′48″N 58°50′44″E
- Country: Iran
- Province: Razavi Khorasan
- County: Dargaz
- Bakhsh: Chapeshlu
- Rural District: Miankuh

Population (2006)
  - Total: 153
- Time zone: UTC+3:30 (IRST)
  - Summer (DST): UTC+4:30 (IRDT)

Gapi (Persian: گپي, also Romanized as Gapī, Gepī, and Gappī) is a village in Miankuh Rural District, Chapeshlu District, Dargaz County, Razavi Khorasan Province, Iran. At the 2006 census, its population was 153, in 50 families.
