= Kalateh-ye Jovin =

Kalateh-ye Jovin كلاته جوين
- Village
- Location within Iran
- Coordinates: 37°09′51″N 59°05′07″E
- Country: Iran
- Province: Razavi Khorasan
- County: Dargaz
- Bakhsh: Chapeshlu
- Rural District: Miankuh

Population (2006)
  - Total: 78
- Time zone: UTC+3:30 (IRST)
  - Summer (DST): UTC+4:30 (IRDT)

Kalateh-ye Jovin (Persian: كلاته جوين, also Romanized as Kalāteh-ye Jovīn) is a village in Miankuh Rural District, Chapeshlu District, Dargaz County, Razavi Khorasan Province, Iran. At the 2006 census, its population was 78, in 18 families.
