= Do Abi-ye Sofla =

Do Abi-ye Sofla دوابي سفلي
- Village
- Location within Iran
- Coordinates: 37°08′01″N 59°08′56″E
- Country: Iran
- Province: Razavi Khorasan
- County: Dargaz
- Bakhsh: Chapeshlu
- Rural District: Miankuh

Population (2006)
  - Total: 157
- Time zone: UTC+3:30 (IRST)
  - Summer (DST): UTC+4:30 (IRDT)

Do Abi-ye Sofla (Persian: دوابي سفلي, also Romanized as Do Ābī-ye Soflá; also known as Do Ābī-ye Pā’īn) is a village in Miankuh Rural District, Chapeshlu District, Dargaz County, Razavi Khorasan Province, Iran. According to 2006 census, its population was 157 persons consisting of just 32 families.
