= Sangbar, Dargaz =

Sangbar سنگبر
- Village
- Location within Iran
- Coordinates: 37°25′58″N 59°00′42″E
- Country: Iran
- Province: Razavi Khorasan
- County: Dargaz
- Bakhsh: Central
- Rural District: Takab

Population (2006)
  - Total: 95
- Time zone: UTC+3:30 (IRST)
  - Summer (DST): UTC+4:30 (IRDT)

Sangbar (Persian: سنگبر, also Romanized as Sang Bor) is a village in Takab Rural District, in the Central District of Dargaz County, Razavi Khorasan Province, Iran. At the 2006 census, its population was 95, in 28 families.
