= Kalateh-ye Kandi =

Kalateh-ye Kandi كلاته كندي
- Village
- Location within Iran
- Coordinates: 37°22′01″N 59°05′56″E
- Country: Iran
- Province: Razavi Khorasan
- County: Dargaz
- Bakhsh: Chapeshlu
- Rural District: Qara Bashlu

Population (2006)
  - Total: 67
- Time zone: UTC+3:30 (IRST)
  - Summer (DST): UTC+4:30 (IRDT)

Kalateh-ye Kandi (Persian: كلاته كندي, also Romanized as Kalāteh-ye Kandī) is a village in Qara Bashlu Rural District, Chapeshlu District, Dargaz County, Razavi Khorasan Province, Iran. At the 2006 census, its population was 67, in 17 families.
