= Nazarabad, Dargaz =

Nazarabad نظراباد
- Village
- Country: Iran
- Province: Razavi Khorasan
- County: Dargaz
- Bakhsh: Central
- Rural District: Takab

Population (2006)
  - Total: 24
- Time zone: UTC+3:30 (IRST)
  - Summer (DST): UTC+4:30 (IRDT)

Nazarabad (Persian: نظراباد, also Romanized as Naẓarābād) is a village in Takab Rural District, in the Central District of Dargaz County, Razavi Khorasan Province, Iran. At the 2006 census, its population was 24, in 7 families.
