= Khancheh =

Khvancheh خوانچه
- Village
- Location within Iran
- Coordinates: 37°27′38″N 59°03′46″E
- Country: Iran
- Province: Razavi Khorasan
- County: Dargaz
- Bakhsh: Central
- Rural District: Takab

Population (2006)
  - Total: 56
- Time zone: UTC+3:30 (IRST)
  - Summer (DST): UTC+4:30 (IRDT)

Khvancheh (Persian: خوانچه, also Romanized as Khvāncheh and Khāncheh) is a village in Takab Rural District, in the Central District of Dargaz County, Razavi Khorasan Province, Iran. At the 2006 census, its population was 56, in 16 families.
