= Dashkhani =

Dashkhani داشخاني
- Village
- Country: Iran
- Province: Razavi Khorasan
- County: Dargaz
- Bakhsh: Chapeshlu
- Rural District: Miankuh

Population (2006)
  - Total: 39
- Time zone: UTC+3:30 (IRST)
  - Summer (DST): UTC+4:30 (IRDT)

Dashkhani (Persian: داشخاني, also Romanized as Dāshkhānī; also known as Kalāteh-ye Bahbūd') is a village in Miankuh Rural District, Chapeshlu District, Dargaz County, Razavi Khorasan Province, Iran. At the 2006 census, its population was 39, in 10 families.
