= Sugaldi =

Sugaldi سوگلدي
- Village
- Location within Iran
- Coordinates: 37°17′30″N 59°01′49″E
- Country: Iran
- Province: Razavi Khorasan
- County: Dargaz
- Bakhsh: Chapeshlu
- Rural District: Qara Bashlu

Population (2006)
  - Total: 112
- Time zone: UTC+3:30 (IRST)
  - Summer (DST): UTC+4:30 (IRDT)

Sugaldi (Persian: سوگلدي, also Romanized as Sūgaldī; also known as Sūkadlī, Sookatlī, Sūgatlī, Sugetli, Sūkat, and Sūkatlī) is a village in Qara Bashlu Rural District, Chapeshlu District, Dargaz County, Razavi Khorasan Province, Iran. At the 2006 census, its population was 112, in 20 families.
