= Hoseynabad-e Sedaqat =

Hoseynabad-e Sedaqat حسين ابادصداقت
- Village
- Location within Iran
- Coordinates: 37°25′52″N 59°09′21″E
- Country: Iran
- Province: Razavi Khorasan
- County: Dargaz
- Bakhsh: Central
- Rural District: Takab

Population (2006)
  - Total: 64
- Time zone: UTC+3:30 (IRST)
  - Summer (DST): UTC+4:30 (IRDT)

Hoseynabad-e Sedaqat (Persian: حسين ابادصداقت, also Romanized as Ḩoseynābād-e Şedāqat) is a village in Takab Rural District, in the Central District of Dargaz County, Razavi Khorasan Province, Iran.

== Demographics ==
At the 2006 census, its population was 64, in 18 families.
