= Qeshlaq-e Pain Hesar =

Qeshlaq-e Pain Hesar قشلاق پائين حصار
- Village
- Country: Iran
- Province: Razavi Khorasan
- County: Dargaz
- Bakhsh: Chapeshlu
- Rural District: Miankuh

Population (2006)
  - Total: 95
- Time zone: UTC+3:30 (IRST)
  - Summer (DST): UTC+4:30 (IRDT)

Qeshlaq-e Pain Hesar (Persian: قشلاق پائين حصار, also Romanized as Qeshlāq-e Pā’īn Ḩeşār; also known as Qeshlāq-e Āqāyī) is a village in Miankuh Rural District, Chapeshlu District, Dargaz County, Razavi Khorasan Province, Iran. At the 2006 census, its population was 95, in 20 families.
