= Yanbolaq =

Yanbolaq يانبلاق
- Village
- Location within Iran
- Coordinates: 37°26′25″N 59°09′38″E
- Country: Iran
- Province: Razavi Khorasan
- County: Dargaz
- Bakhsh: Central
- Rural District: Takab

Population (2006)
  - Total: 83
- Time zone: UTC+3:30 (IRST)
  - Summer (DST): UTC+4:30 (IRDT)

Yanbolaq (Persian: يانبلاق, also Romanized as Yānbolāq; also known as Yūmbolāgh and Yānbolāgh-e Jadīd) is a village in Takab Rural District, in the Central District of Dargaz County, Razavi Khorasan Province, Iran. At the 2006 census, its population was 83, in 22 families.
