= Kalateh-ye Gurni =

Kalateh-ye Gurni كلاته گورني
- Village
- Country: Iran
- Province: Razavi Khorasan
- County: Dargaz
- Bakhsh: Chapeshlu
- Rural District: Miankuh

Population (2006)
  - Total: 45
- Time zone: UTC+3:30 (IRST)
  - Summer (DST): UTC+4:30 (IRDT)

Kalateh-ye Gurni (Persian: كلاته گورني, also Romanized as Kalāteh-ye Gūrnī) is a village in Miankuh Rural District, Chapeshlu District, Dargaz County, Razavi Khorasan Province, Iran. At the 2006 census, its population was 45, in 13 families.
