= Dudanlu =

Village in Razavi Khorasan Province, Iran

Dudanlu دودانلو
- Village
- Location within Iran
- Coordinates: 37°24′25″N 58°55′16″E
- Country: Iran
- Province: Razavi Khorasan
- County: Dargaz
- Bakhsh: Central
- Rural District: Takab

Population (2006)
  - Total: 155
- Time zone: UTC+3:30 (IRST)
  - Summer (DST): UTC+4:30 (IRDT)

Dudanlu (Persian: دودانلو, also Romanized as Dūdānlū and Do Dānlū) is a village in Takab Rural District, in the Central District of Dargaz County, Razavi Khorasan Province, Iran. At the 2006 census, its population was 155, with 44 families.
