= Shur Kal =

Shur Kal شوركال
- Village
- Location within Iran
- Coordinates: 37°26′07″N 59°12′37″E
- Country: Iran
- Province: Razavi Khorasan
- County: Dargaz
- Bakhsh: Central
- Rural District: Takab

Population (2006)
  - Total: 169
- Time zone: UTC+3:30 (IRST)
  - Summer (DST): UTC+4:30 (IRDT)

Shur Kal (Persian: شوركال, also Romanized as Shūr Kāl; also known as Kāl Shūr Şedāqat) is a village in Takab Rural District, in the Central District of Dargaz County, Razavi Khorasan Province, Iran. At the 2006 census, its population was 169, in 36 families.
