= Qalehcheh, Razavi Khorasan =

Qalehcheh قلعه چه
- Village
- Location within Iran
- Coordinates: 37°25′34″N 59°01′05″E
- Country: Iran
- Province: Razavi Khorasan
- County: Dargaz
- Bakhsh: Central
- Rural District: Takab

Population (2006)
  - Total: 97
- Time zone: UTC+3:30 (IRST)
  - Summer (DST): UTC+4:30 (IRDT)

Qalehcheh (Persian: قلعه چه, also Romanized as Qal‘ehcheh; also known as Qal‘echeh) is a village in Takab Rural District, in the Central District of Dargaz County, Razavi Khorasan Province, Iran. At the 2006 census, its population was 97, in 30 families.
