= Quljoq =

Quljoq قولجق
- Village
- Location within Iran
- Coordinates: 37°18′27″N 58°59′30″E
- Country: Iran
- Province: Razavi Khorasan
- County: Dargaz
- Bakhsh: Chapeshlu
- Rural District: Qara Bashlu

Population (2006)
  - Total: 161
- Time zone: UTC+3:30 (IRST)
  - Summer (DST): UTC+4:30 (IRDT)

Quljoq (Persian: قولجق, also Romanized as Qūljoq and Qoljoq) is a village in Qara Bashlu Rural District, Chapeshlu District, Dargaz County, Razavi Khorasan Province, Iran. At the 2006 census, its population was 161, in 40 families.
