= Sanqoz =

Sanqoz (Persian: سنقز) may refer to:

- Sanqoz-e Bala
- Sanqoz-e Pain
- Sanqoz-e Vosta
