= Qozloq, Razavi Khorasan =

Qozloq قزلق
- Village
- Location within Iran
- Coordinates: 37°17′52″N 59°05′49″E
- Country: Iran
- Province: Razavi Khorasan
- County: Dargaz
- Bakhsh: Chapeshlu
- Rural District: Qara Bashlu

Population (2006)
  - Total: 145
- Time zone: UTC+3:30 (IRST)
  - Summer (DST): UTC+4:30 (IRDT)

Qozloq (Persian: قزلق; also known as Kuzluk and Kūz̄ūkh) is a village in Qara Bashlu Rural District, Chapeshlu District, Dargaz County, Razavi Khorasan Province, Iran. At the 2006 census, its population was 145, in 34 families.
