= Ramazan Qaleh =

Ramazan Qaleh رمضان قلعه
- Village
- Location within Iran
- Coordinates: 37°30′12″N 59°01′36″E
- Country: Iran
- Province: Razavi Khorasan
- County: Dargaz
- Bakhsh: Central
- Rural District: Takab

Population (2006)
  - Total: 236
- Time zone: UTC+3:30 (IRST)
  - Summer (DST): UTC+4:30 (IRDT)

Ramazan Qaleh (Persian: رمضان قلعه, also Romanized as Ramaẕān Qal‘eh; also known as Qal‘eh-i-Ramazān) is a village in Takab Rural District, in the Central District of Dargaz County, Razavi Khorasan Province, Iran. At the 2006 census, its population was 236, in 54 families.
