= Kalateh-ye Abdalluhab =

Kalateh-ye Abdalluhab كلاته عبدالوهاب
- Village
- Country: Iran
- Province: Razavi Khorasan
- County: Dargaz
- Bakhsh: Central
- Rural District: Takab

Population (2006)
  - Total: 21
- Time zone: UTC+3:30 (IRST)
  - Summer (DST): UTC+4:30 (IRDT)

Kalateh-ye Abdalluhab (Persian: كلاته عبدالوهاب, also romanized as Kalāteh-ye ʿAbdāllūhāb) is a village in Takab Rural District, in the Central District of Dargaz County, Razavi Khorasan Province, Iran. At the 2006 census, its population was 21, in 5 families.
