= Abbas Qaleh =

Abbas Qaleh عباس قلعه
- Village
- Location within Iran
- Coordinates: 37°23′33″N 59°02′07″E
- Country: Iran
- Province: Razavi Khorasan
- County: Dargaz
- Bakhsh: Chapeshlu
- Rural District: Qara Bashlu

Population (2006)
  - Total: 134
- Time zone: UTC+3:30 (IRST)
  - Summer (DST): UTC+4:30 (IRDT)

Abbas Qaleh (Persian: عباس قلعه, also Romanized as ‘Abbās Qal‘eh; also known as Qal‘eh-ye ‘Abbās and Qal‘eh-ye ‘Abbāsī) is a village in Qara Bashlu Rural District, Chapeshlu District, Dargaz County, Razavi Khorasan Province, Iran. At the 2006 census, its population was 134, in 40 families.

== See also ==
- List of cities, towns and villages in Razavi Khorasan Province
