= Nosratabad, Dargaz =

Nosratabad نصرت اباد
- Village
- Location within Iran
- Coordinates: 37°26′00″N 59°10′00″E
- Country: Iran
- Province: Razavi Khorasan
- County: Dargaz
- Bakhsh: Central
- Rural District: Takab

Population (2006)
  - Total: 181
- Time zone: UTC+3:30 (IRST)
  - Summer (DST): UTC+4:30 (IRDT)

Nosratabad (Persian: نصرت اباد, also Romanized as Noşratābād; also known as Noşratābād-e Jadīd) is a village in Takab Rural District, in the Central District of Dargaz County, Razavi Khorasan Province, Iran. At the 2006 census, its population was 181, in 47 families.
