= Jeghal =

Jeghal جغال
- Village
- Location within Iran
- Coordinates: 37°17′50″N 59°01′15″E
- Country: Iran
- Province: Razavi Khorasan
- County: Dargaz
- Bakhsh: Chapeshlu
- Rural District: Qara Bashlu

Population (2006)
  - Total: 112
- Time zone: UTC+3:30 (IRST)
  - Summer (DST): UTC+4:30 (IRDT)

Jeghal (Persian: جغال, also Romanized as Jeghāl) is a village in Qara Bashlu Rural District, Chapeshlu District, Dargaz County, Razavi Khorasan Province, Iran. At the 2006 census, its population was 112, in 25 families.
