= Ezzatabad, Razavi Khorasan =

Ezzatabad عزت اباد
- Village
- Location within Iran
- Coordinates: 37°24′48″N 58°59′30″E
- Country: Iran
- Province: Razavi Khorasan
- County: Dargaz
- Bakhsh: Central
- Rural District: Takab

Population (2006)
  - Total: 35
- Time zone: UTC+3:30 (IRST)
  - Summer (DST): UTC+4:30 (IRDT)

Ezzatabad (Persian: عزت اباد, also romanized as ‘Ezzatābād) is a village in Takab Rural District, in the Central District of Dargaz County, Razavi Khorasan Province, Iran. In the 2006 census, its population was 35, in 9 families.
