= Aq Cheshmeh, Razavi Khorasan =

Aq Cheshmeh اق چشمه
- Village
- Location within Iran
- Coordinates: 37°26′57″N 59°03′10″E
- Country: Iran
- Province: Razavi Khorasan
- County: Dargaz
- Bakhsh: Central
- Rural District: Takab

Population (2006)
  - Total: 85
- Time zone: UTC+3:30 (IRST)
  - Summer (DST): UTC+4:30 (IRDT)

Aq Cheshmeh (Persian: اق چشمه, also romanized as Āq Cheshmeh) is a village in Takab Rural District, in the Central District of Dargaz County, Razavi Khorasan Province, Iran. At the 2006 census, its population was 85, in 19 families.

== See also ==
- List of cities, towns and villages in Razavi Khorasan Province
