= Komaj Khvor =

Komaj Khor كماج خور
- Village
- Location within Iran
- Coordinates: 37°22′27″N 59°08′34″E
- Country: Iran
- Province: Razavi Khorasan
- County: Dargaz
- Bakhsh: Chapeshlu
- Rural District: Qara Bashlu

Population (2006)
  - Total: 219
- Time zone: UTC+3:30 (IRST)
  - Summer (DST): UTC+4:30 (IRDT)

Komaj Khor (Persian: كماج خور, also Romanized as Komāj Khor; also known as Komāch Khor and Komājkhor) is a village in Qara Bashlu Rural District, Chapeshlu District, Dargaz County, Razavi Khorasan Province, Iran. At the 2006 census, its population was 219, in 61 families.
