= Haqverdi =

Haqverdi حق وردي
- Village
- Location within Iran
- Coordinates: 37°23′04″N 59°03′22″E
- Country: Iran
- Province: Razavi Khorasan
- County: Dargaz
- Bakhsh: Chapeshlu
- Rural District: Qara Bashlu

Population (2006)
  - Total: 200
- Time zone: UTC+3:30 (IRST)
  - Summer (DST): UTC+4:30 (IRDT)

Haqverdi (Persian: حق وردي, also Romanized as Ḩaqverdī and Ḩaqūrūdī) is a village in Qara Bashlu Rural District, Chapeshlu District, Dargaz County, Razavi Khorasan Province, Iran. At the 2006 census, its population was 200, in 55 families.
