= Hesar, Lotfabad =

Village in Razavi Khorasan province, Iran

Hesar Persian: حصار
- Village
- Location within Iran
- Coordinates: 37°26′15″N 59°23′30″E
- Country: Iran
- Province: Razavi Khorasan
- County: Dargaz
- District: Lotfabad
- Rural District: Dibaj

Population (2016)
  - Total: 224
- Time zone: UTC+3:30 (IRST)

Hesar (Persian: حصار) (Note: Also romanized as Ḩeşār) is a village in Dibaj Rural District of Lotfabad District in Dargaz County, Razavi Khorasan province, Iran.

== Demographics ==
=== Population ===
At the time of the 2006 National Census, the village's population was 286 in 100 households. The following census in 2011 counted 276 people in 84 households. The 2016 census measured the population of the village as 224 people in 78 households.
