= Zangelanlu =

Village in Razavi Khorasan province, Iran

Zangelanlu Persian: زنگلانلو
- Village
- Location within Iran
- Coordinates: 37°13′57″N 59°14′43″E
- Country: Iran
- Province: Razavi Khorasan
- County: Dargaz
- District: Lotfabad
- Rural District: Zangelanlu

Population (2016)
  - Total: 671
- Time zone: UTC+3:30 (IRST)

Zangelanlu (Persian: زنگلانلو) (Note: Also romanized as Zangelānlū; also known as Zangalānli and Zānganānlī) is a village in Zangelanlu Rural District of Lotfabad District in Dargaz County, Razavi Khorasan province, Iran.

== Demographics ==
=== Population ===
At the time of the 2006 National Census, the village's population was 802 in 187 households. The following census in 2011 counted 780 people in 238 households. The 2016 census measured the population of the village as 671 people in 214 households.
