= Moradabad, Dargaz =

Village in Razavi Khorasan province, Iran

Moradabad Persian: مراداباد
- Village
- Country: Iran
- Province: Razavi Khorasan
- County: Dargaz
- District: Lotfabad
- Rural District: Zangelanlu

Population (2016)
  - Total: 88
- Time zone: UTC+3:30 (IRST)

Moradabad (Persian: مراداباد) (Note: Also romanized as Morādābād) is a village in Zangelanlu Rural District of Lotfabad District in Dargaz County, Razavi Khorasan province, Iran.

== Demographics ==
=== Population ===
At the time of the 2006 National Census, the village's population was 91 in 16 households. The following census in 2011 counted 89 people in 20 households. The 2016 census measured the population of the village as 88 people in 24 households.
