= Besharat, Razavi Khorasan =

Village in Razavi Khorasan province, Iran

Besharat Persian: بشارت
- Village
- Location within Iran
- Coordinates: 37°15′17″N 59°10′04″E
- Country: Iran
- Province: Razavi Khorasan
- County: Dargaz
- District: Chapeshlu
- Rural District: Qarah Bashlu

Population (2016)
  - Total: 502
- Time zone: UTC+3:30 (IRST)

Besharat (Persian: بشارت) (Note: Also romanized as Beshārat) is a village in Qarah Bashlu Rural District of Chapeshlu District in Dargaz County, Razavi Khorasan province, Iran.

== Demographics ==
=== Population ===
At the time of the 2006 National Census, the village's population was 479 in 91 households. The following census in 2011 counted 461 people in 111 households. The 2016 census measured the population of the village as 502 people in 145 households, the most populous in its rural district.
