= Asadkhan, Razavi Khorasan =

Asadkhan اسدخان
- Village
- Country: Iran
- Province: Razavi Khorasan
- County: Dargaz
- Bakhsh: Chapeshlu
- Rural District: Qara Bashlu

Population (2006)
  - Total: 125
- Time zone: UTC+3:30 (IRST)
  - Summer (DST): UTC+4:30 (IRDT)

Asadkhan (Persian: اسدخان, also Romanized as Āsadkhān) is a village in Qara Bashlu Rural District, Chapeshlu District, Dargaz County, Razavi Khorasan Province, Iran. At the 2006 census, its population was 125, in 23 families.

== See also ==
- List of cities, towns and villages in Razavi Khorasan Province
