= Qorbanabad, Dargaz =

Village in Razavi Khorasan province, Iran

Qorbanabad Persian: قربان اباد
- Village
- Location within Iran
- Coordinates: 37°28′13″N 59°22′11″E
- Country: Iran
- Province: Razavi Khorasan
- County: Dargaz
- District: Lotfabad
- Rural District: Dibaj

Population (2016)
  - Total: 92
- Time zone: UTC+3:30 (IRST)

Qorbanabad (Persian: قربان اباد) (Note: Also romanized as Qorbānābād) is a village in Dibaj Rural District of Lotfabad District in Dargaz County, Razavi Khorasan province, Iran.

== Demographics ==
=== Population ===
At the time of the 2006 National Census, the village's population was 103 in 28 households. The following census in 2011 counted 115 people in 33 households. The 2016 census measured the population of the village as 92 people in 30 households.
