= Qazqan Darreh =

Village in Razavi Khorasan province, Iran

Qazqan Darreh Persian: قزقان دره
- Village
- Location within Iran
- Coordinates: 37°21′57″N 59°20′35″E
- Country: Iran
- Province: Razavi Khorasan
- County: Dargaz
- District: Lotfabad
- Rural District: Dibaj

Population (2016)
  - Total: 522
- Time zone: UTC+3:30 (IRST)

Qazqan Darreh (Persian: قزقان دره) (Note: Also romanized as Qazqān Darreh) is a village in Dibaj Rural District of Lotfabad District in Dargaz County, Razavi Khorasan province, Iran.

== Demographics ==
=== Population ===
At the time of the 2006 National Census, the village's population was 343 in 57 households. The following census in 2011 counted 476 people in 113 households. The 2016 census measured the population of the village as 522 people in 142 households.
