= Kapkan, Razavi Khorasan =

Village in Razavi Khorasan province, Iran

Kapkan Persian: كپكان
- Village
- Location within Iran
- Coordinates: 37°15′03″N 58°54′36″E
- Country: Iran
- Province: Razavi Khorasan
- County: Dargaz
- District: Chapeshlu
- Rural District: Miankuh

Population (2016)
  - Total: 157
- Time zone: UTC+3:30 (IRST)

Kapkan (Persian: كپكان) (Note: Also romanized as Kapkān; also known as Kabkan, Koopkan, and Kūpkan) is a village in, and the capital of, Miankuh Rural District in Chapeshlu District of Dargaz County, Razavi Khorasan province, Iran.

== Demographics ==
=== Population ===
At the time of the 2006 National Census, the village's population was 192 in 64 households. The following census in 2011 counted 209 people in 48 households. The 2016 census measured the population of the village as 157 people in 43 households.
