= Khakhian =

Village in Razavi Khorasan province, Iran

Khakhian Persian: خاخيان
- Village
- Location within Iran
- Coordinates: 37°29′14″N 59°02′10″E
- Country: Iran
- Province: Razavi Khorasan
- County: Dargaz
- District: Central
- Rural District: Takab

Population (2016)
  - Total: 240
- Time zone: UTC+3:30 (IRST)

Khakhian (Persian: خاخيان) (Note: Also romanized as Khākhīān) is a village in, and the capital of, Takab Rural District in the Central District of Dargaz County, Razavi Khorasan province, Iran.

== Demographics ==
=== Population ===
At the time of the 2006 National Census, the village's population was 266 in 66 households. The following census in 2011 counted 321 people in 85 households. The 2016 census measured the population of the village as 240 people in 72 households.
