= Towqi =

Village in Razavi Khorasan province, Iran

Towqi Persian: توقي
- Village
- Location within Iran
- Coordinates: 37°30′24″N 59°12′09″E
- Country: Iran
- Province: Razavi Khorasan
- County: Dargaz
- District: Lotfabad
- Rural District: Dibaj

Population (2016)
  - Total: 85
- Time zone: UTC+3:30 (IRST)

Towqi (Persian: توقي) (Note: Also romanized as Ţowqī and Towqqey) is a village in Dibaj Rural District of Lotfabad District in Dargaz County, Razavi Khorasan province, Iran.

== Demographics ==
=== Population ===
At the time of the 2006 National Census, the village's population was 125 in 32 households. The following census in 2011 counted 126 people in 35 households. The 2016 census measured the population of the village as 85 people in 29 households.
