= Artian =

Village in Razavi Khorasan province, Iran

Artian Persian: ارتيان
- Village
- Location within Iran
- Coordinates: 37°29′06″N 59°04′45″E
- Country: Iran
- Province: Razavi Khorasan
- County: Dargaz
- District: Central
- Rural District: Takab

Population (2016)
  - Total: 451
- Time zone: UTC+3:30 (IRST)

Artian (Persian: ارتيان) (Note: Also romanized as Artīān) is a village in Takab Rural District of the Central District in Dargaz County, Razavi Khorasan province, Iran.

== Demographics ==
=== Population ===
At the time of the 2006 National Census, the village's population was 408 in 100 households. The following census in 2011 counted 442 people in 129 households. The 2016 census measured the population of the village as 451 people in 138 households.
