= Qazan-e Beyk =

Village in Razavi Khorasan province, Iran

Qazan-e Beyk Persian: قازان بيك
- Village
- Location within Iran
- Coordinates: 37°15′41″N 59°17′50″E
- Country: Iran
- Province: Razavi Khorasan
- County: Dargaz
- District: Lotfabad
- Rural District: Zangelanlu

Population (2016)
  - Total: 401
- Time zone: UTC+3:30 (IRST)

Qazan-e Beyk (Persian: قازان بيك) (Note: Also romanized as Qāzān-e Beyk; also known as Qāzān-e Beyg) is a village in Zangelanlu Rural District of Lotfabad District in Dargaz County, Razavi Khorasan province, Iran.

== Demographics ==
=== Population ===
At the time of the 2006 National Census, the village's population was 468 in 122 households. The following census in 2011 counted 476 people in 141 households. The 2016 census measured the population of the village as 401 people in 121 households.
