= Nowabad-e Espian =

Nowabad-e Espian نواباداسپيان
- Village
- Location within Iran
- Coordinates: 37°18′35″N 59°09′59″E
- Country: Iran
- Province: Razavi Khorasan
- County: Dargaz
- Bakhsh: Chapeshlu
- Rural District: Qara Bashlu

Population (2006)
  - Total: 30
- Time zone: UTC+3:30 (IRST)
  - Summer (DST): UTC+4:30 (IRDT)

Nowabad-e Espian (Persian: نواباداسپيان, also romanized as Nowābād-e Espīān; also known as Eşpahān, Espīān, Ispāīn, and Lāpīān) is a village in Qara Bashlu Rural District, Chapeshlu District, Dargaz County, Razavi Khorasan Province, Iran. At the 2006 census, its population was 30, in 4 families.
