= Shams Khan, Iran =

Village in Razavi Khorasan province, Iran

Shams Khan Persian: شمس خان
- Village
- Location within Iran
- Coordinates: 37°16′09″N 59°20′05″E
- Country: Iran
- Province: Razavi Khorasan
- County: Dargaz
- District: Lotfabad
- Rural District: Zangelanlu

Population (2016)
  - Total: 272
- Time zone: UTC+3:30 (IRST)

Shams Khan (Persian: شمس خان) (Note: Also romanized as Shams Khān; also known as Shams Khān Qal‘eh and Shamsī Khān Qal‘eh) is a village in, and the capital of, Zangelanlu Rural District in Lotfabad District of Dargaz County, Razavi Khorasan province, Iran.

== Demographics ==
=== Population ===
At the time of the 2006 National Census, the village's population was 294 in 87 households. The following census in 2011 counted 298 people in 96 households. The 2016 census measured the population of the village as 272 people in 84 households.
