= Yaqul =

Village in Razavi Khorasan province, Iran

Yaqul Persian: ياقول
- Village
- Location within Iran
- Coordinates: 37°30′45″N 59°09′24″E
- Country: Iran
- Province: Razavi Khorasan
- County: Dargaz
- District: Lotfabad
- Rural District: Dibaj

Population (2016)
  - Total: 104
- Time zone: UTC+3:30 (IRST)

Yaqul (Persian: ياقول) (Note: Also romanized as Yāqūl) is a village in Dibaj Rural District of Lotfabad District in Dargaz County, Razavi Khorasan province, Iran.

== Demographics ==
=== Population ===
At the time of the 2006 National Census, the village's population was 189 in 55 households. The following census in 2011 counted 169 people in 51 households. The 2016 census measured the population of the village as 104 people in 32 households.
