= Pol-e Gerd =

Village in Razavi Khorasan province, Iran

Pol-e Gerd Persian: پل گرد
- Village
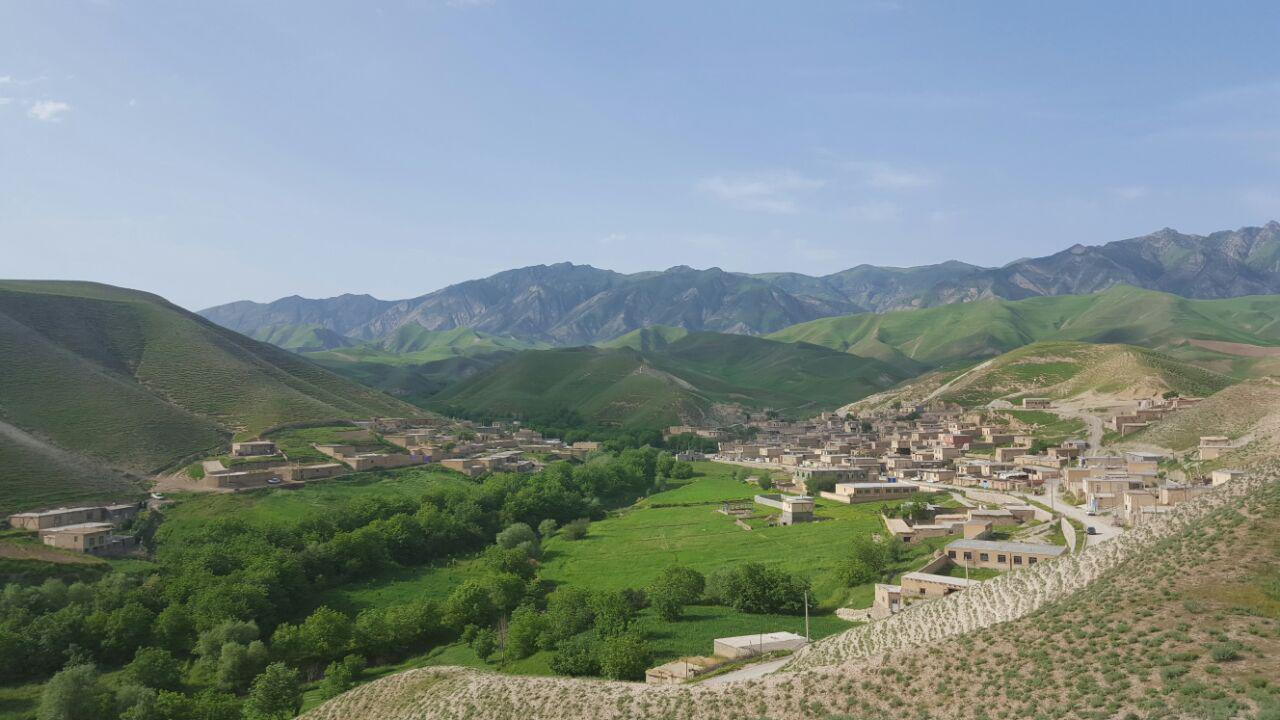
- The village of Pol-e Gerd

- Location within Iran
- Coordinates: 37°09′23″N 59°22′31″E
- Country: Iran
- Province: Razavi Khorasan
- County: Dargaz
- District: Lotfabad
- Rural District: Zangelanlu

Population (2016)
  - Total: 584
- Time zone: UTC+3:30 (IRST)

Pol-e Gerd (Persian: پلگرد) is a village in Zangelanlu Rural District of Lotfabad District in Dargaz County, Razavi Khorasan province, Iran.

== Demographics ==
=== Population ===
At the time of the 2006 National Census, the village's population was 631 in 166 households. The following census in 2011 counted 553 people in 184 households. The 2016 census measured the population of the village as 584 people in 193 households.
