= Gol Khandan, Dargaz =

Village in Razavi Khorasan province, Iran

Gol Khandan Persian: گلخندان
- Village
- Location within Iran
- Coordinates: 37°29′36″N 59°09′22″E
- Country: Iran
- Province: Razavi Khorasan
- County: Dargaz
- District: Central
- Rural District: Takab

Population (2016)
  - Total: 203
- Time zone: UTC+3:30 (IRST)

Gol Khandan (Persian: گلخندان) (Note: Also romanized as Gol Khandān) is a village in Takab Rural District of the Central District in Dargaz County, Razavi Khorasan province, Iran.

== Demographics ==
=== Population ===
At the time of the 2006 National Census, the village's population was 285 in 77 households. The following census in 2011 counted 250 people in 87 households. The 2016 census measured the population of the village as 203 people in 72 households.
