= Daghdar =

Village in Razavi Khorasan province, Iran

Daghdar Persian: داغدار
- Village
- Location within Iran
- Coordinates: 37°20′42″N 58°59′36″E
- Country: Iran
- Province: Razavi Khorasan
- County: Dargaz
- District: Chapeshlu
- Rural District: Qarah Bashlu

Population (2016)
  - Total: 487
- Time zone: UTC+3:30 (IRST)

Daghdar (Persian: داغدار) (Note: Also romanized as Dāghdār; also known as Dāqdār) is a village in Qarah Bashlu Rural District of Chapeshlu District in Dargaz County, Razavi Khorasan province, Iran.

== Demographics ==
=== Population ===
At the time of the 2006 National Census, the village's population was 570 in 130 households. The following census in 2011 counted 551 people in 158 households. The 2016 census measured the population of the village as 487 people in 147 households.
