= Ilanjiq =

Village in Razavi Khorasan province, Iran

Ilanjiq Persian: ايلانجيق
- Village
- Location within Iran
- Coordinates: 37°21′18″N 59°09′29″E
- Country: Iran
- Province: Razavi Khorasan
- County: Dargaz
- District: Chapeshlu
- Rural District: Qarah Bashlu

Population (2016)
  - Total: 324
- Time zone: UTC+3:30 (IRST)

Ilanjiq (Persian: ايلانجيق) (Note: Also romanized as Īlānjīq; also known as Īlānjoq) is a village in Qarah Bashlu Rural District of Chapeshlu District in Dargaz County, Razavi Khorasan province, Iran.

== Demographics ==
=== Population ===
At the time of the 2006 National Census, the village's population was 301 in 68 households. The following census in 2011 counted 289 people in 91 households. The 2016 census measured the population of the village as 324 people in 96 households.
