= Dehesht-e Olya =

Village in Razavi Khorasan province, Iran

Dehesht-e Olya Persian: دهشت عليا
- Village
- Location within Iran
- Coordinates: 37°14′27″N 58°57′29″E
- Country: Iran
- Province: Razavi Khorasan
- County: Dargaz
- District: Chapeshlu
- Rural District: Miankuh

Population (2016)
  - Total: 332
- Time zone: UTC+3:30 (IRST)

Dehesht-e Olya (Persian: دهشت عليا) (Note: Also romanized as Dehesht-e ‘Olyā; also known as Dehesht) is a village in Miankuh Rural District of Chapeshlu District in Dargaz County, Razavi Khorasan province, Iran.

== Demographics ==
=== Population ===
At the time of the 2006 National Census, the village's population was 358 in 84 households. The following census in 2011 counted 310 people in 81 households. The 2016 census measured the population of the village as 332 people in 95 households.
