= Hatam Qaleh =

Village in Razavi Khorasan province, Iran

Hatam Qaleh Persian: حاتم قلعه
- Village
- Location within Iran
- Coordinates: 37°18′32″N 59°21′58″E
- Country: Iran
- Province: Razavi Khorasan
- County: Dargaz
- District: Lotfabad
- Rural District: Dibaj

Population (2016)
  - Total: 825
- Time zone: UTC+3:30 (IRST)

Hatam Qaleh (Persian: حاتم قلعه) (Note: Also romanized as Ḩātam Qal‘eh) is a village in Dibaj Rural District of Lotfabad District in Dargaz County, Razavi Khorasan province, Iran.

== Demographics ==
=== Population ===
At the time of the 2006 National Census, the village's population was 930 in 251 households. The following census in 2011 counted 899 people in 288 households. The 2016 census measured the population of the village as 825 people in 271 households. It was the most populous village in its rural district.
