= Tirgan, Iran =

Village in Razavi Khorasan province, Iran

Tirgan Persian: تيرگان
- Village
- Location within Iran
- Coordinates: 37°08′39″N 59°19′37″E
- Country: Iran
- Province: Razavi Khorasan
- County: Dargaz
- District: Lotfabad
- Rural District: Zangelanlu

Population (2016)
  - Total: 1,138
- Time zone: UTC+3:30 (IRST)

Tirgan (Persian: تيرگان) (Note: Also romanized as Tīrgān) is a village in Zangelanlu Rural District of Lotfabad District in Dargaz County, Razavi Khorasan province, Iran.

== Demographics ==
=== Population ===
At the time of the 2006 National Census, the village's population was 1,398 in 315 households. The following census in 2011 counted 1,207 people in 326 households. The 2016 census measured the population of the village as 1,138 people in 330 households, the most populous in its rural district.
