= Hasanabad, Dargaz =

Village in Razavi Khorasan province, Iran

Hasanabad Persian: حسن اباد
- Village
- Location within Iran
- Coordinates: 37°20′25″N 59°08′17″E
- Country: Iran
- Province: Razavi Khorasan
- County: Dargaz
- District: Chapeshlu
- Rural District: Qarah Bashlu

Population (2016)
  - Total: 250
- Time zone: UTC+3:30 (IRST)

Hasanabad (Persian: حسن اباد) (Note: Also romanized as Ḩasanābād) is a village in Qarah Bashlu Rural District of Chapeshlu District in Dargaz County, Razavi Khorasan province, Iran.

== Demographics ==
=== Population ===
At the time of the 2006 National Census, the village's population was 266 in 58 households. The following census in 2011 counted 251 people in 67 households. The 2016 census measured the population of the village as 250 people in 74 households.
