= Khadem Anlu =

Village in Razavi Khorasan province, Iran

Khadem Anlu Persian: خادمانلو
- Village
- Location within Iran
- Coordinates: 37°16′57″N 58°47′43″E
- Country: Iran
- Province: Razavi Khorasan
- County: Dargaz
- District: Chapeshlu
- Rural District: Miankuh

Population (2016)
  - Total: 712
- Time zone: UTC+3:30 (IRST)

Khadem Anlu (Persian: خادمانلو) (Note: Also romanized as Khādem Ānlū and Khadmanlū) is a village in Miankuh Rural District of Chapeshlu District in Dargaz County, Razavi Khorasan province, Iran.

== Demographics ==
=== Population ===
At the time of the 2006 National Census, the village's population was 562 in 154 households. The following census in 2011 counted 634 people in 180 households. The 2016 census measured the population of the village as 712 people in 216 households.
