= Kalateh-ye Khalilabad =

Village in Razavi Khorasan province, Iran

Kalateh-ye Khalilabad Persian: كلاته خليل اباد
- Village
- Location within Iran
- Country: Iran
- Province: Razavi Khorasan
- County: Dargaz
- District: Lotfabad
- Rural District: Zangelanlu

Population (2016)
  - Total: 174
- Time zone: UTC+3:30 (IRST)

Kalateh-ye Khalilabad (Persian: كلاته خليل اباد) (Note: Also romanized as Kalāteh-ye Khalīlābād; also known as Kalāteh-ye Khalīlzādeh and Khalīlābād (خليل اباد)) is a village in Zangelanlu Rural District of Lotfabad District in Dargaz County, Razavi Khorasan province, Iran.

== Demographics ==
=== Population ===
At the time of the 2006 National Census, the village's population was 134 in 28 households. The following census in 2011 counted 163 people in 40 households. The 2016 census measured the population of the village as 174 people in 41 households.
