= Meyab, Razavi Khorasan =

Village in Razavi Khorasan province, Iran

Meyab Persian: مياب
- Village
- Location within Iran
- Coordinates: 37°16′06″N 58°46′43″E
- Country: Iran
- Province: Razavi Khorasan
- County: Dargaz
- District: Chapeshlu
- Rural District: Miankuh

Population (2016)
  - Total: 735
- Time zone: UTC+3:30 (IRST)

Meyab (Persian: مياب) (Note: Also romanized as Meyāb and Mīāb; also known as Mayu and Mīow) is a village in Miankuh Rural District of Chapeshlu District in Dargaz County, Razavi Khorasan province, Iran.

== Demographics ==
=== Population ===
At the time of the 2006 National Census, the village's population was 668 in 177 households. The following census in 2011 counted 711 people in 220 households. The 2016 census measured the population of the village as 735 people in 210 households, the most populous in its rural district.
