= Kalateh-ye Tut =

Village in Razavi Khorasan province, Iran

Kalateh-ye Tut Persian: كلاته توت
- Village
- Location within Iran
- Country: Iran
- Province: Razavi Khorasan
- County: Dargaz
- District: Lotfabad
- Rural District: Zangelanlu

Population (2016)
  - Total: 100
- Time zone: UTC+3:30 (IRST)

Kalateh-ye Tut (Persian: كلاته توت) (Note: Also romanized as Kalāteh-ye Tūt; also known as Tūt (توت)) is a village in Zangelanlu Rural District of Lotfabad District in Dargaz County, Razavi Khorasan province, Iran.

== Demographics ==
=== Population ===
At the time of the 2006 National Census, the village's population was 143 in 23 households. The following census in 2011 counted 104 people in 29 households. The 2016 census measured the population of the village as 100 people in 29 households.
