= Taj ol Din, Razavi Khorasan =

Village in Razavi Khorasan province, Iran

Taj ol Din Persian: تاج الدين
- Village
- Location within Iran
- Coordinates: 37°24′44″N 58°56′35″E
- Country: Iran
- Province: Razavi Khorasan
- County: Dargaz
- District: Central
- Rural District: Takab

Population (2016)
  - Total: 1,084
- Time zone: UTC+3:30 (IRST)

Taj ol Din (Persian: تاج الدين) (Note: Also romanized as Tāj ol Dīn; also known as Tāj ed Dīn, Tāj od Dīn, Tazadin, and Tāzeh Deh) is a village in Takab Rural District of the Central District in Dargaz County, Razavi Khorasan province, Iran.

== Demographics ==
=== Population ===
At the time of the 2006 National Census, the village's population was 1,083 in 305 households. The following census in 2011 counted 1,028 people in 288 households. The 2016 census measured the population of the village as 1,084 people in 366 households, the most populous in its rural district.
