= Sadat, Razavi Khorasan =

Village in Razavi Khorasan province, Iran

Sadat Persian: سادات
- Village
- Location within Iran
- Coordinates: 37°24′45″N 59°02′01″E
- Country: Iran
- Province: Razavi Khorasan
- County: Dargaz
- District: Chapeshlu
- Rural District: Qarah Bashlu

Population (2016)
  - Total: 266
- Time zone: UTC+3:30 (IRST)

Sadat (Persian: سادات) (Note: Also romanized as Sādāt) is a village in Qarah Bashlu Rural District of Chapeshlu District in Dargaz County, Razavi Khorasan province, Iran.

== Demographics ==
=== Population ===
At the time of the 2006 National Census, the village's population was 276 in 91 households. The following census in 2011 counted 281 people in 108 households. The 2016 census measured the population of the village as 266 people in 100 households.
