= Hesar, Chapeshlu =

Village in Razavi Khorasan province, Iran

Hesar Persian: حصار
- Village
- Location within Iran
- Coordinates: 37°11′52″N 59°02′16″E
- Country: Iran
- Province: Razavi Khorasan
- County: Dargaz
- District: Chapeshlu
- Rural District: Miankuh

Population (2016)
  - Total: 276
- Time zone: UTC+3:30 (IRST)

Hesar (Persian: حصار) (Note: Also romanized as Ḩeşār) is a village in Miankuh Rural District of Chapeshlu District in Dargaz County, Razavi Khorasan province, Iran.

== Demographics ==
=== Population ===
At the time of the 2006 National Census, the village's population was 301 in 66 households. The following census in 2011 counted 252 people in 71 households. The 2016 census measured the population of the village as 276 people in 80 households.
