= Sadabad, Dargaz =

Village in Razavi Khorasan province, Iran

Sadabad Persian: سعداباد
- Village
- Location within Iran
- Coordinates: 37°26′48″N 59°00′24″E
- Country: Iran
- Province: Razavi Khorasan
- County: Dargaz
- District: Central
- Rural District: Takab

Population (2016)
  - Total: 322
- Time zone: UTC+3:30 (IRST)

Sadabad (Persian: سعداباد) (Note: Also romanized as Sa‘dābād; also known as Sadaua and Sadaveh) is a village in Takab Rural District of the Central District in Dargaz County, Razavi Khorasan province, Iran.

== Demographics ==
=== Population ===
At the time of the 2006 National Census, the village's population was 428 in 138 households. The following census in 2011 counted 378 people in 137 households. The 2016 census measured the population of the village as 322 people in 112 households.
