= Yekkeh Bagh, Dargaz =

Village in Razavi Khorasan province, Iran

Yekkeh Bagh Persian: يكه باغ
- Village
- Location within Iran
- Coordinates: 37°11′23″N 59°23′56″E
- Country: Iran
- Province: Razavi Khorasan
- County: Dargaz
- District: Lotfabad
- Rural District: Zangelanlu

Population (2016)
  - Total: 692
- Time zone: UTC+3:30 (IRST)

Yekkeh Bagh (Persian: يكه باغ) (Note: Also romanized as Yekkeh Bāgh, Yekkehbagh, and Yekkehbāgh) is a village in Zangelanlu Rural District of Lotfabad District in Dargaz County, Razavi Khorasan province, Iran.

== Demographics ==
=== Population ===
At the time of the 2006 National Census, the village's population was 782 in 180 households. The following census in 2011 counted 786 people in 207 households. The 2016 census measured the population of the village as 692 people in 203 households.
