= Ghaffarabad =

Ghaffarabad (Persian: غفاراباد) may refer to:

- Ghaffarabad, Kerman
- Ghaffarabad, Razavi Khorasan
