= Asad Khan =

Asad Khan (Persian: اسد خان) may refer to:

- Asad Khan (cricketer) (born 1997), Afghan cricketer
- Asad Khan (sitarist) (born 1982), Indian sitarist and music composer
- Asad Khan (military officer)
- Asad Khan (Bijapuri noble) (died 1549), minister of the Bijapur Sultanate
- Asad Khan (Mughal noble), 17th–18th century minister of the Mughal Empire
- Asad Khan, Khuzestan, a village in Iran
- Asadkhan, Razavi Khorasan, a village in Iran
- Asad Ahmed Khan, a fictional character in the Indian soap opera Qubool Hai
- Asad Ali Khan (1937–2011), Indian musician who played the plucked string instrument rudra veena
- Asad Jahangir Khan (born 1945), former first-class cricketer and senior police officer in Pakistan
- Asad Ullah Khan, Indian microbiologist and biochemist
- Asad Majeed Khan, Pakistani ambassador to the United States
