= Dowlatabad, Dargaz =

Village in Razavi Khorasan province, Iran

Dowlatabad Persian: دولتاباد
- Village
- Location within Iran
- Coordinates: 37°15′22″N 59°17′19″E
- Country: Iran
- Province: Razavi Khorasan
- County: Dargaz
- District: Lotfabad
- Rural District: Zangelanlu

Population (2016)
  - Total: 402
- Time zone: UTC+3:30 (IRST)

Dowlatabad (Persian: دولتاباد) (Note: Also romanized as Dowlatābād) is a village in Zangelanlu Rural District of Lotfabad District in Dargaz County, Razavi Khorasan province, Iran.

== Demographics ==
=== Population ===
At the time of the 2006 National Census, the village's population was 437 in 102 households. The following census in 2011 counted 454 people in 125 households. The 2016 census measured the population of the village as 402 people in 122 households.
