= Qareh Quyunlu, Razavi Khorasan =

Village in Razavi Khorasan province, Iran

Qareh Quyunlu Persian: قره قويونلو
- Village
- Location within Iran
- Coordinates: 37°26′41″N 58°59′19″E
- Country: Iran
- Province: Razavi Khorasan
- County: Dargaz
- District: Central
- Rural District: Takab

Population (2016)
  - Total: 315
- Time zone: UTC+3:30 (IRST)

Qareh Quyunlu (Persian: قره قويونلو) (Note: Also romanized as Qarah Qowyūnlū, Qareh Qowyūnlū, and Qareh Qūyūnlū) is a village in Takab Rural District of the Central District in Dargaz County, Razavi Khorasan province, Iran.

== Demographics ==
=== Population ===
At the time of the 2006 National Census, the village's population was 445 in 142 households. The following census in 2011 counted 349 people in 125 households. The 2016 census measured the population of the village as 315 people in 128 households.
