= Do Abi-ye Olya =

Village in Razavi Khorasan province, Iran

Do Abi-ye Olya Persian: دوابي عليا
- Village
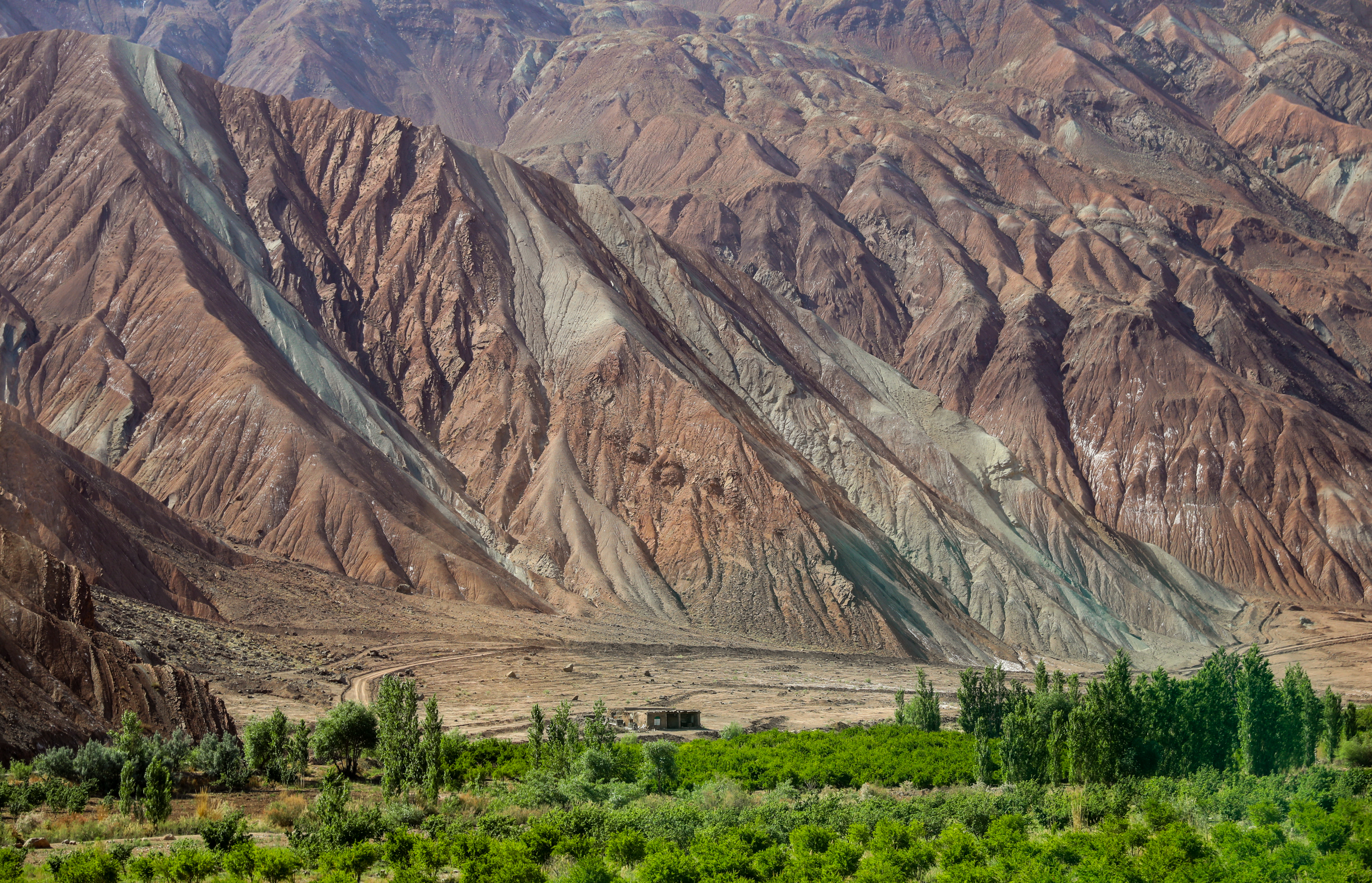
- Landscape near the village of Do Abi-ye Olya

- Location within Iran
- Coordinates: 37°07′53″N 59°09′07″E
- Country: Iran
- Province: Razavi Khorasan
- County: Dargaz
- District: Chapeshlu
- Rural District: Miankuh

Population (2016)
  - Total: 165
- Time zone: UTC+3:30 (IRST)

Do Abi-ye Olya (Persian: دوابي عليا) (Note: Also romanized as Do Ābī-ye ‘Olyā; also known as Do Ābī-ye Bālā) is a village in Miankuh Rural District of Chapeshlu District in Dargaz County, Razavi Khorasan province, Iran.

== Demographics ==
=== Population ===
At the time of the 2006 National Census, the village's population was 197 in 43 households. The following census in 2011 counted 95 people in 27 households. The 2016 census measured the population of the village as 165 people in 46 households.
