= Sefar Qaleh =

Village in Razavi Khorasan province, Iran

Sefar Qaleh Persian: صفرقلعه
- Village
- Location within Iran
- Coordinates: 37°30′23″N 59°13′29″E
- Country: Iran
- Province: Razavi Khorasan
- County: Dargaz
- District: Lotfabad
- Rural District: Dibaj

Population (2016)
  - Total: 64
- Time zone: UTC+3:30 (IRST)

Sefar Qaleh (Persian: صفرقلعه) (Note: Also romanized as Şefar Qal‘eh) is a village in Dibaj Rural District of Lotfabad District in Dargaz County, Razavi Khorasan province, Iran.

== Demographics ==
=== Population ===
At the time of the 2006 National Census, the village's population was 105 in 41 households. The following census in 2011 counted 92 people in 36 households. The 2016 census measured the population of the village as 64 people in 21 households.
