= Yengi Qaleh, Razavi Khorasan =

Village in Razavi Khorasan province, Iran

Yengi Qaleh Persian: ينگي قلعه
- Village
- Location within Iran
- Coordinates: 37°21′37″N 59°03′43″E
- Country: Iran
- Province: Razavi Khorasan
- County: Dargaz
- District: Chapeshlu
- Rural District: Qarah Bashlu

Population (2016)
  - Total: 394
- Time zone: UTC+3:30 (IRST)

Yengi Qaleh (Persian: ينگي قلعه) (Note: Also romanized as Yengī Qal‘eh; also known as Bengeh Qal‘eh) is a village in Qarah Bashlu Rural District of Chapeshlu District in Dargaz County, Razavi Khorasan province, Iran.

== Demographics ==
=== Population ===
At the time of the 2006 National Census, the village's population was 428 in 104 households. The following census in 2011 counted 391 people in 116 households. The 2016 census measured the population of the village as 394 people in 122 households.
