= Mir Qaleh =

Village in Razavi Khorasan province, Iran

Mir Qaleh Persian: ميرقلعه
- Village
- Location within Iran
- Coordinates: 37°30′28″N 59°16′43″E
- Country: Iran
- Province: Razavi Khorasan
- County: Dargaz
- District: Lotfabad
- Rural District: Dibaj

Population (2016)
  - Total: 184
- Time zone: UTC+3:30 (IRST)

Mir Qaleh (Persian: ميرقلعه) (Note: Also romanized as Mīr Qal‘eh) is a village in Dibaj Rural District of Lotfabad District in Dargaz County, Razavi Khorasan province, Iran.

== Demographics ==
=== Population ===
At the time of the 2006 National Census, the village's population was 177 in 56 households. The following census in 2011 counted 176 people in 53 households. The 2016 census measured the population of the village as 184 people in 59 households.
