= Parkand =

Village in Razavi Khorasan province, Iran

Parkand Persian: پرکند
- Village
- Location within Iran
- Coordinates: 37°23′59″N 59°02′54″E
- Country: Iran
- Province: Razavi Khorasan
- County: Dargaz
- District: Chapeshlu
- Rural District: Qarah Bashlu

Population (2016)
  - Total: 352
- Time zone: UTC+3:30 (IRST)

Parkand (Persian: پرکند) is a village in Qarah Bashlu Rural District of Chapeshlu District in Dargaz County, Razavi Khorasan province, Iran.

== Demographics ==
=== Population ===
At the time of the 2006 National Census, the village's population was 407 in 104 households. The following census in 2011 counted 367 people in 113 households. The 2016 census measured the population of the village as 352 people in 117 households.
