= Darband-e Golriz =

Darband-e Golriz دربندگلريز
- Village
- Location within Iran
- Coordinates: 37°28′40″N 59°08′45″E
- Country: Iran
- Province: Razavi Khorasan
- County: Dargaz
- Bakhsh: Central
- Rural District: Takab

Population (2006)
  - Total: 16
- Time zone: UTC+3:30 (IRST)
  - Summer (DST): UTC+4:30 (IRDT)

Darband-e Golriz (Persian: دربندگلريز, also Romanized as Darband-e Golrīz; also known as Kalāteh-ye Darband and Darband) is a village in Takab Rural District, in the Central District of Dargaz County, Razavi Khorasan Province, Iran. At the 2006 census, its population was 16, in 4 families.
