= Shiligan =

Village in Razavi Khorasan province, Iran

Shiligan Persian: شيليگان
- Village
- Location within Iran
- Coordinates: 37°28′57″N 59°22′30″E
- Country: Iran
- Province: Razavi Khorasan
- County: Dargaz
- District: Lotfabad
- Rural District: Dibaj

Population (2016)
  - Total: 639
- Time zone: UTC+3:30 (IRST)

Shiligan (Persian: شيليگان) (Note: Also romanized as Shīlīgān; also known as Shīlgān) is a village in, and the capital of, Dibaj Rural District in Lotfabad District of Dargaz County, Razavi Khorasan province, Iran.

== Demographics ==
=== Population ===
At the time of the 2006 National Census, the village's population was 756 in 215 households. The following census in 2011 counted 705 people in 220 households. The 2016 census measured the population of the village as 639 people in 230 households.
