= Besh Darreh =

Besh Darreh (Persian: بشدره) may refer to:

- Besh Darreh, North Khorasan
- Bacheh Darreh, North Khorasan
- Besh Darreh, Razavi Khorasan
