= Lapian =

Lapian may refer to:

- Elyah Lopian
- Lapian, Iran, a village in Razavi Khorasan Province
