= Jafarabad-e Sofla, North Khorasan =

Village in North Khorasan province, Iran

Jafarabad-e Sofla Persian: جعفرابادسفلي
- Village
- Location within Iran
- Coordinates: 37°12′07″N 58°17′27″E
- Country: Iran
- Province: North Khorasan
- County: Faruj
- District: Khabushan
- Rural District: Titkanlu

Population (2016)
  - Total: 719
- Time zone: UTC+3:30 (IRST)

Jafarabad-e Sofla (Persian: جعفرابادسفلي) (Note: Also romanized as Ja‘farābād-e Soflá; also known as Ja‘farābād, Ja‘farābād-e Fārūj, and Ja‘farābād-e Pā’īn) is a village in Titkanlu Rural District (Note: Formerly Khabushan Rural District) of Khabushan District in Faruj County, North Khorasan province, Iran.

== Demographics ==
=== Population ===
At the time of the 2006 National Census, the village's population was 863 in 223 households. The 2011 census counted 848 people in 242 households. The 2016 census measured the population of the village as 719 people in 228 households.
