= Valiabad, Faruj =

Village in North Khorasan province, Iran

Valiabad Persian: ولي اباد
- Village
- Location within Iran
- Coordinates: 37°12′28″N 58°17′07″E
- Country: Iran
- Province: North Khorasan
- County: Faruj
- District: Khabushan
- Rural District: Titkanlu

Population (2016)
  - Total: 105
- Time zone: UTC+3:30 (IRST)

Valiabad (Persian: ولي اباد) (Note: Also romanized as Valīābād) is a village in Titkanlu Rural District (Note: Formerly Khabushan Rural District) of Khabushan District in Faruj County, North Khorasan province, Iran.

== Demographics ==
=== Population ===
At the time of the 2006 National Census, the village's population was 111 in 27 households. The 2011 census counted 104 people in 24 households. The 2016 census measured the population of the village as 105 people in 33 households.
