= Khabushan =

Village in North Khorasan province, Iran

Khabushan Persian: خبوشان
- Village
- Location within Iran
- Coordinates: 37°18′46″N 58°17′29″E
- Country: Iran
- Province: North Khorasan
- County: Faruj
- District: Khabushan
- Rural District: Hesar

Population (2016)
  - Total: 413
- Time zone: UTC+3:30 (IRST)

Khabushan (Persian: خبوشان) (Note: Also romanized as Khabūshān) is a village in Hesar Rural District of Khabushan District in Faruj County, North Khorasan province, Iran.

== Demographics ==
=== Population ===
At the time of the 2006 National Census, the village's population was 413 in 126 households. The following census in 2011 counted 397 people in 137 households. The 2016 census measured the population of the village as 413 people in 154 households.
