= Hajji Taqi =

Village in North Khorasan province, Iran

Hajji Taqi Persian: حاجي تقي
- Village
- Location within Iran
- Coordinates: 37°15′39″N 58°17′56″E
- Country: Iran
- Province: North Khorasan
- County: Faruj
- District: Khabushan
- Rural District: Titkanlu

Population (2016)
  - Total: 767
- Time zone: UTC+3:30 (IRST)

Hajji Taqi (Persian: حاجي تقي) (Note: Also romanized as Ḩājjī Taqī; also known as Qal‘eh Ḩājī Taqī, Qal‘eh-ye Hājītaqī, and Qal‘eh-ye Ḩājjī Taqī) is a village in Titkanlu Rural District (Note: Formerly Khabushan Rural District) of Khabushan District in Faruj County, North Khorasan province, Iran.

== Demographics ==
=== Population ===
At the time of the 2006 National Census, the village's population was 882 in 219 households. The 2011 census counted 832 people in 244 households. The 2016 census measured the population of the village as 767 people in 248 households.
