= Cheqer =

Cheqer or Chaqar (Persian: چقر) may refer to:

- Cheqer, Golestan
- Chaqar, Markazi
- Chaqar, Razavi Khorasan

== See also ==
- Chaqar Besh Qardash
- Chaqar Shir Melli
