= Kuran-e Torkiyeh =

Village in North Khorasan province, Iran

Kuran-e Torkiyeh Persian: كوران تركيه
- Village
- Location within Iran
- Coordinates: 37°23′32″N 58°16′26″E
- Country: Iran
- Province: North Khorasan
- County: Faruj
- District: Khabushan
- Rural District: Hesar

Population (2016)
  - Total: 667
- Time zone: UTC+3:30 (IRST)

Kuran-e Torkiyeh (Persian: كوران تركيه) (Note: Also romanized as Kūrān Torkīyeh and Kūrān-e Torkīyeh; also known as Kūrān) is a village in Hesar Rural District of Khabushan District in Faruj County, North Khorasan province, Iran.

== Demographics ==
=== Population ===
At the time of the 2006 National Census, the village's population was 643 in 175 households. The following census in 2011 counted 603 people in 199 households. The 2016 census measured the population of the village as 667 people in 211 households.
