= Yam, North Khorasan =

Village in North Khorasan province, Iran

Yam Persian: يام
- Village
- Location within Iran
- Coordinates: 37°16′11″N 58°15′08″E
- Country: Iran
- Province: North Khorasan
- County: Faruj
- District: Khabushan
- Rural District: Hesar

Population (2016)
  - Total: 1,328
- Time zone: UTC+3:30 (IRST)

Yam (Persian: يام) (Note: Also romanized as Yām) is a village in Hesar Rural District of Khabushan District in Faruj County, North Khorasan province, Iran.

== Demographics ==
=== Population ===
At the time of the 2006 National Census, the village's population was 1,428 in 400 households. The following census in 2011 counted 1,408 people in 454 households. The 2016 census measured the population of the village as 1,328 people in 452 households, the most populous in its rural district.
