= KAHU =

Kahu or KAHU may refer to:

- KAHU (FM), a radio station (91.3 FM) licensed to serve Pahala, Hawaii, United States
- KIPA (AM), a radio station (1060 AM) licensed to serve Hilo, Hawaii, which held the call sign KAHU from 1984 to 2003
- HMNZS Kahu (A04), a Moa class inshore patrol vessel of the Royal New Zealand Navy
- HMNZS Kahu (P3571), a Fairmile B motor launch of the Royal New Zealand Navy
- Project Kahu, an upgrade for the A-4 Skyhawk fighter jet
- Swamp harrier, a bird that is also known by the Māori-language name kāhu

== Places ==
- Kahu, Chenaran, Razavi Khorasan Province, Iran
- Kahu, Dargaz, Razavi Khorasan Province, Iran
- Kähu, a village in Tõrva Parish, Valga County, Estonia
