= Tarqi =

Tarqi may refer to:

- Tarki, Russia
- Tarqi, North Khorasan, Iran
- Tarqi, Razavi Khorasan, Iran
