= Sanqoz-e Bala =

Sanqoz-e Bala سنقزبالا
- Village
- Location within Iran
- Coordinates: 37°05′56″N 59°12′11″E
- Country: Iran
- Province: Razavi Khorasan
- County: Dargaz
- Bakhsh: Chapeshlu
- Rural District: Miankuh

Population (2006)
  - Total: 28
- Time zone: UTC+3:30 (IRST)
  - Summer (DST): UTC+4:30 (IRDT)

Sanqoz-e Bala (Persian: سنقزبالا, also Romanized as Sanqoz-e Bālā; also known as Sanqor-e Bālā) is a village in Miankuh Rural District, Chapeshlu District, Dargaz County, Razavi Khorasan Province, Iran. At the 2006 census, its population was 28, in 6 families.
