= Naqab, North Khorasan =

Village in North Khorasan province, Iran

Naqab Persian: نقاب
- Village
- Location within Iran
- Coordinates: 37°14′57″N 58°20′27″E
- Country: Iran
- Province: North Khorasan
- County: Faruj
- District: Khabushan
- Rural District: Titkanlu

Population (2016)
  - Total: 441
- Time zone: UTC+3:30 (IRST)

Naqab (Persian: نقاب) (Note: Also romanized as Naqāb and Neqāb; also known as Nakkob) is a village in Titkanlu Rural District (Note: Formerly Khabushan Rural District) of Khabushan District in Faruj County, North Khorasan province, Iran.

== Demographics ==
=== Population ===
At the time of the 2006 National Census, the village's population was 532 in 145 households. The 2011 census counted 551 people in 153 households. The 2016 census measured the population of the village as 441 people in 132 households.
