= Kalateh-ye Safdarabad =

Village in North Khorasan province, Iran

Kalateh-ye Safdarabad Persian: كلاته صفدراباد
- Village
- Location within Iran
- Coordinates: 37°13′43″N 58°14′31″E
- Country: Iran
- Province: North Khorasan
- County: Faruj
- District: Khabushan
- Rural District: Titkanlu

Population (2016)
  - Total: 956
- Time zone: UTC+3:30 (IRST)

Kalateh-ye Safdarabad (Persian: كلاته صفدراباد) (Note: Also romanized as Kalāteh-ye Safdarābād) is a village in Titkanlu Rural District (Note: Formerly Khabushan Rural District) of Khabushan District in Faruj County, North Khorasan province, Iran.

== Demographics ==
=== Population ===
At the time of the 2006 National Census, the village's population was 717 in 182 households. The 2011 census counted 753 people in 235 households. The 2016 census measured the population of the village as 956 people in 297 households.
