= Tarnik =

Village in North Khorasan province, Iran

Tarnik Persian: ترنیک
- Village
- Location within Iran
- Coordinates: 37°13′52″N 58°21′18″E
- Country: Iran
- Province: North Khorasan
- County: Faruj
- District: Khabushan
- Rural District: Titkanlu

Population (2016)
  - Total: 263
- Time zone: UTC+3:30 (IRST)

Tarnik (Persian: ترنیک) (Note: Also romanized as Tarnīk) is a village in Titkanlu Rural District (Note: Formerly Khabushan Rural District) of Khabushan District in Faruj County, North Khorasan province, Iran.

== Demographics ==
=== Population ===
At the time of the 2006 National Census, the village's population was 237 in 72 households. The 2011 census counted 325 people in 102 households. The 2016 census measured the population of the village as 263 people in 80 households.
