= Qaleh-ye Safa =

Village in North Khorasan province, Iran

Qaleh-ye Safa Persian: قلعه صفا
- Village
- Location within Iran
- Coordinates: 37°26′08″N 58°14′34″E
- Country: Iran
- Province: North Khorasan
- County: Faruj
- District: Khabushan
- Rural District: Hesar

Population (2016)
  - Total: 291
- Time zone: UTC+3:30 (IRST)

Qaleh-ye Safa (Persian: قلعه صفا) (Note: Also romanized as Qal‘eh-ye Şafā; also known as Şafā) is a village in Hesar Rural District of Khabushan District in Faruj County, North Khorasan province, Iran.

== Demographics ==
=== Population ===
At the time of the 2006 National Census, the village's population was 420 in 112 households. The following census in 2011 counted 394 people in 108 households. The 2016 census measured the population of the village as 291 people in 99 households.
