= Esfejir =

Village in North Khorasan province, Iran

Esfejir Persian: اسفجير
- Village
- Location within Iran
- Coordinates: 37°23′21″N 58°18′18″E
- Country: Iran
- Province: North Khorasan
- County: Faruj
- District: Khabushan
- Rural District: Hesar

Population (2016)
  - Total: 629
- Time zone: UTC+3:30 (IRST)

Esfejir (Persian: اسفجير) (Note: Also romanized as Esfejīr) is a village in Hesar Rural District of Khabushan District in Faruj County, North Khorasan province, Iran.

== Demographics ==
=== Population ===
At the time of the 2006 National Census, the village's population was 896 in 239 households. The following census in 2011 counted 817 people in 247 households. The 2016 census measured the population of the village as 629 people in 193 households.
