= Mir Fazlollah =

Village in North Khorasan province, Iran

Mir Fazlollah Persian: ميرفضل اله
- Village
- Location within Iran
- Coordinates: 37°13′53″N 58°19′09″E
- Country: Iran
- Province: North Khorasan
- County: Faruj
- District: Khabushan
- Rural District: Titkanlu

Population (2016)
  - Total: 167
- Time zone: UTC+3:30 (IRST)

Mir Fazlollah (Persian: ميرفضل اله) (Note: Also romanized as Mīr Faẕlollāh and Mīr Fazlollāh; also known as Mīr Feyẕollāh) is a village in Titkanlu Rural District (Note: Formerly Khabushan Rural District) of Khabushan District in Faruj County, North Khorasan province, Iran.

== Demographics ==
=== Population ===
At the time of the 2006 National Census, the village's population was 109 in 28 households. The 2011 census counted 114 people in 31 households. The 2016 census measured the population of the village as 167 people in 49 households.
