= Chaqar, Razavi Khorasan =

Village in Razavi Khorasan province, Iran

Chaqar Persian: چقر
- Village
- Location within Iran
- Coordinates: 37°28′02″N 59°09′13″E
- Country: Iran
- Province: Razavi Khorasan
- County: Dargaz
- District: Central
- Rural District: Takab

Population (2016)
  - Total: 560
- Time zone: UTC+3:30 (IRST)

Chaqar (Persian: چقر) is a village in Takab Rural District of the Central District in Dargaz County, Razavi Khorasan province, Iran.

== Demographics ==
=== Population ===
At the time of the 2006 National Census, the village's population was 602 in 150 households. The following census in 2011 counted 624 people in 159 households. The 2016 census measured the population of the village as 560 people in 119 households.
