= Gaz Kuh =

Village in North Khorasan province, Iran

Gaz Kuh Persian: گزكوه
- Village
- Location within Iran
- Coordinates: 37°14′39″N 58°23′13″E
- Country: Iran
- Province: North Khorasan
- County: Faruj
- District: Khabushan
- Rural District: Titkanlu

Population (2016)
  - Total: 968
- Time zone: UTC+3:30 (IRST)

Gaz Kuh (Persian: گزكوه) (Note: Also romanized as Gaz Kūh) is a village in Titkanlu Rural District (Note: Formerly Khabushan Rural District) of Khabushan District in Faruj County, North Khorasan province, Iran.

== Demographics ==
=== Population ===
At the time of the 2006 National Census, the village's population was 1,063 in 297 households. The 2011 census counted 1,070 people in 316 households. The 2016 census measured the population of the village as 968 people in 286 households, the most populous in its rural district.
