= Hesar Andaf =

Village in North Khorasan province, Iran

Hesar Andaf Persian: حصاراندف
- Village
- Location within Iran
- Coordinates: 37°20′55″N 58°15′51″E
- Country: Iran
- Province: North Khorasan
- County: Faruj
- District: Khabushan
- Rural District: Hesar

Population (2016)
  - Total: 625
- Time zone: UTC+3:30 (IRST)

Hesar Andaf (Persian: حصاراندف) (Note: Also romanized as Ḩeşār Āndaf, Ḩeşārandaf, and Ḩeşār-e Āndaf; also known as Ḩeşār and Hisār) is a village in, and the capital of, Hesar Rural District in Khabushan District of Faruj County, North Khorasan province, Iran.

== Demographics ==
=== Population ===
At the time of the 2006 National Census, the village's population was 487 in 141 households. The following census in 2011 counted 582 people in 178 households. The 2016 census measured the population of the village as 625 people in 199 households.
