= Kahu, Dargaz =

Village in Razavi Khorasan province, Iran

Kahu Persian: كاهو
- Village
- Location within Iran
- Coordinates: 37°27′52″N 58°56′24″E
- Country: Iran
- Province: Razavi Khorasan
- County: Dargaz
- District: Central
- Rural District: Takab

Population (2016)
  - Total: 483
- Time zone: UTC+3:30 (IRST)

Kahu (Persian: كاهو) (Note: Also romanized as Kāhū) is a village in Takab Rural District of the Central District in Dargaz County, Razavi Khorasan province, Iran.

== Demographics ==
=== Population ===
At the time of the 2006 National Census, the village's population was 639 in 186 households. The following census in 2011 counted 544 people in 189 households. The 2016 census measured the population of the village as 483 people in 180 households.
