= Marghzar, Faruj =

Village in North Khorasan province, Iran

Marghzar Persian: مرغزار
- Village
- Location within Iran
- Coordinates: 37°12′44″N 58°18′09″E
- Country: Iran
- Province: North Khorasan
- County: Faruj
- District: Khabushan
- Rural District: Titkanlu

Population (2016)
  - Total: 531
- Time zone: UTC+3:30 (IRST)

Marghzar (Persian: مرغزار) (Note: Also romanized as Marghzār and Morghzār) is a village in Titkanlu Rural District (Note: Formerly Khabushan Rural District) of Khabushan District in Faruj County, North Khorasan province, Iran.

== Demographics ==
=== Population ===
At the time of the 2006 National Census, the village's population was 645 in 192 households. The 2011 census counted 584 people in 188 households. The 2016 census measured the population of the village as 531 people in 179 households.
