= Ghaffarabad, Razavi Khorasan =

Village in Razavi Khorasan province, Iran

Ghaffarabad Persian: غفاراباد
- Village
- Location within Iran
- Coordinates: 37°28′54″N 59°20′25″E
- Country: Iran
- Province: Razavi Khorasan
- County: Dargaz
- District: Lotfabad
- Rural District: Dibaj

Population (2016)
  - Total: 116
- Time zone: UTC+3:30 (IRST)

Ghaffarabad (Persian: غفاراباد) (Note: Also romanized as Ghaffārābād) is a village in Dibaj Rural District of Lotfabad District in Dargaz County, Razavi Khorasan province, Iran.

== Demographics ==
=== Population ===
At the time of the 2006 National Census, the village's population was 182 in 49 households. The following census in 2011 counted 140 people in 42 households. The 2016 census measured the population of the village as 116 people in 44 households.
