= Kuran-e Kordiyeh =

Village in North Khorasan province, Iran

Kuran-e Kordiyeh Persian: كوران كرديه
- Village
- Location within Iran
- Coordinates: 37°23′10″N 58°16′36″E
- Country: Iran
- Province: North Khorasan
- County: Faruj
- District: Khabushan
- Rural District: Hesar

Population (2016)
  - Total: 431
- Time zone: UTC+3:30 (IRST)

Kuran-e Kordiyeh (Persian: كوران كرديه) (Note: Also romanized as Kūrān-e Kordīyeh; also known as Kūrān, Kūrān Korvīyeh, and Kūrār Korvīyeh) is a village in Hesar Rural District of Khabushan District in Faruj County, North Khorasan province, Iran.

== Demographics ==
=== Population ===
At the time of the 2006 National Census, the village's population was 585 in 141 households. The following census in 2011 counted 473 people in 147 households. The 2016 census measured the population of the village as 431 people in 130 households.
