= Khvajehha =

Village in North Khorasan province, Iran

Khvajehha Persian: خواجه ها
- Village
- Location within Iran
- Coordinates: 37°17′58″N 58°17′09″E
- Country: Iran
- Province: North Khorasan
- County: Faruj
- District: Khabushan
- Rural District: Hesar

Population (2016)
  - Total: 203
- Time zone: UTC+3:30 (IRST)

Khvajehha (Persian: خواجه ها) (Note: Also romanized as Khvājehhā) is a village in Hesar Rural District of Khabushan District in Faruj County, North Khorasan province, Iran.

== Demographics ==
=== Population ===
At the time of the 2006 National Census, the village's population was 190 in 58 households. The following census in 2011 counted 217 people in 70 households. The 2016 census measured the population of the village as 203 people in 64 households.
