= Aq Bagh =

Village in North Khorasan province, Iran

Aq Bagh Persian: اق باغ
- Village
- Location within Iran
- Coordinates: 37°20′22″N 58°16′54″E
- Country: Iran
- Province: North Khorasan
- County: Faruj
- District: Khabushan
- Rural District: Hesar

Population (2016)
  - Total: Below reporting threshold
- Time zone: UTC+3:30 (IRST)

Aq Bagh (Persian: اق باغ) (Note: Also romanized as Āq Bāgh) is a village in Hesar Rural District of Khabushan District in Faruj County, North Khorasan province, Iran.

== Demographics ==
=== Population ===
At the time of the 2006 National Census, the village's population was 20 in seven households. The village did not appear in the following census of 2011. The 2016 census measured the population of the village as below the reporting threshold.
