= Kalateh-ye Jafarabad =

Village in North Khorasan province, Iran

Kalateh-ye Jafarabad Persian: كلاته جعفراباد
- Village
- Location within Iran
- Coordinates: 37°13′17″N 58°15′31″E
- Country: Iran
- Province: North Khorasan
- County: Faruj
- District: Khabushan
- Rural District: Titkanlu

Population (2016)
  - Total: 285
- Time zone: UTC+3:30 (IRST)

Kalateh-ye Jafarabad (Persian: كلاته جعفراباد) (Note: Also romanized as Kalāteh-ye Ja‘farābād) is a village in Titkanlu Rural District (Note: Formerly Khabushan Rural District) of Khabushan District in Faruj County, North Khorasan province, Iran.

== Demographics ==
=== Population ===
At the time of the 2006 National Census, the village's population was 337 in 92 households. The 2011 census counted 311 people in 96 households. The 2016 census measured the population of the village as 285 people in 91 households.
