= Sanqoz-e Pain =

Sanqoz-e Pain سنقز پایین
- Village
- Location within Iran
- Coordinates: 37°06′52″N 59°11′03″E
- Country: Iran
- Province: Razavi Khorasan
- County: Dargaz
- Bakhsh: Chapeshlu
- Rural District: Miankuh

Population (2006)
  - Total: 42
- Time zone: UTC+3:30 (IRST)
  - Summer (DST): UTC+4:30 (IRDT)

Sanqoz-e Pain (Persian: سنقز پایین, also Romanized as Sanqoz-e Pā’īn; also known as Sanqor-e Pā’īn) is a village in the Miankuh Rural District, Chapeshlu District, Dargaz County, Razavi Khorasan Province, Iran. At the 2006 census, the population was 42, in 10 families.
