= Najafabad, Faruj =

Village in North Khorasan province, Iran

Najafabad Persian: نجف‌آباد
- Village
- Location within Iran
- Coordinates: 37°17′34″N 58°13′30″E
- Country: Iran
- Province: North Khorasan
- County: Faruj
- District: Khabushan
- Rural District: Titkanlu

Population (2016)
  - Total: 669
- Time zone: UTC+3:30 (IRST)

Najafabad (Persian: نجف اباد) (Note: Also romanized as Najafābād and Nejafābād) is a village in Titkanlu Rural District (Note: Formerly Khabushan Rural District) of Khabushan District in Faruj County, North Khorasan province, Iran.

== Demographics ==
=== Population ===
At the time of the 2006 National Census, the village's population was 732 in 231 households. The 2011 census counted 669 people in 237 households. The 2016 census measured the population of the village as 669 people in 237 households.
