= Darband-e Zard =

Darband-e Zard (Persian: دربندزرد), also rendered as Darvand-e Zard, may refer to:

- Darband-e Zard-e Olya
- Darband-e Zard-e Sofla
