= Titkanlu Rural District =

Rural district in North Khorasan province, Iran

Titkanlu Rural District Persian: دهستان تيتكانلو
- Rural District
- Location within Iran
- Coordinates: 37°14′N 58°17′E
- Country: Iran
- Province: North Khorasan
- County: Faruj
- District: Khabushan
- Established: 1987
- Capital: Titkanlu

Population (2016)
  - Total: 5,877
- Time zone: UTC+3:30 (IRST)

Titkanlu Rural District (Persian: دهستان تيتكانلو) (Note: Formerly Khabushan Rural District (دهستان خبوشان)) is in Khabushan District of Faruj County, North Khorasan province, Iran. It is administered from the city of Titkanlu.

== Demographics ==
=== Population ===
At the time of the 2006 National Census, the rural district's population was 9,858 in 2,658 households. There were 6,176 inhabitants in 1,856 households at the following census of 2011. The 2016 census measured the population of the rural district as 5,877 in 1,862 households. The most populous of its 15 villages was Gaz Kuh, with 968 people.

=== Other villages in the rural district ===
- Hajji Taqi
- Jafarabad-e Sofla
- Kalateh-ye Jafarabad
- Kalateh-ye Safdarabad
- Marghzar
- Mir Fazlollah
- Najafabad
- Naqab
- Tarnik
- Valiabad
