= Darband-e Sofla =

Darband-e Sofla (Persian: دربندي سفلي) may refer to:

- Darband-e Sofla, Dargaz
- Darband-e Sofla, Sarakhs
