= Darbandi-ye Sofla, Dargaz =

Village in Razavi Khorasan province, Iran

Darbandi-ye Sofla Persian: دربندي سفلي
- Village
- Location within Iran
- Coordinates: 37°14′28″N 58°52′56″E
- Country: Iran
- Province: Razavi Khorasan
- County: Dargaz
- District: Chapeshlu
- Rural District: Miankuh

Population (2016)
  - Total: 238
- Time zone: UTC+3:30 (IRST)

Darbandi-ye Sofla (Persian: دربندي سفلي) (Note: Also romanized as Darbandī-ye Soflá; also known as Darband-e Pā’īn, Darband-e Sofla, and Darband-e Soflá) is a village in Miankuh Rural District of Chapeshlu District in Dargaz County, Razavi Khorasan province, Iran.

== Demographics ==
=== Population ===
At the time of the 2006 National Census, the village's population was 280 in 96 households. The following census in 2011 counted 262 people in 96 households. The 2016 census measured the population of the village as 238 people in 89 households.
