= Darband-e Olya =

Darband-e Olya (Persian: دربندعليا) may refer to:

- Darband-e Olya, Dargaz
- Darband-e Olya, Sarakhs
