= Dargaz =

City in Razavi Khorasan Province, Iran

Dargaz Persian: درگز Darreh Gaz
- City
- Location within Iran
- Coordinates: 37°26′33″N 59°06′26″E
- Country: Iran
- Province: Razavi Khorasan
- County: Dargaz
- District: Central
- Elevation: 479 m (1,572 ft)

Population (2016)
  - Total: 36,762
- Time zone: UTC+3:30 (IRST)
- Area code: +985146
- Website: daregaz.khorasan.ir

Dargaz (Persian: درگز) (Note: Also romanized as Dar Gaz; also known as Darreh Gaz; formerly Moḩammadābād, Moḩammadābād Arbāb, or Muhammadābād) is a city in the Central District of Dargaz County, Razavi Khorasan Province, Iran, serving as capital of both the county and the district.

== History ==
For the period before the advent of the Safavids (r. 1501–1722), the historic city of Abivard was one of the educational centers of Islamic and Arabic scholarship in eastern Iran. Under the Saljuqids, Muhammad born Ahmad al-Abivardi (died 1114), was one of the renowned poets and litterateurs who, later in his life, settled for a while in Baghdad, but on the account of his Shi'ite proclivities was persecuted by the Abbasids. He then attended the court of the Saljuq Sultan Muhammad and was appointed to the position of Chief Accountant of the court. Another contemporary famous name from Abivard is Ali born Muhammad Anvari-Abivardi (died c. 1191), one of the great classical poets of Iran. After the Mongol invasion of Iran and Iraq, Husam al-Din Abivardi (died after 1324) is mentioned as one of the theologians attending the court of the Abbasid caliphs of Egypt. Nader Shah was Also born in the City, In The Fort of Dargaz.

== Demographics ==
=== Population ===
At the time of the 2006 National Census, the city's population was 34,305 in 9,196 households. The following census in 2011 counted 37,054 people in 18,618 households. The 2016 census measured the population of the city as 36,762 people in 11,448 households.

== Geography ==
The city of Dargaz is 1,150 kilometres (710 mi) from Tehran and 255 kilometres (158 mi) from the center of Khorasan province. It is bound by Turkmenistan from the north, Mashhad from the east and southeast, Chanaran from the south, and Qoochan from the west. Dargaz, which was previously known as Abivard, is in a region among the most ancient centers of Iranian culture.

Climate map of Iran. Dargaz is located in the Mediterranean region with spring rain.

Dargaz is in the Mediterranean region with spring rain. The city is 123 km from Quchan and 258 km from Mashhad. Its altitude is 480 meters above sea level.

== Archaeology ==
Excavations in this mountainous site have revealed artifacts dating back as far as the Parthian and Sasanian periods, and pre-historic times. Numerous mounds and other ancient sites have also yielded much evidence of the site's rich historical and cultural inheritance. Throughout its history, the site has been known by a variety of names: Dara, Daragyard, Pavart in pre-Islamic Persia, and Bavard, Abivard after the Islamic expansion. With its rich bazaar and access to fertile lands, the city was considerably more prosperous than neighboring Nesa and was widely known as one of the largest and most affluent cities of the Great Khorasan area.

- Media related to Dargaz at Wikimedia Commons
