= Dibaj Rural District =

Rural district in Razavi Khorasan province, Iran

Dibaj Rural District Persian: دهستان ديباج
- Rural District
- Location within Iran
- Coordinates: 37°26′N 59°18′E
- Country: Iran
- Province: Razavi Khorasan
- County: Dargaz
- District: Lotfabad
- Established: 1987
- Capital: Shiligan

Population (2016)
  - Total: 3,045
- Time zone: UTC+3:30 (IRST)

Dibaj Rural District (Persian: دهستان ديباج) is in Lotfabad District of Dargaz County, Razavi Khorasan province, Iran. Its capital is the village of Shiligan.

== Demographics ==
=== Population ===
At the time of the 2006 National Census, the rural district's population was 3,297 in 913 households. There were 3,313 inhabitants in 1,001 households at the following census of 2011. The 2016 census measured the population of the rural district as 3,045 in 992 households. The most populous of its 13 villages was Hatam Qaleh, with 825 people.

=== Other villages in the rural district ===
- Ghaffarabad
- Hesar
- Kheyrabad-e Sofla
- Mir Qaleh
- Qazqan Darreh
- Qorbanabad
- Sefar Qaleh
- Towqi
- Yaqul
