= Titkanlu =

City in North Khorasan province, Iran

Titkanlu Persian: تيتكانلو
- City
- Location within Iran
- Coordinates: 37°16′50″N 58°17′19″E
- Country: Iran
- Province: North Khorasan
- County: Faruj
- District: Khabushan
- Established as a city: 2009

Population (2016)
  - Total: 3,835
- Time zone: UTC+3:30 (IRST)

Titkanlu (Persian: تيتكانلو) (Note: Also romanized as Tītkānlū; also known as Tatīgānlū, Tīkānlū, and Tītgānlū) is a city in, and the capital of, Khabushan District in Faruj County, North Khorasan province, Iran. It also serves as the administrative center for Titkanlu Rural District. (Note: Formerly Khabushan Rural District)

== Demographics ==
=== Population ===
At the time of the 2006 National Census, Titkanlu's population was 3,630 in 950 households, when it was a village in Titkanlu Rural District. The following census in 2011 counted 3,827 people in 1,118 households, by which time the village had been converted to a city. The 2016 census measured the population of Titkanlu as 3,835 people in 1,198 households.
