= Tarqi-ye Sofla =

Village in North Khorasan province, Iran

Tarqi-ye Sofla Persian: طرقي سفلي
- Village
- Location within Iran
- Coordinates: 37°22′04″N 58°15′12″E
- Country: Iran
- Province: North Khorasan
- County: Faruj
- District: Khabushan
- Rural District: Hesar

Population (2016)
  - Total: 141
- Time zone: UTC+3:30 (IRST)

Tarqi-ye Sofla (Persian: طرقي سفلي) (Note: Also romanized as Tarqī-ye Soflá; also known as Ţaroqī, Tarqey, and Tarqī) is a village in Hesar Rural District of Khabushan District in Faruj County, North Khorasan province, Iran.

== Demographics ==
=== Population ===
At the time of the 2006 National Census, the village's population was 170 in 43 households. The following census in 2011 counted 131 people in 40 households. The 2016 census measured the population of the village as 141 people in 41 households.
