= Zangelanlu Rural District =

Rural district in Razavi Khorasan province, Iran

Zangelanlu Rural District Persian: دهستان زنگلانلو
- Rural District
- Location within Iran
- Coordinates: 37°13′N 59°19′E
- Country: Iran
- Province: Razavi Khorasan
- County: Dargaz
- District: Lotfabad
- Established: 2003
- Capital: Shams Khan

Population (2016)
  - Total: 4,522
- Time zone: UTC+3:30 (IRST)

Zangelanlu Rural District (Persian: دهستان زنگلانلو) is in Lotfabad District of Dargaz County, Razavi Khorasan province, Iran. Its capital is the village of Shams Khan.

== Demographics ==
=== Population ===
At the time of the 2006 National Census, the rural district's population was 5,180 in 1,226 households. There were 4,910 inhabitants in 1,406 households at the following census of 2011. The 2016 census measured the population of the rural district as 4,522 in 1361 households. The most populous of its 10 villages was Tirgan, with 1,138 people.

=== Other villages in the rural district ===
- Dowlatabad
- Kalateh-ye Khalilabad
- Kalateh-ye Tut
- Moradabad
- Pol-e Gerd
- Qazan-e Beyk
- Yekkeh Bagh
- Zangelanlu
