= Tahmuras of Shirvan =

Tahmuras
- Commander of Shirvanshah army
- Full name: Amir Tahmuras ibn Sheikh Bahlul Darbandi
- Died: 5 April 1459 or 4 May 1459; Near Samur river
- Buried: Baku
- Noble family: House of Shirvanshah
- Father: Bahlul of Shirvan
- Mother: ?
- Occupation: General

Amir Tahmuras Darbandi (Persian: امیر طهمورث دربندی) was a member of House of Shirvanshah, ruling dynasty of Shirvan. He was a great-grandson of Shirvanshah Keykubad I and cousin of Khalilullah I.

== Life ==
The exact date of his birth is not known. He was appointed as chief commander of Shirvan army after the death of his father. He was killed near Samur river while battling with forces of Junayd Safavi. He was buried in Shirvanshahs' Palace. His gravestone has especially remarkable ornaments with inscription on it:

This illimunated grave and purifying afterlife place, the most holy sepulchre belongs to son of Sheikh Bahlul (may Allah have mercy on him), who is deceased, who is forgiven of sins, who is a martyr that earned Allah's mercy, sublime, genius, magnanimous, greatest amir, generous and courageous, lord of all of the worlds commanders - Amir Tahmuras. Hijri 863, Jumada al-Thani. (5 April - 4 May 1459)

== See also ==
- Darbandi (disambiguation)
