= Chapeshlu =

City in Razavi Khorasan province, Iran

Chapeshlu Persian: چاپشلو
- City
- Location within Iran
- Coordinates: 37°21′03″N 59°04′40″E
- Country: Iran
- Province: Razavi Khorasan
- County: Dargaz
- District: Chapeshlu
- Established as a city: 1995

Population (2016)
  - Total: 2,374
- Time zone: UTC+3:30 (IRST)

Chapeshlu (Persian: چاپشلو) (Note: Also romanized as Chāpeshlū; also known as Chāpishlu; formerly Chāvosh and Chowveshlī) is a city in, and the capital of, Chapeshlu District of Dargaz County, Razavi Khorasan province, Iran. It also serves as the administrative center for Qarah Bashlu Rural District. The village of Chapeshlu was converted to a city in 1995.

== Demographics ==
=== Population ===
At the time of the 2006 National Census, the city's population was 2,247 in 616 households. The following census in 2011 counted 2,474 people in 734 households. The 2016 census measured the population of the city as 2,374 people in 769 households.
