= Hesar Rural District =

Rural district in North Khorasan province, Iran

Hesar Rural District Persian: دهستان حصار
- Rural District
- Location within Iran
- Coordinates: 37°28′N 58°18′E
- Country: Iran
- Province: North Khorasan
- County: Faruj
- District: Khabushan
- Established: 2004
- Capital: Hesar Andaf

Population (2016)
  - Total: 4,957
- Time zone: UTC+3:30 (IRST)

Hesar Rural District (Persian: دهستان حصار) is in Khabushan District of Faruj County, North Khorasan province, Iran. Its capital is the village of Hesar Andaf.

== Demographics ==
=== Population ===
At the time of the 2006 National Census, the rural district's population was 5,476 in 1,508 households. There were 5,228 inhabitants in 1,654 households at the following census of 2011. The 2016 census measured the population of the rural district as 4,957 in 1,623 households. The most populous of its 17 villages was Yam, with 1,328 people.

=== Other villages in the rural district ===
- Aq Bagh
- Darband-e Esfejir
- Esfejir
- Khabushan
- Khvajehha
- Kuran-e Kordiyeh
- Kuran-e Torkiyeh
- Qaleh-ye Safa
- Tarqi-ye Sofla
