= Darbandi-ye Olya, Dargaz =

Village in Razavi Khorasan province, Iran

Darbandi-ye Olya Persian: دربندي عليا
- Village
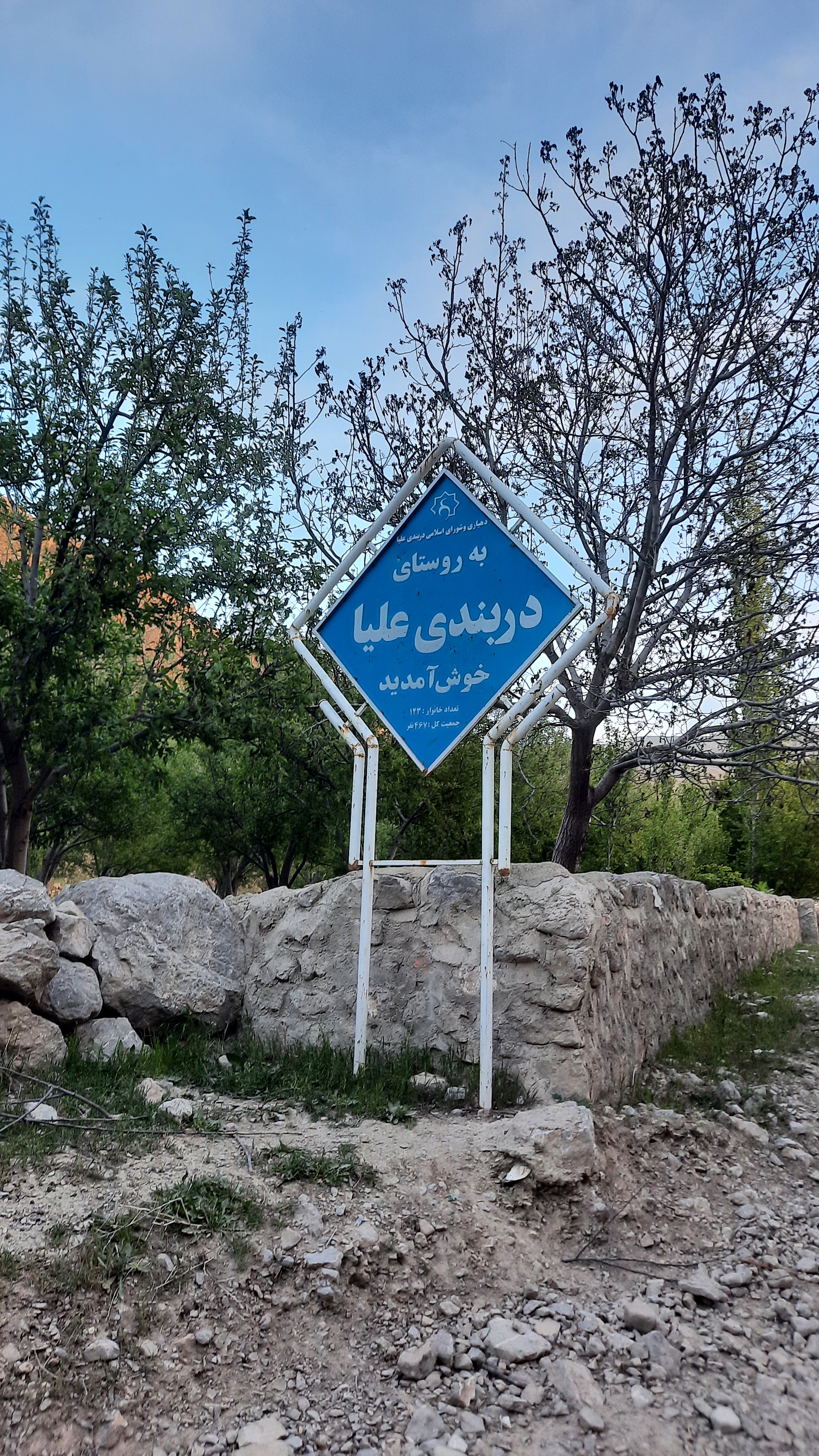
- Entrance sign to the village of Darbandi-ye Olya

- Location within Iran
- Coordinates: 37°13′47″N 58°51′15″E
- Country: Iran
- Province: Razavi Khorasan
- County: Dargaz
- District: Chapeshlu
- Rural District: Miankuh

Population (2016)
  - Total: 463
- Time zone: UTC+3:30 (IRST)

Darbandi-ye Olya (Persian: دربندي عليا) (Note: Also romanized as Darbandī-ye ‘Olyā; also known as Darband-e Bālā, Darband-e Olya, Darband-e ‘Olyā, Qeshlaq Darbandi (قشلاق دربندئ), and Qeshlāq-e Darband) is a village in Miankuh Rural District of Chapeshlu District in Dargaz County, Razavi Khorasan province, Iran.

== Demographics ==
=== Population ===
At the time of the 2006 National Census, the village's population was 599 in 128 households. The following census in 2011 counted 467 people in 128 households. The 2016 census measured the population of the village as 463 people in 145 households.
