= Bahlul =

Bahlul may refer to:

== People ==
- Bahlūl, companion of Imam Musa al-Kadhim
- Bahlul of Shirvan, member of the House of Shirvanshah, the ruling dynasty of Shirvan
- Ali al-Bahlul (born 1969), US Guantanamo Bay detainee
- Bahlul Ibn Marzuq (died 802), Basque rebel under Moorish rule
- Bahlul Khan Lodi (died 1489), Delhi sultan, founder of Lodi Dynasty
- Bahlul Mustafazade, an Azerbaijani footballer
- Ḥasan bar Bahlul, a 10th-century Christian bishop and Syriac linguist

== Places ==
- Bahlul, Azerbaijan, a village near the city of Stepanakert, de facto part of the self-proclaimed Republic of Artsakh, de jure in Azerbaijan
- Bahlul, Yemen, a village in west-central Yemen
