= Lotfabad =

City in Razavi Khorasan province, Iran

Lotfabad Persian: لطف آباد
- City
- Location within Iran
- Coordinates: 37°31′05″N 59°20′26″E
- Country: Iran
- Province: Razavi Khorasan
- County: Dargaz
- District: Lotfabad

Population (2016)
  - Total: 1,865
- Time zone: UTC+3:30 (IRST)

Lotfabad (Persian: لطف آباد) (Note: Also romanized as Loţfābād; also known as Lutfābād; formerly Bāba Jām) is a city in, and the capital of, Lotfabad District of Dargaz County, Razavi Khorasan province, Iran. On the Iran-Turkmenistan border, it is the site of an official crossing point to Turkmenistan.

== Demographics ==
=== Population ===
At the time of the 2006 National Census, the city's population was 1,897 in 570 households. The following census in 2011 counted 1,790 people in 540 households. The 2016 census measured the population of the city as 1,865 people in 605 households.

== Notable people ==
- Abbas Bagheri Lotfabad, Iranian ophthalmologist, academic, and researcher
