= Darband, Astara =

Darband دربند
- Village
- Location within Iran
- Coordinates: 38°21′48″N 48°50′29″E
- Country: Iran
- Province: Gilan
- County: Astara
- Bakhsh: Central
- Rural District: Virmuni

Population (2016)
  - Total: 334
- Time zone: UTC+3:30 (IRST)

Darband (Persian: دربند) is a village in Virmuni Rural District, in the Central District of Astara County, Gilan Province, Iran. At the 2006 census, its population was 427. In 2016, it had 334 people in 106 households.
