= Darband Zard =

Village in Kermanshah, Iran

Darband Zard دربندزرد
- Village
- Location within Iran
- Coordinates: 34°13′54″N 47°03′16″E
- Country: Iran
- Province: Kermanshah
- County: Kermanshah
- Bakhsh: Firuzabad
- Rural District: Sar Firuzabad

Population (2006)
  - Total: 28
- Time zone: UTC+3:30 (IRST)
  - Summer (DST): UTC+4:30 (IRDT)

Darband Zard (Persian: دربندزرد) is a village in Sar Firuzabad Rural District, Firuzabad District, Kermanshah County, Kermanshah Province, Iran. At the 2006 census, its population was 28, in 9 families.
