= Darabad, Afghanistan =

- Location in Afghanistan
- Coordinates: 36°57′1″N 66°55′38″E
- Country: Afghanistan
- Province: Balkh Province
- Time zone: + 4.30

Darabad is a village in Balkh Province in northern Afghanistan.
