= Darband Khizan =

Darband Khizan دربندخيزان
- Village
- Location within Iran
- Coordinates: 34°00′18″N 46°13′18″E
- Country: Iran
- Province: Kermanshah
- County: Gilan-e Gharb
- Bakhsh: Central
- Rural District: Cheleh

Population (2006)
  - Total: 56
- Time zone: UTC+3:30 (IRST)
  - Summer (DST): UTC+4:30 (IRDT)

Darband Khizan (Persian: دربندخيزان, also Romanized as Darband Khīzān; also known as Darreh Khīzān-e 'Olyā) is a village in Cheleh Rural District, in the Central District of Gilan-e Gharb County, Kermanshah province, Iran. According to the 2006 census, the village had a population of 56, distributed among nine families.
