= Darvand, Harsin =

Darvand داروند
- Village
- Location within Iran
- Coordinates: 34°30′27″N 47°18′58″E
- Country: Iran
- Province: Kermanshah
- County: Harsin
- Bakhsh: Bisotun
- Rural District: Cham Chamal

Population (2006)
  - Total: 102
- Time zone: UTC+3:30 (IRST)
  - Summer (DST): UTC+4:30 (IRDT)

Darvand (Persian: داروند, also Romanized as Dārvand) is a village in Cham Chamal Rural District, Bisotun District, Harsin County, Kermanshah Province, Iran. At the 2006 census, its population was 102, in 20 families.
