= Derbent (disambiguation) =

Derbent is a city in the Republic of Dagestan, Russia.

Derbent may also refer to:

== Places ==
=== Russia ===
- Derbent Urban Okrug, a municipal formation which the City of Derbent in the Republic of Dagestan, Russia is incorporated as
- Derbent Khanate, a historical khanate centered in the city of Derbent,

=== Turkey ===
- Derbent, Bartın, a village in the Bartın Province
- Derbent, Bismil, a village in the Diyarbakır Province
- Derbent, Bayat, a village in the Afyonkarahisar Province
- Derbent, Buldan, a village in the Denizli Province
- Derbent, Konya, a district center and town in the Konya Province
- Derbent Dam, a dam on the Kızılırmak River in Samsun Province

=== Elsewhere ===
- Derventa, a town and municipality of Bosnia and Herzegovina

== Other uses ==
- FC Derbent, a defunct association football club from Derbent, Russia
- Tanker "Derbent", a novel by Yury Krymov, made into a Soviet movie

== See also ==
- Derbentsky District, a district in the Republic of Dagestan, Russia
- Derbentobruğu, Gümüşhacıköy, a village in the Amasya Province, Turkey
- Derbendcis, Ottoman military auxiliary constabulary units
- Iron Gate (Central Asia), a defile between Balkh and Samarkand
