= Darband-e Esfejir =

Village in North Khorasan province, Iran

Darband-e Esfejir Persian: دربنداسفجير
- Village
- Location within Iran
- Coordinates: 37°21′45″N 58°16′40″E
- Country: Iran
- Province: North Khorasan
- County: Faruj
- District: Khabushan
- Rural District: Hesar

Population (2016)
  - Total: 194
- Time zone: UTC+3:30 (IRST)

Darband-e Esfejir (Persian: دربنداسفجير) (Note: Also romanized as Darband Esfajir, Darband Esfajīr, Darband Esfejir, Darband Esfejīr, Darband-e Esfajīr, and Darband-e Esfejīr; also known as Darband-e Esfenjīr and Darbandī) is a village in Hesar Rural District of Khabushan District in Faruj County, North Khorasan province, Iran.

== Demographics ==
=== Population ===
At the time of the 2006 National Census, the village's population was 214 in 63 households. The following census in 2011 counted 202 people in 72 households. The 2016 census measured the population of the village as 194 people in 68 households.
