= Darband, Kech =

Darband
- Location within Pakistan
- Coordinates: 26.19°N 62.40°E
- Country: Pakistan
- Province: Balochistan
- District: Kech
- Elevation: 710 m (2,330 ft)
- Time zone: UTC+5 (PST)

Darband is a human settlement in Kech District in Balochistan province of Pakistan. It is located at 26°19'0N 62°40'0E It is close to the Pakistani border with Iran.
