= Darband-e Aziz =

Darband-e Aziz دربندعزيز
- Village
- Location within Iran
- Coordinates: 34°53′00″N 47°02′49″E
- Country: Iran
- Province: Kurdistan
- County: Kamyaran
- Bakhsh: Central
- Rural District: Bilavar

Population (2006)
  - Total: 65
- Time zone: UTC+3:30 (IRST)
  - Summer (DST): UTC+4:30 (IRDT)

Darband-e Aziz (Persian: دربندعزيز, also Romanized as Darband-e ‘Azīz) is a village in Bilavar Rural District, in the Central District of Kamyaran County, Kurdistan Province, Iran. At the 2006 census, its population was 65, in 13 families. The village is populated by Kurds.
