= Karmrakar =

Karmrakar Կարմրաքար
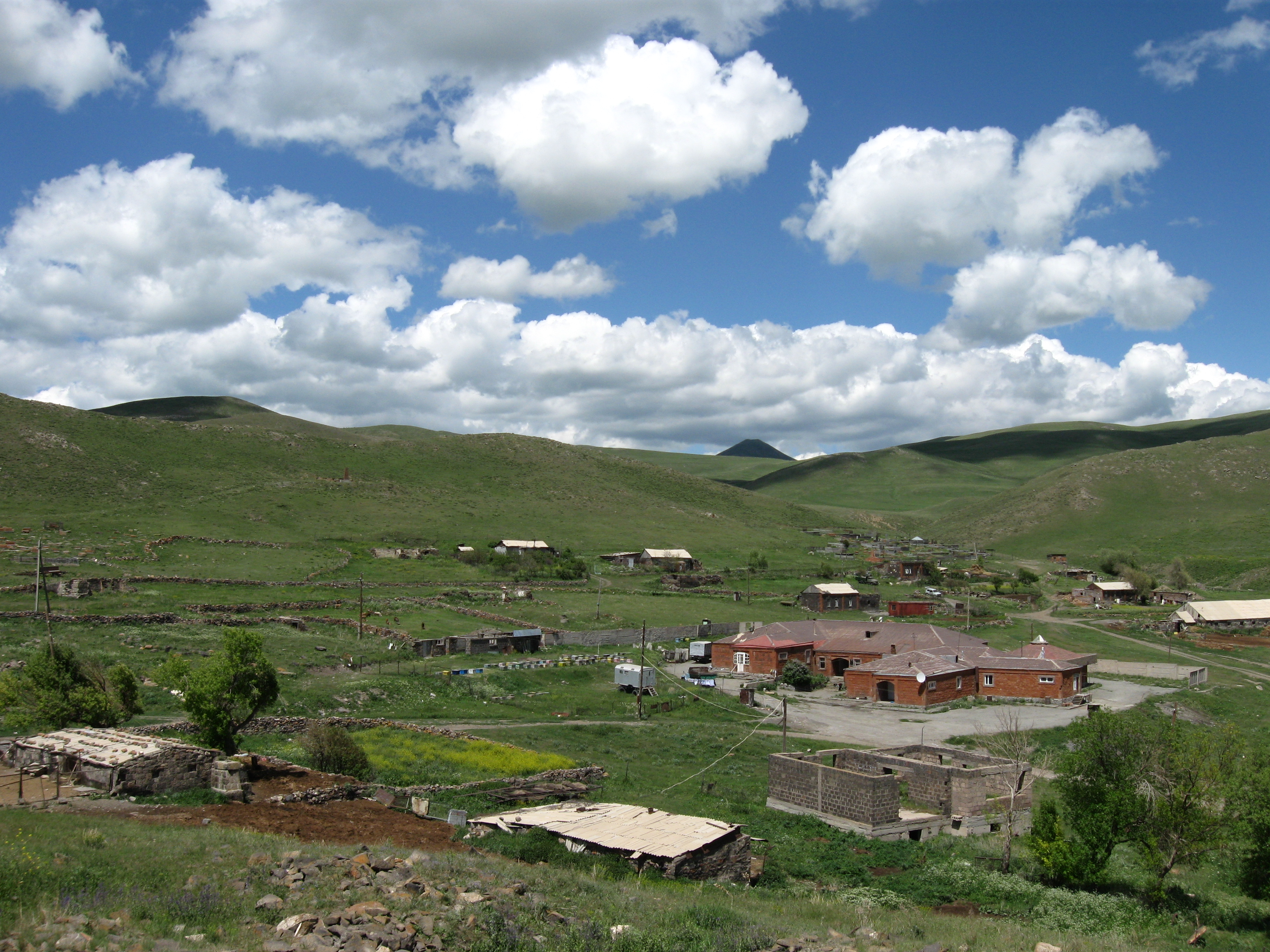

- Location within Armenia Location within Shirak
- Coordinates: 40°52′N 43°53′E
- Country: Armenia
- Province: Shirak
- Municipality: Akhuryan

Population (2011)
  - Total: 47
- Time zone: UTC+4
  - Summer (DST): UTC+5

Karmrakar (Armenian: Կարմրաքար) is a village in the Akhuryan Municipality of the Shirak Province of Armenia.

Village mayor: Artur Matevosyan

== Demographics ==
Historical population
Year	Pop.	±% p.a.
1831	162	—
1897	388	+1.33%
1926	236	−1.70%
1939	364	+3.39%
1959	285	−1.22%
1970	131	−6.82%
1979	50	−10.15%
1989	34	−3.78%
2001	52	+3.60%
2011	47	−1.01%
