= Darvand-e Sartang =

Darvand-e Sartang داروندسرتنگ
- Village
- Location within Iran
- Coordinates: 33°54′25″N 46°09′40″E
- Country: Iran
- Province: Ilam
- County: Eyvan
- Bakhsh: Zarneh
- Rural District: Kalan

Population (2006)
  - Total: 298
- Time zone: UTC+3:30 (IRST)
  - Summer (DST): UTC+4:30 (IRDT)

Darvand-e Sartang (Persian: داروندسرتنگ, also Romanized as Dārvand-e Sartang; also known as Sar Tang and Sar Tang-e ‘Olyā) is a village in Kalan Rural District, Zarneh District, Eyvan County, Ilam Province, Iran. At the 2006 census, its population was 298, in 65 families. The village is populated by Kurds.
