= Ghaffarabad, Kerman =

Ghaffarabad غفاراباد
- Village
- Location within Iran
- Coordinates: 29°51′36″N 56°31′12″E
- Country: Iran
- Province: Kerman
- County: Bardsir
- Bakhsh: Central
- Rural District: Mashiz

Population (2006)
  - Total: 43
- Time zone: UTC+3:30 (IRST)
  - Summer (DST): UTC+4:30 (IRDT)

Ghaffarabad (Persian: غفاراباد, also Romanized as Ghaffārābād) is a village in Mashiz Rural District, in the Central District of Bardsir County, Kerman Province, Iran. At the 2006 census, its population was 43, in 10 families.
