= Darband-e Kamalvand =

Darband-e Kamalvand دربند کمالوند
- Village
- Location within Iran
- Coordinates: 33°26′38″N 48°26′56″E
- Country: Iran
- Province: Lorestan
- County: Khorramabad
- Bakhsh: Central
- Rural District: Dehpir

Population (2006)
  - Total: 361
- Time zone: UTC+3:30 (IRST)
  - Summer (DST): UTC+4:30 (IRDT)

Darband-e Kamalvand (Persian: دربند کمالوند, also Romanized as Darband-e Kamālvand; also known as Darband and Darband-e Faqīrān) is a village in Dehpir Rural District, in the Central District of Khorramabad County, Lorestan Province, Iran. At the 2006 census, its population was 361, in 76 families.
