= Asad Khan, Khuzestan =

Asad Khan اسدخان
- Village
- Location within Iran
- Coordinates: 31°41′08″N 48°34′15″E
- Country: Iran
- Province: Khuzestan
- County: Ahvaz
- Bakhsh: Central
- Rural District: Elhayi

Population (2006)
  - Total: 102
- Time zone: UTC+3:30 (IRST)
  - Summer (DST): UTC+4:30 (IRDT)

Asad Khan (Persian: اسدخان, also Romanized as Asad Khān) is a village in Elhayi Rural District, in the Central District of Ahvaz County, Khuzestan Province, Iran. At the 2006 census, its population was 102, in 17 families.
