= Darban-e Salah =

Darban-e Salah دربن صلاح
- Village
- Location within Iran
- Coordinates: 26°51′25″N 57°54′23″E
- Country: Iran
- Province: Hormozgan
- County: Bashagard
- Bakhsh: Gowharan
- Rural District: Gowharan

Population (2006)
  - Total: 35
- Time zone: UTC+3:30 (IRST)
  - Summer (DST): UTC+4:30 (IRDT)

Darban-e Salah (Persian: دربن صلاح, also Romanized as Darban-e Şalāḩ; also known as Darband Şalāḩ) is a village in Gowharan Rural District, Gowharan District, Bashagard County, Hormozgan Province, Iran. At the 2006 census, its population was 35, in 7 families.
