= Fazel Darbandi =

Fazel Darbandi (Persian: فاضل دربندی), also Fadil al-Darbandi (Arabic: فاضل الدربندي), also known as Molla Agha Darbandi (Note: Alternatively spelled as Mulla Aqa Darbandi.) (Persian: ملا آقا دربندی) (died 1869/1870, Tehran), was an Iranian Shia cleric and scholar of the Qajar era.

== Biography ==
Darbandi's surname implies an origin in the city of Darband (i.e. Derbent, now part of Dagestan, Russia), or its environs, although the exact whereabouts of his place and date of birth are unknown. Darbandi grew up to study in Najaf, in Ottoman Iraq, where he was a student of Molla Mohammad Sharif-ol-Olama Mazandarani (died 1829–1830).

Darbandi later tried to teach in the city of Karbala, but the "peculiarities" of his persona made it "impossible" to retain any number of students. Afterwards, he moved to Iran, arriving in Tehran where prime minister (ṣadr-e aʿẓam) Mirza Aqa Khan Nuri had just been dismissed.

Darbandi was famous amongst his contemporaries for being eloquent in both Persian as well as Arabic, as well as for "erudition" in the science related to "Hadith transmitters". After his death, he was buried in Karbala.

== Sources ==
- Algar, Hamid (1994). "DARBANDĪ, MULLA ĀQĀ". In Yarshater, Ehsan (ed.). Encyclopædia Iranica. Vol. VII/1: Dārā(b)–Dastūr al-Afāżel. London and New York: Routledge & Kegan Paul. ISBN 978-1-56859-019-6.
