= Darband, Qazvin =

Darband دربند
- Village
- Location within Iran
- Coordinates: 36°34′50″N 50°14′51″E
- Country: Iran
- Province: Qazvin
- County: Qazvin
- Bakhsh: Alamut-e Gharbi
- Rural District: Rudbar-e Shahrestan

Population (2006)
  - Total: 139
- Time zone: UTC+3:30 (IRST)
  - Summer (DST): UTC+4:30 (IRDT)

Darband (Persian: دربند) is a village in Rudbar-e Shahrestan Rural District, Alamut-e Gharbi District, Qazvin County, Qazvin Province, Iran. At the 2006 census, its population was 139, in 34 families.
