= Darband-e Gharbi =

Darband-e Gharbi دربندغربي
- Village
- Location within Iran
- Coordinates: 30°26′52″N 48°08′38″E
- Country: Iran
- Province: Khuzestan
- County: Khorramshahr
- Bakhsh: Central
- Rural District: Howmeh-ye Gharbi

Population (2006)
  - Total: 1,364
- Time zone: UTC+3:30 (IRST)
  - Summer (DST): UTC+4:30 (IRDT)

Darband-e Gharbi (Persian: دربندغربي, also Romanized as Darband-e Gharbī and Darband Gharbi; also known as Darband, Darband Sharghi, Dorband-e Gharbī, Dorband-e Shargī, and Dowrband-e Gharbī) is a village in Howmeh-ye Gharbi Rural District, in the Central District of Khorramshahr County, Khuzestan Province, Iran. At the 2006 census, its population was 1,364, in 276 families.
