= Darband-e Zard-e Olya =

Darband-e Zard-e Olya دربندزردعليا
- Village
- Location within Iran
- Coordinates: 34°42′23″N 45°44′56″E
- Country: Iran
- Province: Kermanshah
- County: Salas-e Babajani
- Bakhsh: Ozgoleh
- Rural District: Sarqaleh

Population (2006)
  - Total: 35
- Time zone: UTC+3:30 (IRST)
  - Summer (DST): UTC+4:30 (IRDT)

Darband-e Zard-e Olya (Persian: دربندزردعليا, also romanized as Dārband-e Zard-e 'Olyā; also known as Darband-e Zard and Dārvand-e Zard) is a village in Sarqaleh Rural District, Ozgoleh District, Salas-e Babajani County, Kermanshah province, Iran. At the 2006 census, its population was 35, in seven families.
