= Miankuh Rural District (Dargaz County) =

Rural district in Razavi Khorasan province, Iran

Miankuh Rural District Persian: دهستان ميانكوه
- Rural District
- Location within Iran
- Coordinates: 37°09′N 59°02′E
- Country: Iran
- Province: Razavi Khorasan
- County: Dargaz
- District: Chapeshlu
- Established: 1987
- Capital: Kapkan

Population (2016)
  - Total: 4,089
- Time zone: UTC+3:30 (IRST)

Miankuh Rural District (Persian: دهستان ميانكوه) is in Chapeshlu District of Dargaz County, Razavi Khorasan province, Iran. Its capital is the village of Kapkan.

== Demographics ==
=== Population ===
At the time of the 2006 National Census, the rural district's population was 4,409 in 1,117 households. There were 3,888 inhabitants in 1,123 households at the following census of 2011. The 2016 census measured the population of the rural district as 4,089 in 1,213 households. The most populous of its 23 villages was Meyab, with 735 people.

=== Other villages in the rural district ===
- Darbandi-ye Olya
- Darbandi-ye Sofla
- Dehesht-e Olya
- Do Abi-ye Olya
- Hesar
- Khadem Anlu
