= Qarah Bashlu Rural District =

Rural district in Razavi Khorasan province, Iran

Qarah Bashlu Rural District Persian: دهستان قره باشلو
- Rural District
- Location within Iran
- Coordinates: 37°17′N 59°02′E
- Country: Iran
- Province: Razavi Khorasan
- County: Dargaz
- District: Chapeshlu
- Established: 1987
- Capital: Chapeshlu

Population (2016)
  - Total: 4,897
- Time zone: UTC+3:30 (IRST)

Qarah Bashlu Rural District (Persian: دهستان قره باشلو) is in Chapeshlu District of Dargaz County, Razavi Khorasan province, Iran. It is administered from the city of Chapeshlu.

== Demographics ==
=== Population ===
At the time of the 2006 National Census, the rural district's population was 5,118 in 1,212 households. There were 4,745 inhabitants in 1,413 households at the following census of 2011. The 2016 census measured the population of the rural district as 4,897 in 1,529 households. The most populous of its 34 villages was Besharat, with 502 people.

=== Other villages in the rural district ===
- Daghdar
- Hasanabad
- Ilanjiq
- Parkand
- Sadat
- Yengi Qaleh
