= Takab Rural District (Dargaz County) =

Rural district in Razavi Khorasan province, Iran

Takab Rural District Persian: دهستان تكاب
- Rural District
- Location within Iran
- Coordinates: 37°26′N 58°58′E
- Country: Iran
- Province: Razavi Khorasan
- County: Dargaz
- District: Central
- Capital: Khakhian

Population (2016)
  - Total: 5,046
- Time zone: UTC+3:30 (IRST)

Takab Rural District (Persian: دهستان تكاب) is in the Central District of Dargaz County, Razavi Khorasan province, Iran. Its capital is the village of Khakhian.

== Demographics ==
=== Population ===
At the time of the 2006 National Census, the rural district's population was 5,892 in 1,627 households. There were 5,533 inhabitants in 1,687 households at the following census of 2011. The 2016 census measured the population of the rural district as 5,046 in 1,657 households. The most populous of its 38 villages was Taj ol Din, with 1,084 people.

=== Other villages in the rural district ===
- Artian
- Chaqar
- Gol Khandan
- Kahu
- Qareh Quyunlu
- Sadabad
