= Lotfabad District =

District in Razavi Khorasan province, Iran

Lotfabad District Persian: بخش لطف‌آباد
- District
- Location within Iran
- Coordinates: 37°18′N 59°18′E
- Country: Iran
- Province: Razavi Khorasan
- County: Dargaz
- Capital: Lotfabad

Population (2016)
  - Total: 9,432
- Time zone: UTC+3:30 (IRST)

Lotfabad District (Persian: بخش لطف‌آباد) is in Dargaz County, Razavi Khorasan province, Iran. Its capital is the city of Lotfabad.

== Demographics ==
=== Population ===
At the time of the 2006 National Census, the district's population was 10,374 in 2,709 households. The following census in 2011 counted 10,013 people in 2,947 households. The 2016 census measured the population of the district as 9,432 inhabitants in 2,958 households.

=== Administrative divisions ===
Lotfabad District Population
| Administrative Divisions | 2006 | 2011 | 2016 |
|---|---|---|---|
| Dibaj RD | 3,297 | 3,313 | 3,045 |
| Zangelanlu RD | 5,180 | 4,910 | 4,522 |
| Lotfabad (city) | 1,897 | 1,790 | 1,865 |
| Total | 10,374 | 10,013 | 9,432 |
RD = Rural District
