= Khabushan District =

District in North Khorasan province, Iran

Khabushan District Persian: بخش خبوشان
- District
- Location within Iran
- Coordinates: 37°25′N 58°17′E
- Country: Iran
- Province: North Khorasan
- County: Faruj
- Established: 2004
- Capital: Titkanlu

Population (2016)
  - Total: 14,669
- Time zone: UTC+3:30 (IRST)

Khabushan District (Persian: بخش خبوشان) is in Faruj County, North Khorasan province, Iran. Its capital is the city of Titkanlu.

== History ==
The village of Titkanlu was converted to a city in 2009.

== Demographics ==
=== Population ===
At the 2006 National Census, the district's population was 15,334 in 4,166 households. The population was 15,231 people in 4,628 households during the following census in 2011. There were 14,669 people in 4,683 households in the district at the time of the 2016 census.

=== Administrative divisions ===
Khabushan District Population
Administrative Divisions	2006	2011	2016
Hesar RD	5,476	5,228	4,957
Titkanlu RD (Note: Formerly Khabushan Rural District)	9,858	6,176	5,877
Titkanlu (city)		3,827	3,835
Total	15,334	15,231	14,669
RD = Rural District
