= Central District (Dargaz County) =

District in Razavi Khorasan province, Iran

Central District (Dargaz County) Persian: بخش مرکزی شهرستان درگز
- District
- Location within Iran
- Coordinates: 37°26′N 58°58′E
- Country: Iran
- Province: Razavi Khorasan
- County: Dargaz
- Capital: Dargaz

Population (2016)
  - Total: 41,808
- Time zone: UTC+3:30 (IRST)

The Central District of Dargaz County (Persian: بخش مرکزی شهرستان درگز) is in Razavi Khorasan province, Iran. Its capital is the city of Dargaz.

== Demographics ==
=== Population ===
At the time of the 2006 National Census, the district's population was 40,197 in 10,823 households. The following census in 2011 counted 42,587 people in 12,305 households. The 2016 census measured the population of the district as 41,808 inhabitants in 13,105 households.

=== Administrative divisions ===
Central District (Dargaz County) Population
Administrative Divisions	2006	2011	2016
Takab RD	5,892	5,533	5,046
Dargaz (city)	34,305	37,054	36,762
Total	40,197	42,587	41,808
RD = Rural District
