= Chapeshlu District =

District in Razavi Khorasan province, Iran

Chapeshlu District Persian: بخش چاپشلو
- District
- Location within Iran
- Coordinates: 37°12′N 59°02′E
- Country: Iran
- Province: Razavi Khorasan
- County: Dargaz
- Capital: Chapeshlu

Population (2016)
  - Total: 11,360
- Time zone: UTC+3:30 (IRST)

Chapeshlu District (Persian: بخش چاپشلو) is in Dargaz County, Razavi Khorasan province, Iran. Its capital is the city of Chapeshlu.

== Demographics ==
=== Population ===
At the time of the 2006 National Census, the district's population was 11,774 in 2,945 households. The following census in 2011 counted 11,107 people in 3,270 households. The 2016 census measured the population of the district as 11,360 inhabitants in 3,511 households.

=== Administrative divisions ===
Chapeshlu District Population
Administrative Divisions	2006	2011	2016
Miankuh RD	4,409	3,888	4,089
Qarah Bashlu RD	5,118	4,745	4,897
Chapeshlu (city)	2,247	2,474	2,374
Total	11,774	11,107	11,360
RD = Rural District
