= Dargaz County =

County in Razavi Khorasan Province, Iran

Dargaz County Persian: شهرستان درگز
- County
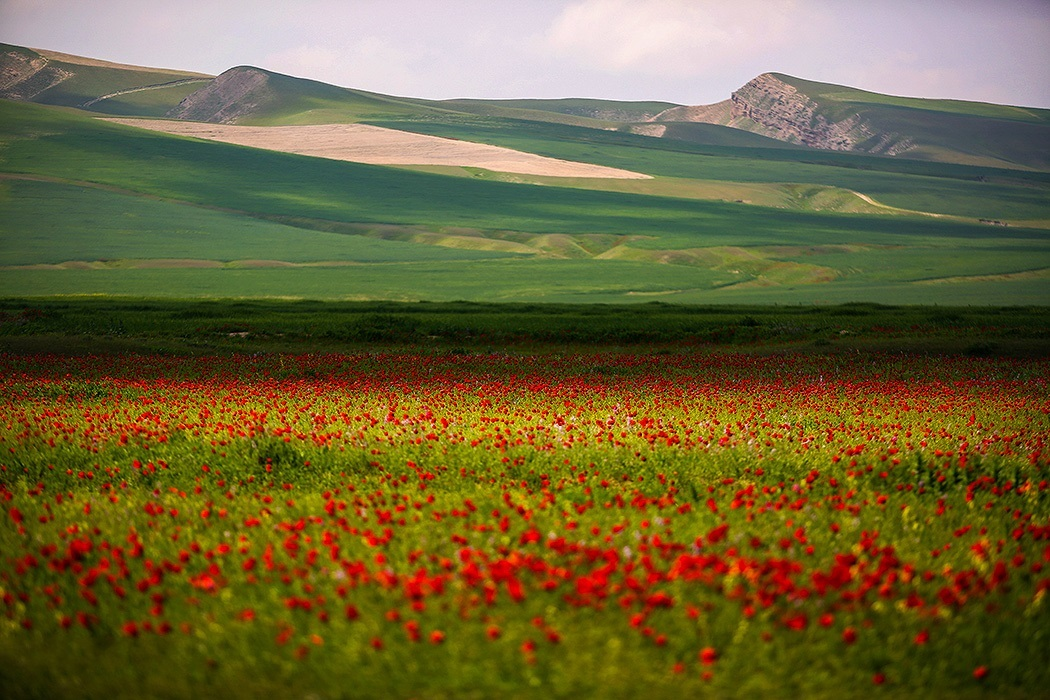
- Shilgan Darreh landscape in Dargaz County

- Location of Dargaz County in Razavi Khorasan province (top, pink)

- Location of Razavi Khorasan province in Iran
- Coordinates: 37°20′N 58°58′E
- Country: Iran
- Province: Razavi Khorasan
- Capital: Dargaz
- Districts: Central, Chapeshlu, Lotfabad, Now Khandan

Area
  - Total: 3,777 km^{2} (1,458 sq mi)

Population (2016)
  - Total: 72,355
  - Density: 19.16/km^{2} (49.62/sq mi)
- Time zone: UTC+3:30 (IRST)

Dargaz County (Persian: شهرستان درگز) is in Razavi Khorasan province, Iran. Its capital is the city of Dargaz.

== Demographics ==
=== Population ===
At the time of the 2006 National Census, the county's population was 73,439 in 19,435 households. The following census in 2011 counted 74,326 people in 21,654 households. The 2016 census measured the population of the county as 72,355 in 22,778 households.

Its prestigious ancient name of Abivard (the Apavartene in the works of the ancient geographers Ptolemy and Strabo) was changed just a few years ago, believing wrongly that it is a later Arabic name. Apavarta simply meant "rosewater" in Parthian and Old Persian.

=== Administrative divisions ===
Dargaz County's population history and administrative structure over three consecutive censuses are shown in the following table.

Dargaz County Population
Administrative Divisions	2006	2011	2016
Central District	40,197	42,587	41,808
Takab RD	5,892	5,533	5,046
Dargaz (city)	34,305	37,054	36,762
Chapeshlu District	11,774	11,107	11,360
Miankuh RD	4,409	3,888	4,089
Qarah Bashlu RD	5,118	4,745	4,897
Chapeshlu (city)	2,247	2,474	2,374
Lotfabad District	10,374	10,013	9,432
Dibaj RD	3,297	3,313	3,045
Zangelanlu RD	5,180	4,910	4,522
Lotfabad (city)	1,897	1,790	1,865
Now Khandan District	11,094	10,619	9,755
Dorungar RD	3,296	2,944	2,753
Shahrestaneh RD	5,047	5,013	4,368
Now Khandan (city)	2,751	2,662	2,634
Total	73,439	74,326	72,355
RD = Rural District

== See also ==
Media related to Dargaz County at Wikimedia Commons
