= Qaraməmmədli =

Qaraməmmədli or Karamamedly or Karamamedli may refer to:

- Qaraməmmədli, Agsu, Azerbaijan
- Qaraməmmədli, Barda, Azerbaijan
- Qaraməmmədli, Fizuli, Azerbaijan
- Qaraməmmədli, Gadabay, Azerbaijan
- Qaraməmmədli, Yevlakh, Azerbaijan
