= Pirsaat =

Pirsaat may refer to:

- Pirsaat, Baku, Azerbaijan
- Pirsaat, Hajigabul, Azerbaijan
- Pirsaat, Nəvahı, Azerbaijan
- Pirsaat (river), in Azerbaijan
