= Paşalı =

Paşalı or Pashaly may refer to:

- Paşalı, Erzurum, Turkey
- Birinci Paşalı, Azerbaijan
- İkinci Paşalı, Azerbaijan
- Pashaly Treti, Azerbaijan
- Navahı, Azerbaijan
