= Alibeyli, Mersin =

Alibeyli, Mersin may refer to two villages in Mersin Province, Turkey:

- Alibeyli, Erdemli
- Alibeyli, Tarsus

== See also ==
- Alibeyli, for other places with the same name
