= Navahi (disambiguation) =

Navahi or Nəvahi or Navahı may refer to:

- Navahi, Azerbaijan
- Nəvahı, Azerbaijan
- Nəvahı (settlement), Azerbaijan
