= Alıbəyli =

Alıbəyli or Alybeyli or Alibeili may refer to:

- Alıbəyli, Agdam, Azerbaijan
- Alıbəyli, Kalbajar, Azerbaijan (formerly Tirkeşəvənd)
- Alıbəyli, Zangilan, Azerbaijan
- Alybeyli Vtoryye, Azerbaijan

== See also ==
- Əlibəyli (disambiguation)
