= Şorbaçı =

Şorbaçı may refer to:

- Şorbaçı, Hajigabul, Azerbaijan
- Şorbaçı, Jalilabad, Azerbaijan
- Shorbachy Vtoryye, Azerbaijan
