= Alibeyli =

Alibeyli (literally "place of Ali Bey"), also spelled Əlibəyli or Alibayli or Alıbəyli, is a Turkic place name and may refer to several places:

== Azerbaijan ==
- Alıbəyli, Agdam
- Alıbəyli, Zangilan
- Əlibəyli, Qakh
- Əlibəyli, Tovuz
- Əlibəyli, Zardab

== Turkey ==
- Alibeyli, Erdemli, Mersin Province
- Alibeyli, Kalecik, Ankara Province
- Alibeyli, Tarsus, Mersin Province

== See also ==
- Alibey (disambiguation)
- Alibeyce, Emirdağ, Turkish village with a similar name
