= Vtoryye =

Vtoryye may refer to:

- Alybeyli Vtoryye (also, Ashaga Alibeyli), a village in the Zangilan Rayon of Azerbaijan
- Shorbachy Vtoryye (also, Shorbanchi), a village in the Hajigabul Rayon of Azerbaijan
