= Kəsəmən =

Kəsəmən or Kesaman may refer to:

- Aşağı Kəsəmən, Azerbaijan
- Kəsəmən, Gadabay, Azerbaijan
- Kəsəmən, Samukh, Azerbaijan
- Kyasaman
