= Xıdırlı =

Xıdırlı or Khydyrly or Khidirly or Chidirly or Khidyrly may refer to:

- Xıdırlı, Agdam, Azerbaijan
- Xıdırlı, Qubadli, Azerbaijan
- Xıdırlı, Salyan, Azerbaijan
