= Şonqar =

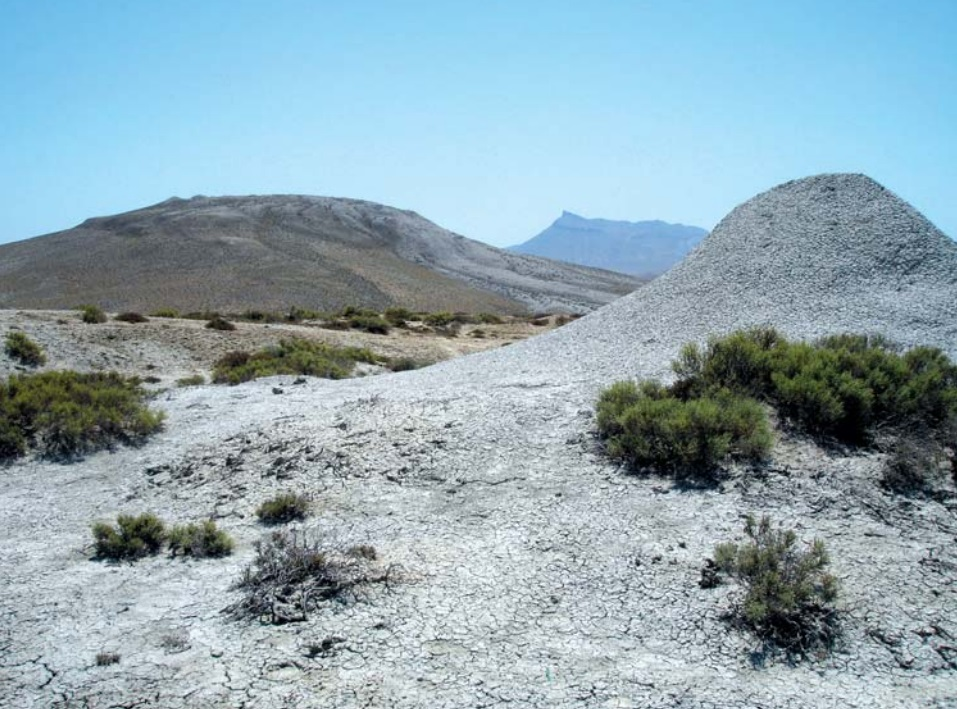

- Location within Azerbaijan
- Coordinates: 40°19′17″N 49°36′11″E
- Country: Azerbaijan
- City: Baku
- Region: Qaradağ
- Municipality: Qızıldaş

Population (2008)
  - Total: 622
- Time zone: UTC+4 (AZT)
  - Summer (DST): UTC+5 (AZT)

Şonqar (also, Shongar and Zagyar) is a settlement in Baku, Azerbaijan. The settlement forms part of the municipality of Qızıldaş in Qaradağ raion.

== Touristic Attraction ==
Shongar mud volcano, 30-40 minutes away from Baku center.
