= Qaragünə, Hajigabul =

Qaragünə
- Location within Azerbaijan
- Coordinates: 39°55′20″N 49°02′28″E
- Country: Azerbaijan
- Rayon: Hajigabul
- Time zone: UTC+4 (AZT)
  - Summer (DST): UTC+5 (AZT)

Qaragünə is a village in the Hajigabul Rayon of Azerbaijan.
