= Heybət =

- Location within Azerbaijan
- Coordinates: 40°20′19″N 49°46′31″E
- Country: Azerbaijan
- City: Baku
- Raion: Qaradağ
- Municipality: Lökbatan
- Time zone: UTC+4 (AZT)
  - Summer (DST): UTC+5 (AZT)

Heybət (also, Eibat) is a settlement in Baku, Azerbaijan. The settlement forms part of the municipality of Lökbatan in Qaradağ raion.
