= Abdulabad =

- Municipality
- Location within Azerbaijan
- Coordinates: 40°05′51″N 48°40′24″E
- Country: Azerbaijan
- Rayon: Hajigabul

Population
  - Total: 3,646
- Time zone: UTC+4 (AZT)
  - Summer (DST): UTC+5 (AZT)

Abdulabad (known as Abdulyan until 2009) is a village and municipality in the Hajigabul Rayon of Azerbaijan. It has a population of 3,423.
