= Bürvənd =

- Location within Azerbaijan
- Coordinates: 40°00′N 48°52′E
- Country: Azerbaijan
- Rayon: Hajigabul
- Municipality: Ələtli
- Time zone: UTC+4 (AZT)
  - Summer (DST): UTC+5 (AZT)

Bürvənd (also, Burvənd, Burvend, and Burvit) is a village in the Hajigabul Rayon of Azerbaijan. The village forms part of the municipality of Ələtli.
