= Kubaly =

Kubaly may refer to:

- Qubalı, Azerbaijan
- Qubalıbalaoğlan, Azerbaijan
