= Yeni Ələt =

Village in Azerbaijan

Coordinates: 39°56′28″N 49°23′17″E

Yeni Alat (Azerbaijani: Yeni Ələt) is a village in the municipality of Alat in the Garadagh raion of Baku, Azerbaijan.
