= Rostov State Transport University =

Public university in Rostov Oblast, Russia

- Ростовский государственный университет путей сообщения
- Type: Public
- Established: 1929
- President: Vladimir I. Kolesnikov
- Rector: Vladimir Vereskun
- Academic staff: 3,000
- Students: 20,000
- Location: Rostov-on-Don, Russia; 47.25083°N 39.69833°E
- Campus: Urban
- Website: www.rgups.ru/en/ Building details
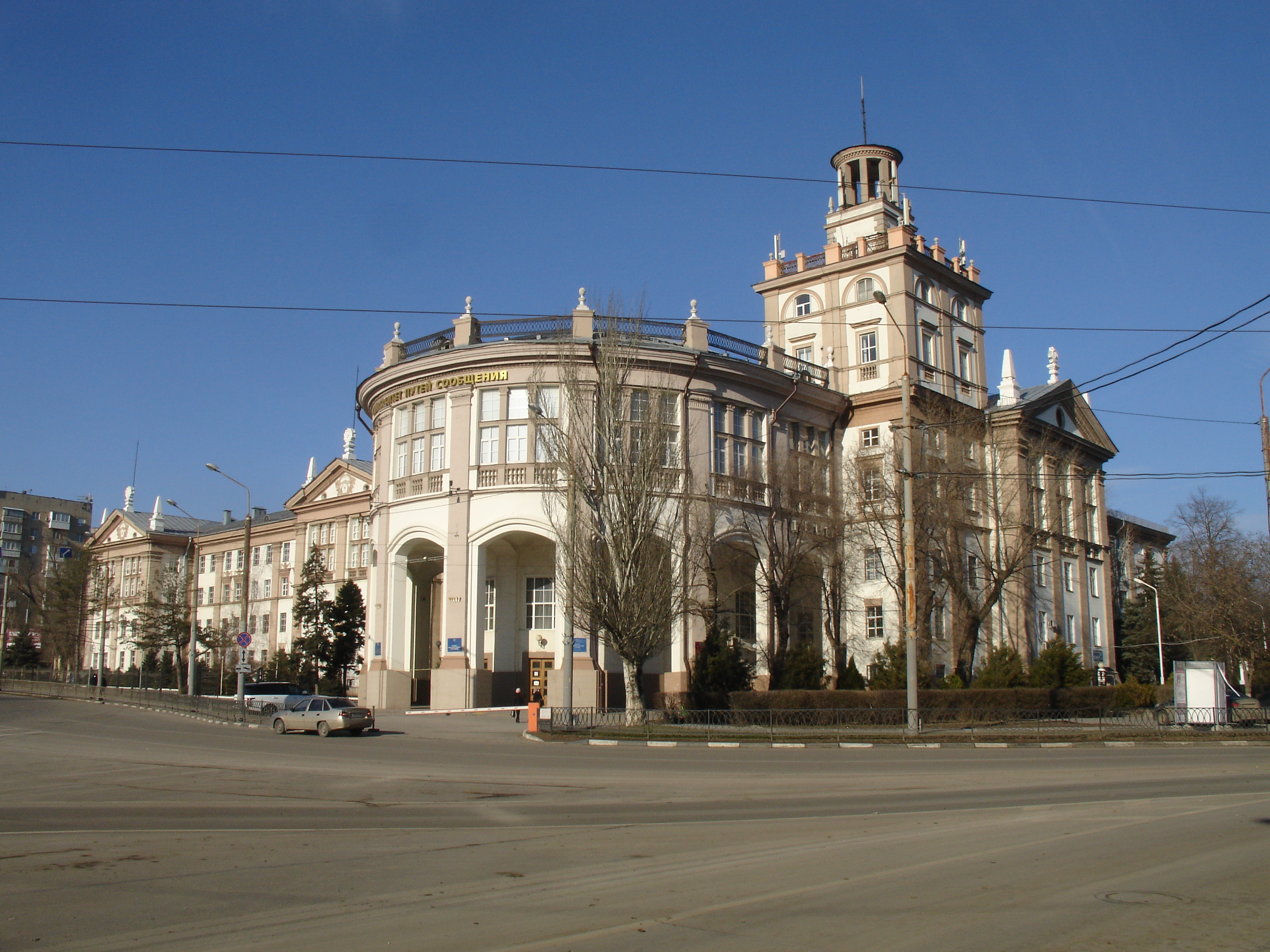

University rankings

Regional – Overall
- QS Emerging Europe and Central Asia: 251-300 (2022)

Rostov State Transport University (Russian: Ростовский государственный университет путей сообщения), abbreviated as RSTU (Russian: РГУПС) and formerly known as Rostov Institute of Railway Transport Engineers (1934–1993), is a public university in Rostov Oblast, Russia with campuses in Rostov-on-Don. Subordinate to the Ministry of Transport of the Russian Federation represented by the Federal Agency for Railway Transport and its Southern Directorate.

== History ==
Rostov State Transport University was founded on May 30, 1929 by decision of the Board of the People's Commissariat of Communication Routes of the Soviet Union. Initially it was called the “Mechanical Institute of Transport” (Russian: Механический институт транспорта), and on July 12, 1929 the institute was renamed the Rostov Institute of Railway Engineers (Russian: Ростовский институт инженеров путей сообщения).

On October 1, 1929, 292 students began classes at three faculties: Railway, Water Transport and Road Engineering. The Rostov Institute of Railway Engineers has become a southern outpost for training personnel for transport in Russia, Armenia, Azerbaijan and Georgia.

On December 29, 1934, the institute was transformed into a railway higher education institution called the Rostov Institute of Railway Transport Engineers (Russian: Ростовский институт инженеров железнодорожного транспорта). Two new faculties were created - “Locomotive”, “Wagon”. A training, laboratory and production base has been created.

During World War II, many of the institute's staff and students went to the front to defend their homeland and the world from the attack of Nazi Germany. In 1942, the institute was evacuated to Tbilisi, where it continued training specialists for railway transport and conducted scientific research. In August 1944, the Institute returned to Rostov-on-Don. During World War II, the material and technical base of the institute was almost completely destroyed. During the restoration of the institute, new faculties, departments, laboratories, offices, educational and production premises appeared.

After the end of World War II, the Soviet Union began replacing steam locomotive traction with diesel and electric ones. The institute was one of the first to begin training diesel locomotive engineers.

In 1993, the institute was renamed Rostov State Transport University (RSTU). Since 2007, the University has included: Rostov Technical School of Railway Transport, Volgograd Technical School of Railway Transport, Vladikavkaz Technical School of Railway Transport, Liskinsky Technical School of Railway Transport named after I.V. Kovalev and Tikhoretsky Technical School of Railway Transport. Since 2017, the University has included Voronezh Technical School of Railway Transport.

In 2019, the RSTU celebrated its 90th anniversary. Over the years of its existence, the university has trained more than 200 000 specialists for transport and other sectors of the country’s economy.

== Today ==
Now RSTU is a dynamically developing large transport educational complex. The university ranks high in the rankings of transport universities in Russia. The RSTU is an active participant of the social, scientific and cultural life of the Rostov Region.

== Faculties ==
- Faculty of Road Building Machines
- Faculty of Civil Engineering
- Faculty of Transportation Management
- Electromechanical Faculty
- Faculty of Power Engineering
- Faculty of Management Information Technologies
- Faculty of Humanities
- Faculty of Economics, Management and Law

== Infrastructure ==
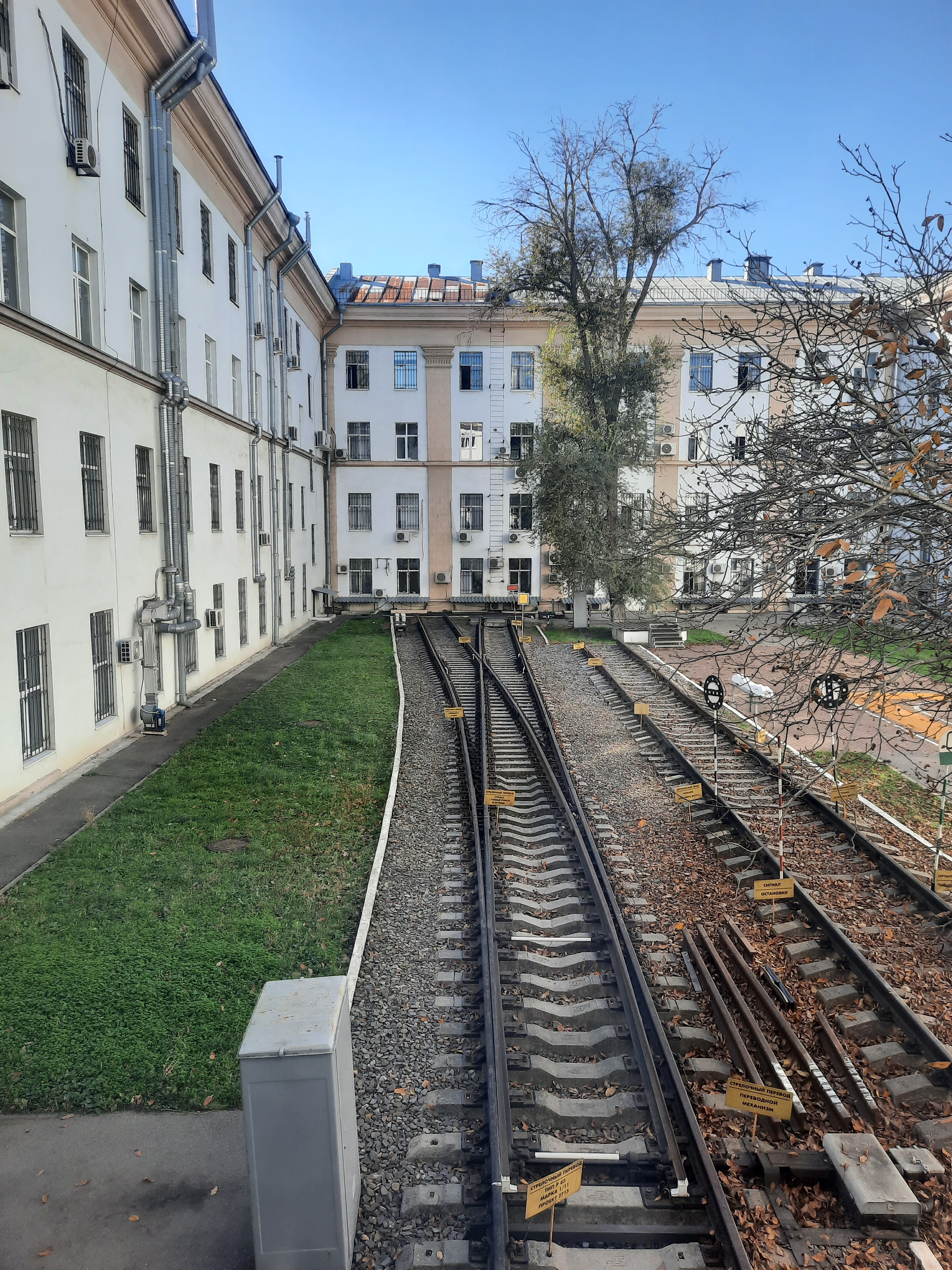
A section of the railway for practical training in the courtyard of the RSTU campus

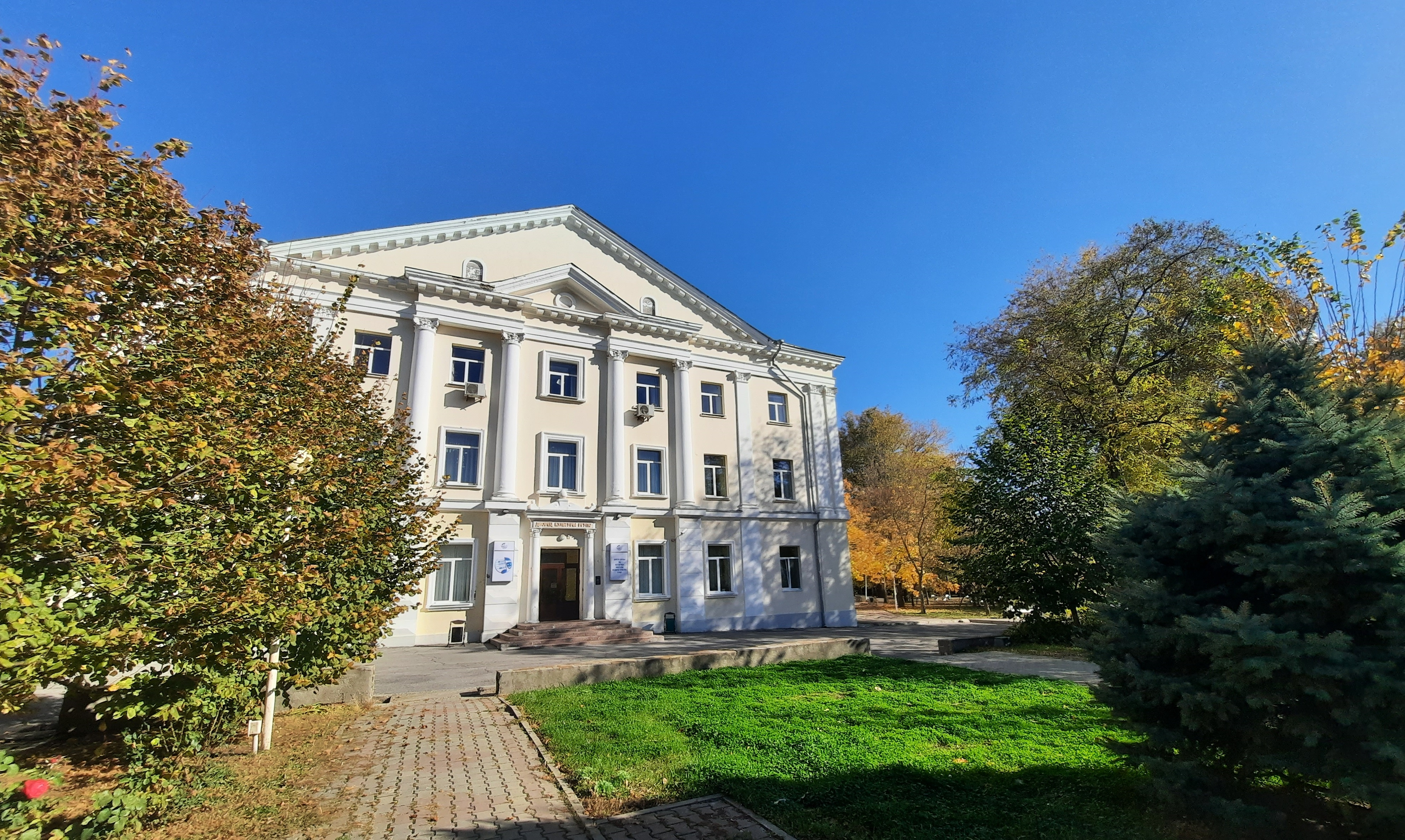
Palace of Culture, RSTU

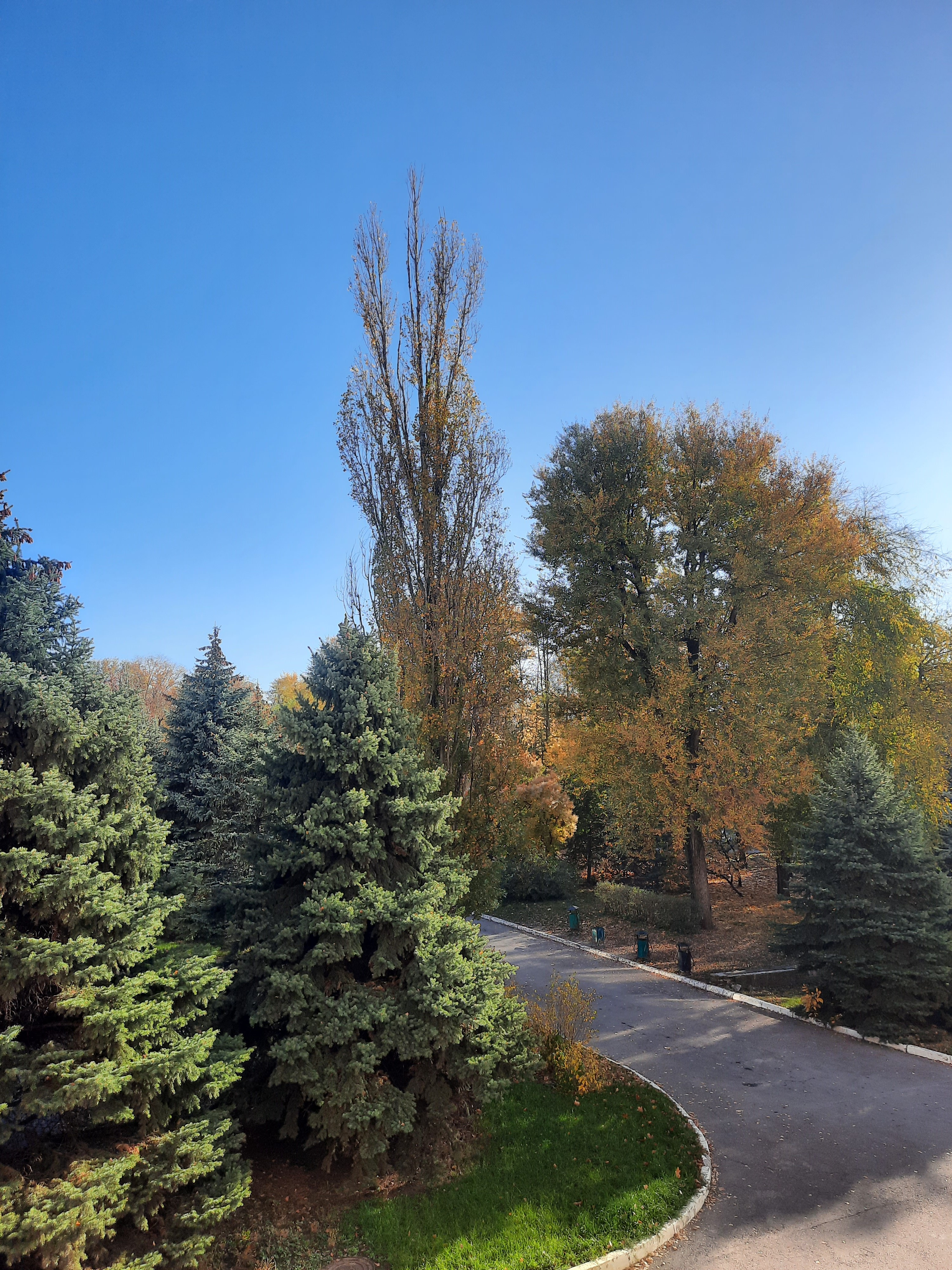
Garden Square, RSTU

The university has:

- The Students’ Town of more than 20 hectares with a garden square, a section of the railway for practical training in the courtyard, educational and research facilities
- Administration Building
- Palace of Culture, which is the center of cultural and festival activities of the university
- Consulting and Diagnostic Clinic
- 4 Student's dormitories

=== Sports infrastructure ===
- Universal sports stadium
- Mini-football field
- Swimming pool
- Games room for playing volleyball and basketball
- Hall for practicing various types of wrestling
- Weightlifting hall
- Table tennis room
- Chess Club

== Alumni ==
- Nikolay Andryushchenko, soviet track and field athlete, high jump specialist
- El'man, russian singer and musician
- Oleg Lobov, russian politician
- Oleksandr Makarov, soviet and ukrainian rocket engineer and General Director of PA Pivdenmash from 1961 to 1986
- Ziya Mammadov, Azerbaijani politician and billionaire who served as the Minister of Transportation

== See also ==
- Education in Russia
- List of universities in Russia
- Railway colleges in the Soviet Union
