= Kotal =

Coordinates: 39°59′N 49°26′E

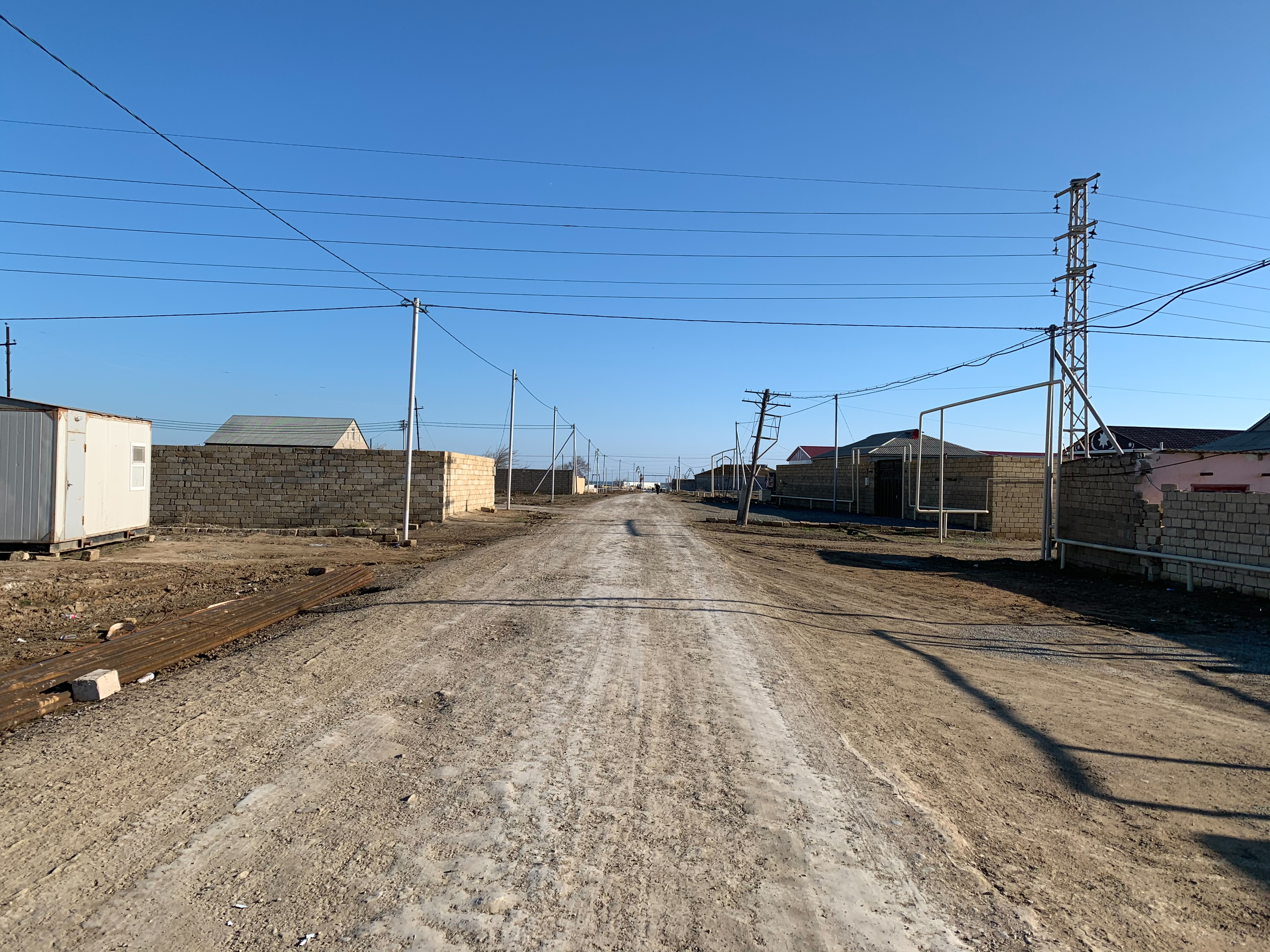
- Interactive map of Kotal

Kotal is a village in the municipality of Ələt in the Qaradağ raion of Baku, Azerbaijan.
