= Qızılburun =

- Municipality
- Location within Azerbaijan
- Coordinates: 39°59′45″N 49°13′17″E
- Country: Azerbaijan
- Rayon: Hajigabul

Population
  - Total: 1,034
- Time zone: UTC+4 (AZT)
  - Summer (DST): UTC+5 (AZT)

Qızılburun (also, Kochevka Kyzyl-Burun and Kyzylburun) is a village and municipality in the Hajigabul Rayon of Azerbaijan. It has a population of 1,034.
