= The Ritz-Carlton Baku Hotel =

Hotel and tower in Baku, Azerbaijan

- The tower in 2024

General information
- Type: Condominium; Hotel
- Architectural style: Structural Expressionism
- Location: Heydar Aliyev Prospekti, Baku, Azerbaijan
- Coordinates: 40.389455°N 49.865097°E
- Construction started: 2008
- Construction stopped: 2015
- Completed: 2022
- Owner: Baku XXI Century

Technical details
- Floor count: 33

Design and construction
- Architect: Pierre Baillargeon
- Architecture firm: Mixity Design
- Developer: Baku XXI Century
- Main contractor: Garant Holdings

The Ritz-Carlton Baku Hotel, formerly known as Trump International Hotel & Tower Baku is a 33-floor hotel and condominium tower located in the Nasimi District in Baku, Azerbaijan. Construction began in 2008, when the project was initially planned as an apartment building. The project was owned by Baku XXI Century, a company affiliated with several members of the Mammadov family, which has been described as having a reputation for corruption.

Businessman Donald Trump became involved with the unfinished project in May 2012, through his company, The Trump Organization. Trump announced his involvement with the project in November 2014, with plans to have the building opened as a hotel and condominium property in June 2015. Construction was delayed in 2015, and the project remained unfinished. After Trump announced his candidacy for U.S. president in the 2016 election, several news organizations reported on his involvement with the project, which raised questions about possible corruption involving the Mammadov family. The building eventually opened in 2022 under the Ritz-Carlton brand.

== History ==
=== Early history ===
The project was announced as an apartment building in 2008, to be built along a road named Heydar Aliyev Prospekti, in Baku, Azerbaijan. Much of the property for the new project was occupied by numerous houses. The project's original budget was $195 million, although the price increased after several design revisions. The project was initially designed by a local architect, and its original design included a rooftop resembling the spikes of a crown. Pierre Baillargeon and Mixity Design, his London-based architecture firm, redesigned the project and removed the crown-roof aspect. The structure was designed as a curved building to resemble a sail, similar to the Burj Al Arab in Dubai.

The project is owned by Baku XXI Century, a company founded by Elton Mammadov, who was a member of the Azerbaijani parliament and the brother of Azerbaijan's Transportation Minister, Ziya Mammadov. Anar Mammadov, Ziya's son, was also involved in the company and the project. Construction began in 2008, and was handled by Garant Holdings, of which Anar Mammadov was the founder and a shareholder.

In 2011, residents were informed through letters from the local government that their houses would be demolished to make room for a project that was described as being significant for the government. Thirty families were evicted from their houses. One resident received a government payment of $18,000 to compensate for her house, which she estimated was worth five times the amount of what she was paid; she sued the government after discovering that a luxury tower was being built on the property formerly occupied by the houses.

=== Trump's involvement ===
Image of tower in 2015 with Trump branding

In May 2012, businessman Donald Trump's company, The Trump Organization, signed multiple contracts with Elton and Anar Mammadov and planned to renovate the tower into an "ultra-luxury property." Trump also licensed his name to the project, which would be named as the Trump International Hotel & Tower Baku. The first 13 floors would feature hotel rooms, while the remaining floors of the 33-story tower would be used for condominiums. The hotel was to be managed by Trump's company.

Trump's daughter, Ivanka Trump, oversaw the project's overall development, while Mace, a London-based construction company, oversaw the partial conversion of the tower into a hotel. Ivanka Trump and The Trump Organization were intricately involved in approving designs to bring the project up to Trump standards. Employees of The Trump Organization made monthly visits to the site to approve each new work order on the project. Although many of the project's condominiums had been completed at the time of Donald Trump's involvement, employees of The Trump Organization had much of the building's interior gutted and rebuilt. Several elevators were also added.

Ivanka Trump toured the property in October 2014. Donald Trump publicly announced the project on November 6, 2014, with plans to open it in June 2015 as the next property in the Trump Hotel Collection. The project was to feature 72 "ultra-luxury" residences, 40 serviced apartments, 30 suites, and 119 hotel rooms. The residences would range from 84 square meters(904 sqft) to 890 square meters (9579 sqft). The residential lobby was to feature gold leaf glass, while the hotel would include a 500 square-meter ballroom, 147 meters of retail space, a champagne bar, a restaurant, and a spa with several pools.

=== Delay ===
In 2015, The Trump Organization sent the Mammadov family numerous default notices because of late payments relating to the project. In July 2015, a hotel spokeswoman said the project would open by the end of the year. The building was removed from the Trump Hotel Collection's website in September 2015. In March 2016, The Trump Organization stated that, "Due to the developer falling behind on certain construction milestones, the project is currently held in abeyance and not being actively marketed." A fire occurred inside the building on August 11, 2016.

After Trump was elected as U.S. president, The Trump Organization ended its affiliation with the un-opened project on November 30, 2016, more than a year after construction was delayed. The decision was announced on December 15, 2016. Alan Garten, chief legal officer for The Trump Organization, described the decision as "housecleaning" ahead of Trump's incoming presidential administration. At the time, a project official said the building was two-thirds finished and that it would open soon; a security guard at the tower believed the building would be ready by February 2017.

Scaffolding on the building in 2019. The former "Trump" branding had been removed by this point.

In December 2016, journalist Adam Davidson visited the property and later wrote that "from the road it looks ready to welcome the public. Reaching the property is surprisingly difficult; the tower stands amid a welter of on-ramps, off-ramps, and overpasses." Davidson described the project as being in an "oddly unglamorous location," being miles away from the main business district and surrounded by train tracks, a discount shopping center, and low-budget hotels. In March 2017, it was reported that the hotel's interior was nearly finished when construction stopped. The un-opened building caught fire again on April 28, 2018, when a fire broke out on the 18th floor. It burned for three hours before being extinguished, and was followed by a second fire that evening that was also put out. The cause of the fires was unknown and under investigation.

=== Opening ===
After several years of inactivity, the hotel was opened in 2022 under the Ritz-Carlton brand.

== Corruption ==
The Mammadov family was described as having a reputation for corruption. Davidson, who spoke with more than a dozen of the project's contractors, reported that some of them "described behavior that seemed nakedly corrupt." Frank McDonald, who performed extensive work on the interior, said his firm always received its payments in cash, and that other contractors were also paid the same way: "they would give us a giant pile of cash. I got a hundred and eighty thousand dollars one time, which I fit into my laptop bag, and two hundred thousand dollars another time." McDonald also recalled a time in which his colleague received a $2 million payment in cash. Bribes were also reported to have taken place at the site of the project. In a phone interview conducted by Davidson, Baillargeon hung up when asked if he had witnessed large cash payments during his time as the project's designer.

After Trump announced his U.S. presidential campaign in June 2015, several news organizations reported on his involvement with the project and with the Mammadov family. Garten said The Trump Organization had initially commissioned a risk assessment of the project and did not discover "any red flags" relating to the Mammadov family, which had financial connections with the Darvishi family of Iran. The Darvishis were associated with the Iranian Revolutionary Guard Corps (IRGC), which had been regularly accused by the U.S. government of criminal activity.

Garten said that the Trump Organization learned in 2015 that "certain principals associated with the developer may have had some association with some problematic entities." Despite the associations, The Trump Organization did not end its affiliation with the project and did not inquire about the Iranian Revolutionary Guard Corps. Garten said that the company's involvement with the Baku project was not terminated in 2015 because there was "no rush," as the project had already been delayed with no signs of progressing forward. Garten also said the company's involvement could not be terminated because of binding contracts. Garten further stated that the company never directly worked with Ziya Mammadov, and that Trump's role was limited to licensing his name and operating the hotel, saying that Trump did not invest any money into the project.

In March 2017, Garten said that The Trump Organization still did not know if the Mammadovs and the Darvishis were associated with each other or if the association was an allegation "spread by the media." Garten did not deny that corruption, through the Mammadovs, was involved in the project. Although Elton and Ziya Mammadov were Azerbaijan government employees at the time of Trump's involvement, Garten denied that The Trump Organization may have broken the Foreign Corrupt Practices Act, stating that the company did not own the project and did not pay money to anyone involved with it.

The Baku hotel deal is one of several of Trump's international real estate deals that have been stalled or derailed by allegations of corruption, bribery and money laundering.

=== Investigation ===
In March 2017, U.S. senator Sherrod Brown said a federal investigation of Trump's involvement with the project was warranted: "The Trump Organization's Baku project shows the lack of 'extreme vetting' Mr. Trump applied to his own business dealings in corruption-plagued regimes around the globe.... Congress—and the Trump Administration itself—has a duty to examine whether the President or his family is exposed to terrorist financing, sanctions, money laundering, and other imprudent associations through their business holdings and connections."

Later that month, Brown, along with senators Dianne Feinstein and Ben Cardin, wrote a joint letter to several officials in the Trump Administration, requesting an investigation to assess whether The Trump Organization broke several laws during its dealings with the Mammadov family: "It appears that the lack of due diligence by the Trump Organization ... exposed President Trump and his organization to notoriously corrupt Azerbaijani oligarchs, and may also have exposed the Trump Organization to the IRGC. Even though the Trump Organization appears to have withdrawn from the Baku Tower deal, serious questions remain unanswered about the Trump Organization's potential criminal liability."
