= Pirxana =

- Location within Azerbaijan
- Coordinates: 40°09′17″N 49°01′10″E
- Country: Azerbaijan
- Rayon: Hajigabul
- Time zone: UTC+4 (AZT)
  - Summer (DST): UTC+5 (AZT)

Pirxana is a village in the Hajigabul Rayon of Azerbaijan.
