= Şıxlar, Baku =

Shykhlar
- Azerbaijani: Şıxlar
- Location within Azerbaijan
- Coordinates: 40°01′11″N 49°26′07″E
- Country: Azerbaijan
- City: Baku
- Raion: Garadagh
- Municipality: Alat

Population (2008)
  - Total: 844
- Time zone: UTC+4 (AZT)
  - Summer (DST): UTC+5 (AZT)

Şıxlar (Shykhlar) is a settlement in Baku, Azerbaijan. The settlement forms part of the municipality of Alat in Garadagh raion.
