= Lökbatan Mud Volcano =

Highest point
- Elevation: 100 m (330 ft)
- Coordinates: 40°18′16″N 49°42′33″E

Geography
- Location: Lökbatan, Absheron Peninsula, Azerbaijan

Geology
- Mountain type: Mud volcano
- Last eruption: 2021 - 2022

Lökbatan Mud Volcano (Azerbaijani: Lökbatan palçıq vulkanı), also known as Lok-Batan Mud Cone, is a mud volcano located in Absheron Peninsula near the settlement of Lökbatan in Qaradağ raion of Baku, Azerbaijan.

== History ==
The mud volcano erupted in 1977 and again on October 10, 2001, when it released flames rising tens of meters into the air. Since 1998, the area has been included on UNESCO's World Heritage Site tentative list.
