= Ağacanlı =

- Municipality
- Location within Azerbaijan
- Coordinates: 39°59′00″N 48°50′56″E
- Country: Azerbaijan
- Rayon: Hajigabul

Population
  - Total: 351
- Time zone: UTC+4 (AZT)
  - Summer (DST): UTC+5 (AZT)

Ağacanlı (also, Agadzhanly) is a village and municipality in the Hajigabul Rayon of Azerbaijan. It has a population of 351.
