= Şubanı =

Shubany
- Azerbaijani: Şubanı
- Location within Azerbaijan
- Coordinates: 40°21′57″N 49°45′46″E
- Country: Azerbaijan
- Rayon: Baku
- Raion: Garadagh
- Municipality: Lokbatan
- Time zone: UTC+4 (AZT)
  - Summer (DST): UTC+5 (AZT)

Şubanı (also, Shubany) is a settlement in Baku, Azerbaijan. The settlement forms part of the municipality of Lokbatan in Garadagh raion.
