= Tağılı =

- Municipality
- Location within Azerbaijan
- Coordinates: 40°17′14″N 48°50′10″E
- Country: Azerbaijan
- Rayon: Hajigabul

Population
  - Total: 332
- Time zone: UTC+4 (AZT)
  - Summer (DST): UTC+5 (AZT)

Tağılı (also, Tagily and Tagyay) is a village and municipality in the Hajigabul Rayon of Azerbaijan. It has a population of 332.
