= In That Distant Neighboring Village =

Armenian-language films

- Directed by: Ara Shirinyan (Armenian film); Ayaz Salaev (Azerbaijani film)
- Written by: Tigran Paskevichyan (Armenian film); Eljan Mamedov (Azerbaijani film)
- Release date: 2006
- Running time: 25 minutes each
- Countries: Armenia (Armenian film); Azerbaijan (Azerbaijani film)
- Languages: Armenian (Armenian film); Azerbaijani (Azerbaijani film)

In That Distant Neighboring Village is the name of two 25 minute films, each depicting the lives of Armenians in the village of Aygepar, Armenia and Azerbaijanis in the village of Əlibəyli, Azerbaijan, both of which are visible from each other. The Armenian film was directed by Ara Shirinyan and scripted by Tigran Paskevichyan while the Azerbaijani film was directed by Ayaz Salaev and scripted by Eljan Mamedov. The filmmakers on both sides agreed that the films would be strictly symmetrical and that there would be no off-screen narration.

The films, which focus on the lives of the villagers before and after the First Nagorno-Karabakh War, were co-funded by the Armenian Branch of Catholic Relief Services (CRS), the Armenian Round Table Foundation (ARTF) and the Inter-Church Organization for Cooperation Development (ICCO) of the Netherlands.

== See also ==
- Nagorno-Karabakh
