= Nəvahı (settlement) =

Municipality in Hajigabul Rayon, Azerbaijan

Nəvahı is a settlement and municipality in the Hajigabul Rayon of Azerbaijan, distinct from the village and municipality of Nəvahı. It has a population of 2,293.
