= Rəncbər =

- Municipality
- Location within Azerbaijan
- Coordinates: 40°05′52″N 49°04′32″E
- Country: Azerbaijan
- Rayon: Hajigabul

Population
  - Total: 2,894
- Time zone: UTC+4 (AZT)
  - Summer (DST): UTC+5 (AZT)

Rəncbər (also, Radzhibar, Randzhabar, and Randzhbar) is a village and municipality in the Hajigabul Rayon of Azerbaijan. It has a population of 2,894.
