= Baş Ələt =

Baş Ələt (also, Bash Alat) is a village in the municipality of Alat in the Garadagh raion of Baku, Azerbaijan. It is twinned with Stoke-on-Trent, England.
