= Anar Mammadov =

Anar Mammadov is an Azerbaijani lobbyist, and businessperson. He is the billionaire son of Azerbaijan's former transport minister Ziya Mammadov, whom the BBC News has described as among "the wealthiest and most powerful in the governing elite" in Azerbaijan. The family's wealth stems from Ziya Mammadov's political connections to the authoritarian Aliyev regime in Azerbaijan, which has been characterized as one of the world's most corrupt.

He founded the Azerbaijan America Alliance, a pro-Azerbaijan lobbying group in the United States. In 2011, Mammadov registered as a foreign agent under the Foreign Agent Registration Act.

Mammadov was the local partner involved in the construction of the Trump Tower in Baku (which never opened).

According to Mother Jones, Mammadov "is rumored to be worth more than $1 billion."

Mammadov has invested more than $30 million in London property, as well as millions of dollars into the KFC franchise in England, through complex offshore financial structures.
