= Balıqçı =

Coordinates: 40°00′N 48°57′E

Balıqçı is a former village in the municipality of Qazıməmməd in the Hajigabul District of Azerbaijan.
