= Qarakosa =

Coordinates: 39.9386°N 49.3886°E

Qarakosa is a village in the municipality of Ələt in the Qaradağ raion of Baku, Azerbaijan.
