= Ələtli =

- Municipality
- Location within Azerbaijan
- Coordinates: 40°00′50″N 48°48′32″E
- Country: Azerbaijan
- Rayon: Hajigabul

Population
  - Total: 380
- Time zone: UTC+4 (AZT)
  - Summer (DST): UTC+5 (AZT)

Ələtli (Aletli) is a village and municipality in the Hajigabul Rayon of Azerbaijan. It has a population of 380. The municipality consists of the villages of Ələtli and Bürvənd.
