= Çeyildağ =

Cheyildagh
- Municipality
- Azerbaijani: Çeyildağ
- Location within Azerbaijan
- Coordinates: 40°16′56″N 49°16′45″E
- Country: Azerbaijan
- City: Baku
- Raion: Garadagh

Population
  - Total: 895
- Time zone: UTC+4 (AZT)
  - Summer (DST): UTC+5 (AZT)

Çeyildağ (also, Cheyildagh, Chair-Dagh, Cheil’dagh, and Chel’Dagh) is a settlement and municipality in Baku, Azerbaijan. It has a population of 895.

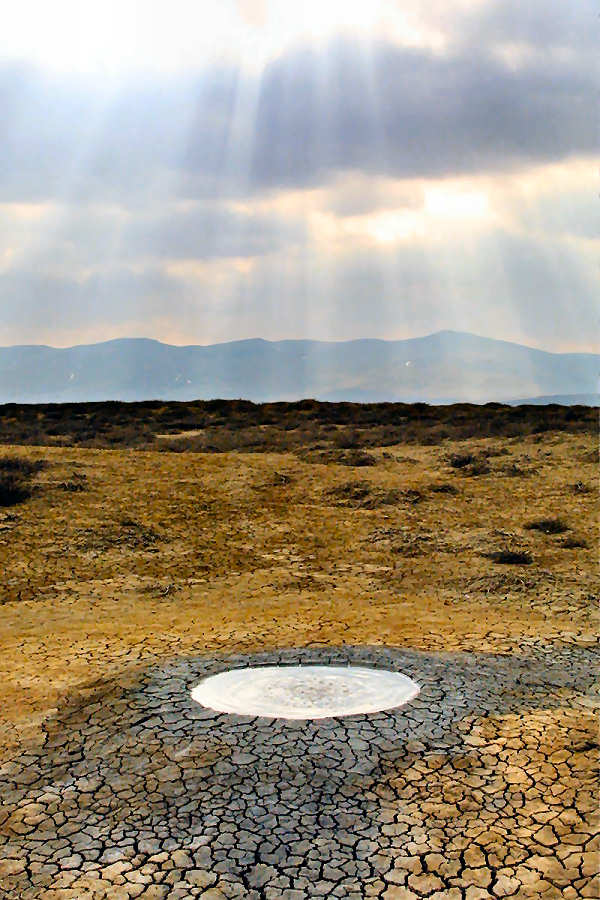
Çeyildağ - volcano
