= Alibey =

Alibey is a Turkic word that may refer to several places:

== Turkey ==
- Cunda Island, called Alibey Island in Turkish
- Alibey Dam, a dam in Istanbul Province
- Alibey, Bismil
- Alibey, Ilgaz
- Alibey, Kızılcahamam, a village in the Kızılcahamam district of Ankara Province, Turkey
- Alibey, Osmancık
- Alibey, Silvan
- Alibey, Susurluk, a village

== Ukraine ==
- Alibey Lagoon, Ukraine

== See also ==
- Alibeyli (disambiguation)
- Alibeyce, Emirdağ, a Turkish village in Afyonkarahisar Province
