= Ministry of Transportation (Azerbaijan) =

Government agency of Azerbaijan

Ministry of Transport of Azerbaijan Republic
- Azərbaycan Respublikasının Nəqliyyat Nazirliyi
- Coat of arms of Azerbaijan

Agency overview
- Formed: August 5, 1998
- Dissolved: February 13, 2017
- Headquarters: 1054 Tbilisi Avenue, Baku, Azerbaijan Republic AZ1122
- Agency executives: Ziya Mammadov, Minister of Transport; Musa Panahov, Deputy Minister
- Website: www.mot.gov.az

The Ministry of Transport of Azerbaijan Republic (Azerbaijani: Azərbaycan Respublikasının Nəqliyyat Nazirliyi) was a governmental agency within the Cabinet of Azerbaijan in charge of regulating transportation sector in Azerbaijan Republic. The ministry was headed by Ziya Mammadov until February 13, 2017, when the ministry was reformed into the Ministry of Transport, Communications, and High Technologies.

== History ==
The ministry was established on August 5, 1998, by the Presidential Decree No. 743. The statute of the ministry was approved by the President Heydar Aliyev on June 10, 2003. According to the ministry charter, it is responsible for the organization and implementation of state policies in the state railway, water, air, and automobile transportation sector. On February 13, 2017, the ministry was absorbed into the newly founded Ministry of Transport, Communications, and High Technologies.

== Structure ==
The ministry was headed by the minister of transport, aided by two deputies. Its main functions were the regulation of activities in the transportation sector of Azerbaijan consisting of transportation activities of entities by railway, water, automobile, air; shipping and expedition activities; design, projection and construction of roads, repairs and maintenance of roads; technical maintenance of hydrotechnical equipment in maritime transportation; preparation of human resources and implementation of scientific research; cooperation with transportation ministries in other countries for joint projects.

== Projects ==
The ministry was involved in big international projects such as TRACECA for revitalization of the Ancient Silk Way or the Kars-Tbilisi-Baku railway. Almost all transport projects within Azerbaijan, except for oil and gas pipelines such as Baku-Tbilisi-Ceyhan were regulated by the Ministry of Transport. High economic growth in Azerbaijan in recent years triggered many construction projects, including repairs and construction of new roads throughout the country. In 2004, 46 km (29 mi) road between Ələt and Qazıməmməd was built, 6 new overpass bridges were built in Gabala, Tovuz, Gadabay, Ujar, Quba and Biləcəri, 290 km (180 mi) and 178 km (111 mi) of existing roads, 3 bridges were extensively repaired. Several sections of major interstate roads, such as 508 km (316 mi) long Baku-Ələt-Qazakh highway, 85 km (53 mi) long Qazıməmməd-Kurdamir, 188 km (117 mi) long Kurdamir-Ucar-Yevlakh-Ganja were rebuilt according to international standards. In late 2009, the ministry signed a protocol with the Korean International Cooperation Agency for the feasibility study for Baku Bay Sea Bridge Project. The projected bridge will connect Shykh with Zığ settlement, stretching over the Bay of Baku for 14.5 km (9.0 mi). Transport Minister Ziya Mammadov and President of Stadler Rail Group Peter Spuhler informed the President that Swiss Stadler Rail Group and Azerbaijan-based Railway International Distribution LLC signed a contract on the establishment of a joint venture for wagon-assembling.

== See also ==
- Cabinet of Azerbaijan
- Transport in Azerbaijan
