= Navahı =

- Location within Azerbaijan
- Coordinates: 40°33′08″N 48°24′20″E
- Country: Azerbaijan
- Rayon: Agsu
- Municipality: Qazıməmməd, Hacıqabul rayonu
- Time zone: UTC+4 (AZT)
  - Summer (DST): UTC+5 (AZT)

Navahı (also, Navagi and Pashaly) is a village in the Agsu Rayon of Azerbaijan. The village forms part of the municipality of Qaraməmmədli. It is located 20 km from Hajigabul district and 90 km southeast of Baku city.
