= Pashaly Treti =

- Location within Azerbaijan
- Coordinates: 40°15′N 48°53′E
- Country: Azerbaijan
- Rayon: Hajigabul
- Time zone: UTC+4 (AZT)
  - Summer (DST): UTC+5 (AZT)

Pashaly Treti (also, Pashaly Tret’i, Orta Pashaly, and Pashaly Tretiy) is a village in the Hajigabul Rayon of Azerbaijan.
