= Ümid, Azerbaijan =

Ümid Ümid
- Urban-type settlement
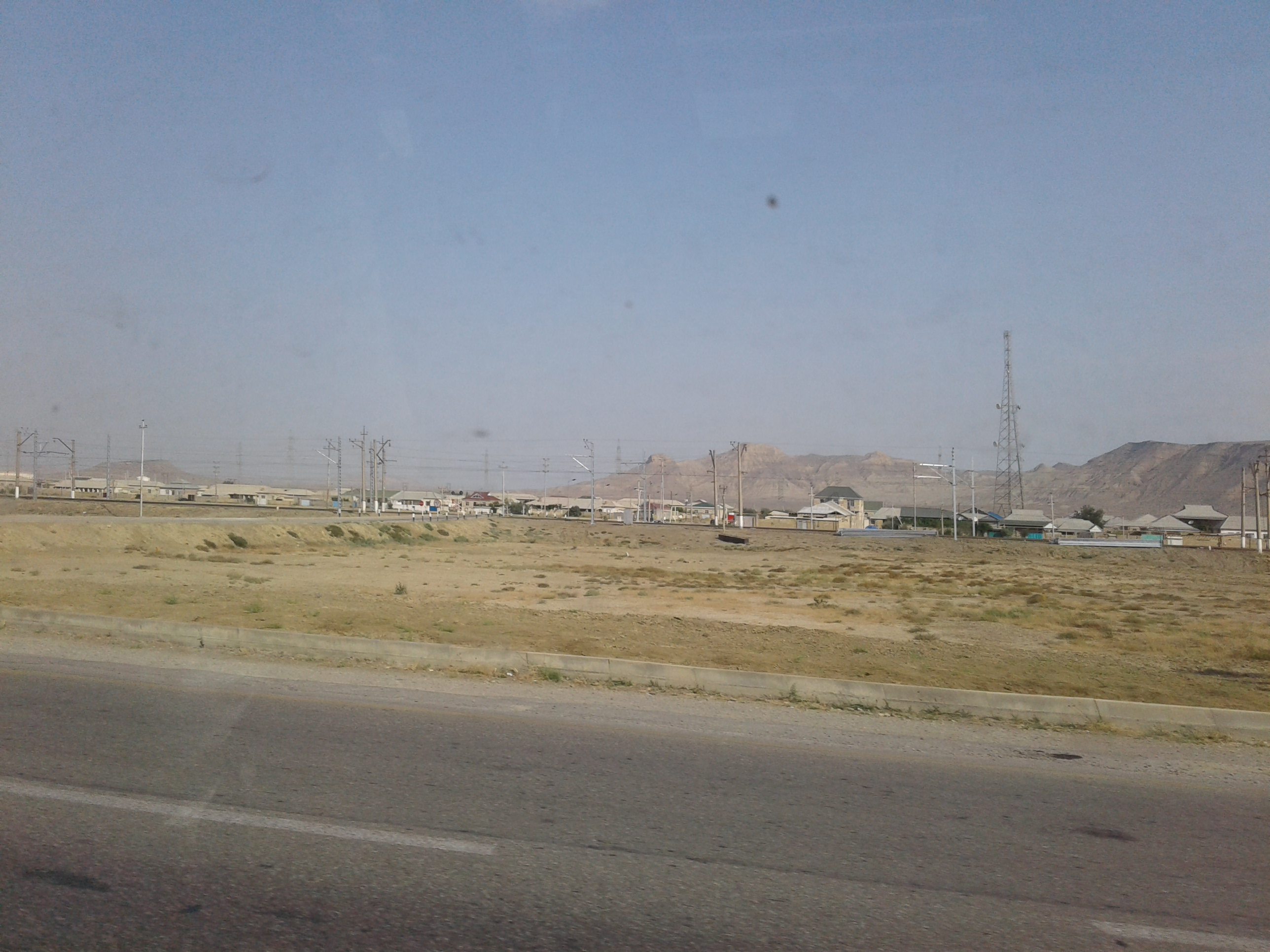

- Location within Azerbaijan
- Coordinates: 40°17′45″N 49°39′43″E
- Country: Azerbaijan
- City: Baku
- Raion: Qaradağ

Population (2019)
  - Total: 724
- Time zone: UTC+4 (AZT)
  - Summer (DST): UTC+5 (AZT)

Ümid is an urban-type settlement in the Qaradağ raion of Baku, Azerbaijan.

== History ==
The foundation of the settlement Ümid ("Hope") was laid according to the initiative and decree of the President Heydar Aliyev in 1999, with the commissioning of 110 private residential buildings for refugees from Armenia and internally displaced persons as a result of the First Nagorno-Karabakh War. In 2000, the settlement received the status of an urban-type settlement.

From 2005 to 2008, the Norwegian International Humanitarian Organization "Council for Refugees", the executive power of the Karadag region of Baku, as well as the Mishni community of the Lachin District of Azerbaijan, implemented a joint project, within the framework of which 110 cottages for community representatives were built in Ümid. Commissioning of 52 houses took place on 19 June 2013. The project was sponsored by the Norwegian Ministry of Foreign Affairs and the Norwegian oil company Equinor.
