= Pirsaat, Hajigabul =

Pirsaat
- Location within Azerbaijan
- Coordinates: 39°51′33″N 49°19′56″E
- Country: Azerbaijan
- Rayon: Hajigabul
- Time zone: UTC+4 (AZT)
  - Summer (DST): UTC+5 (AZT)

Pirsaat is a village in the Hajigabul Rayon of Azerbaijan.
