= İkinci Paşalı =

- Location within Azerbaijan
- Coordinates: 40°14′N 48°54′E
- Country: Azerbaijan
- Rayon: Hajigabul
- Municipality: Şorbaçı
- Time zone: UTC+4 (AZT)
  - Summer (DST): UTC+5 (AZT)

İkinci Paşalı (also, Malyye Pashaly, Pashaly Malyye, and Pashaly Vtoryye) is a village in the Hajigabul Rayon of Azerbaijan. The village forms part of the municipality of Şorbaçı.
