= Railway colleges in the Soviet Union =

Soviet Union railway colleges

This article includes railway colleges/universities/higher-educational-institutes in the Russian Empire, the Soviet Union, and the Post-Soviet states.

Railway colleges are higher educational institutes which train students for railway careers, mainly in engineering. They differ from other colleges by offering various classes on railway topics (such as railway electrification, railway operations, etc.) and most students major in some railway specialty. The Soviet Union inherited a few such colleges from the Russian empire and both expanded them and created many new railway colleges. After the demise of the Soviet Union and the resulting decline in railway transportation in the Post-Soviet states, most of these colleges (often renamed into universities) continued to operate with support from the government.

== Introduction ==
Railway colleges during the Soviet era prepared students for careers in various aspects of railroading, primarily as engineers. During the Soviet period they were often known as "higher educational institutes" (Russian: высшее учебное заведение (ВУЗ)), and this designation is still in use.

In 1967 they had a total of 215,000 students enrolled, about half of which were correspondence students. However, less than 7,000 students graduated each year, mostly in engineering (such as electrical, mechanical, or civil engineering with emphasis on railway applications).

Almost 10 years later (in 1976) they had a total of 130,000 students: 50,000 students, 12,000 night school students, and 52,000 correspondence students. There were 21 different fields of study including 3 new ones: computer science, applied mathematics, and automatic control systems. During the 9th 5-year plan (1970-1975) they graduated 66,000 engineers (a little over 12,000 per years) which is more than reported for the 1960s per above. In 1976 there were then a total of 15 institutes and 86 tekhnikums.

In 2015, about 25 years after the demise of the Soviet Union, railway universities are still quite active but the mission statements of the two largest ones don't even mention "railways". Instead, they imply their major mission is "transportation" which, of course, includes railways.

== Railway vocational schools ==
Besides railway colleges/universities, there were railway tekhnikums. These were schools which were mid-level educational institutions somewhat below the college level. They are often known as "colleges" in Russia today There was also a somewhat lower level of railway school known as a railway vocational school (Russian: профессиональное училище (ПУ)). Graduates of these two types of schools were qualified to become technicians, maintaining and repairing railway equipment and track, etc. Some became locomotive drivers along with some graduates of railway colleges.

== Lists of railway colleges ==
The lists below include the college Wikipedia page, location and founding year.

=== Belarus ===
- Belarusian State University of Transport in Gomel, 1953

=== Kazakhstan ===
- Kazakhstan Academy of Transport and Communications named M. Tynyshpaev (kk wiki) (in Kazakh) in Almaty, 1976

=== Latvia ===
- Institute of Railway Transport, now integrated into the Faculty of Transport and Mechanical Engineering of the Riga Technical University. The predecessor of this institute was a branch (since 1965) of the Soviet Leningrad institute of railway engineering and served the three Baltic states plus the Kaliningrad region.

=== Russian Federation ===
Two major railway universities in 2015 are in St. Petersburg and Moscow.

The Moscow "University" claims to be the 5th largest university in the world in terms of the number of students (about 60,000). This excludes correspondence students but might include students in the over 40 branches of the university in other cities and also might include students in the tekhnikum that merged into the university. However, only "17,000 undergraduate and postgraduate students" are claimed on the English part of the official university website:

In the abbreviated university names shown below, such as ПГУПС, Russian: ГУПС, Государственный Университет Путей Сообщения, lit. 'Government University of Railways' = "State University of Railways". The leading П in ПГУПС stands for Петербургский= Petersburg, the city where the university is located. The universities often have branches in other cities.

- St. Petersburg State Transport University in St. Petersburg, 1810
- Russian University of Transport, former Moscow State University of Railways (МИИТ=MIIT=МГУПС) (ru wiki)(in Russian) in Moscow, 1896
- Samara State University Railways (СамГУПС)(ru wiki) (in Russian) in Samara, 1973
- Omsk State Transport University in Omsk, 1900
- Rostov State Transport University in Rostov-on-Don, 1929
- Far East State University of Railways (ДВГУПС) (ru wiki) (in Russian) in Khabarovsk, 1939
- Irkutsk State University of Railways (ИрГУПС)(wiki) (in Russian) in Irkutsk, 1975
- Siberian State University of Railways (СГУПС) (ru wiki) (in Russian) in Novosibirsk, 1932
- Ural State University of Railway Transport in Yekaterinburg, 1956
- Russian Open Academy of Transportation (РОАТ)(ru wiki) (in Russian) with headquarters in Moscow, 1951. It is a correspondence school and is part of the Russian University of Transport.

Railway trade schools (tekhnikums), been taken in under the university umbrella and are now classified as branches of railway universities.

Russians today seem to be highly motivated to obtain a college education, even if the job prospects are not very good. It was thought by some that under capitalism, there would not be the surplus of college graduates that existed in the USSR. But it turns out that there is an even greater surplus today.

=== Turkmenistan ===
- Institute of Telecommunications and Informatics of Turkmenistan in Ashgabat, 1992 Question: This was founded shortly after the dissolution of the Soviet Union in an ex-Soviet republic. Was there a predecessor Soviet institution?

=== Ukraine ===
- Dnipro National University of Rail Transport in Dnipro, 1930
- Donetsk Railway Transport Institute in Donetsk, 1967
- Ukraine State University of Railway Transport (uk wiki) (in Ukrainian) in Kharkiv, 1930

=== Uzbekistan ===
- Tashkent State Transport University in Tashkent, 1931

== Textbooks for railway courses ==
A large number of titles of railway textbooks were published in the USSR. Examples of subjects covered are railway track, cars, locomotives, signalling and communications (including remote control and automation), transport economics, accounting, etc. Many such textbooks included mathematical formulas (and some had differential equations). Every year saw several new such textbooks (or revised editions of existing textbooks). Railway textbooks were also published for use by Railway vocational schools.

== Comparison with the United States ==
The United States once had railway university courses in Civil Engineering and there was a failed attempt at Harvard Business School to create a cadet-system of railway education in the 1920s.

After World War II the University of Illinois was the only major institution in the US providing instruction in railway engineering (in the Civil Engineering Dept.). After professor W.W. Hay retired from teaching railway engineering there, his position was not replaced and the railway courses were thus abolished. However, in the 1990s the University of Illinois restarted its railway engineering program and has the US' most robust railroad engineering and research program. A few other American universities, notably Michigan Tech and Purdue offer railroad engineering classes.

At Harvard Business School there were great expectations for the "cadet" program but the railroads failed to support it and the graduates from the program obtained positions in other industries. One observer of the railroad's attitude towards education stated that railway senior officials were the result of producing "the 'practical man' who had little use for anything learned in school". Wyckoff's book states (regarding the railroad's "Attitudes toward formal education") that "There was even evidence that the educated man was put upon and ridiculed by other middle managers and workers." Thus the railroads themselves appear to be at least partly responsible for the lack of college level railway education in the US.

Currently there are a number of community colleges that offer some rail training. One, for example, is Johnson County Community College which offers some training in conjunction with BNSF Railway. Some courses require permission of BNSF, like the course in thermite welding.
