= Birinci Paşalı =

- Location within Azerbaijan
- Coordinates: 40°13′31″N 48°54′31″E
- Country: Azerbaijan
- Rayon: Hajigabul
- Municipality: Şorbaçı
- Time zone: UTC+4 (AZT)
  - Summer (DST): UTC+5 (AZT)

Birinci Paşalı (also, Pashaly and Pashaly Pervyye) is a village in the Hajigabul Rayon of Azerbaijan. The village forms part of the municipality of Şorbaçı.
