= Şorbaçı, Hajigabul =

Şorbaçı
- Municipality
- Location within Azerbaijan
- Coordinates: 40°14′09″N 48°54′30″E
- Country: Azerbaijan
- Rayon: Hajigabul

Population
  - Total: 1,440
- Time zone: UTC+4 (AZT)
  - Summer (DST): UTC+5 (AZT)

Şorbaçı (also, Shorbachi, Shorbachy, Shorbachy Pervyye, and Shorbanchi) is a village and municipality in the Hajigabul Rayon of Azerbaijan. It has a population of 1,440. The municipality consists of the villages of Şorbaçı, Birinci Paşalı, and İkinci Paşalı.
