= Qubalı =

- Municipality
- Location within Azerbaijan
- Coordinates: 40°19′54″N 48°49′57″E
- Country: Azerbaijan
- Rayon: Hajigabul

Population
  - Total: 430
- Time zone: UTC+4 (AZT)
  - Summer (DST): UTC+5 (AZT)

Qubalı (also, Kubaly) is a village and municipality in the Hajigabul Rayon of Azerbaijan. It has a population of 430.
