= Pirsaat, Baku =

Pirsaat
- Location within Azerbaijan
- Coordinates: 39°54′36″N 49°24′41″E
- Country: Azerbaijan
- City: Baku
- Raion: Garadagh
- Municipality: Alat

Population (2008)
  - Total: 848
- Time zone: UTC+4 (AZT)
  - Summer (DST): UTC+5 (AZT)

Pirsaat is a settlement in Baku, Azerbaijan. The settlement forms part of the municipality of Alat in Garadagh raion.
