= Pirsaat, Nəvahı =

Pirsaat
- Location within Azerbaijan
- Coordinates: 40°03′16″N 49°03′23″E
- Country: Azerbaijan
- Rayon: Hajigabul
- Municipality: Nəvahı
- Time zone: UTC+4 (AZT)
  - Summer (DST): UTC+5 (AZT)

Pirsaat is a village in the Hajigabul Rayon of Azerbaijan. The village forms part of the municipality of Nəvahı.
