= Lökbatan =

Lokbatan
- Municipality
- Azerbaijani: Lökbatan
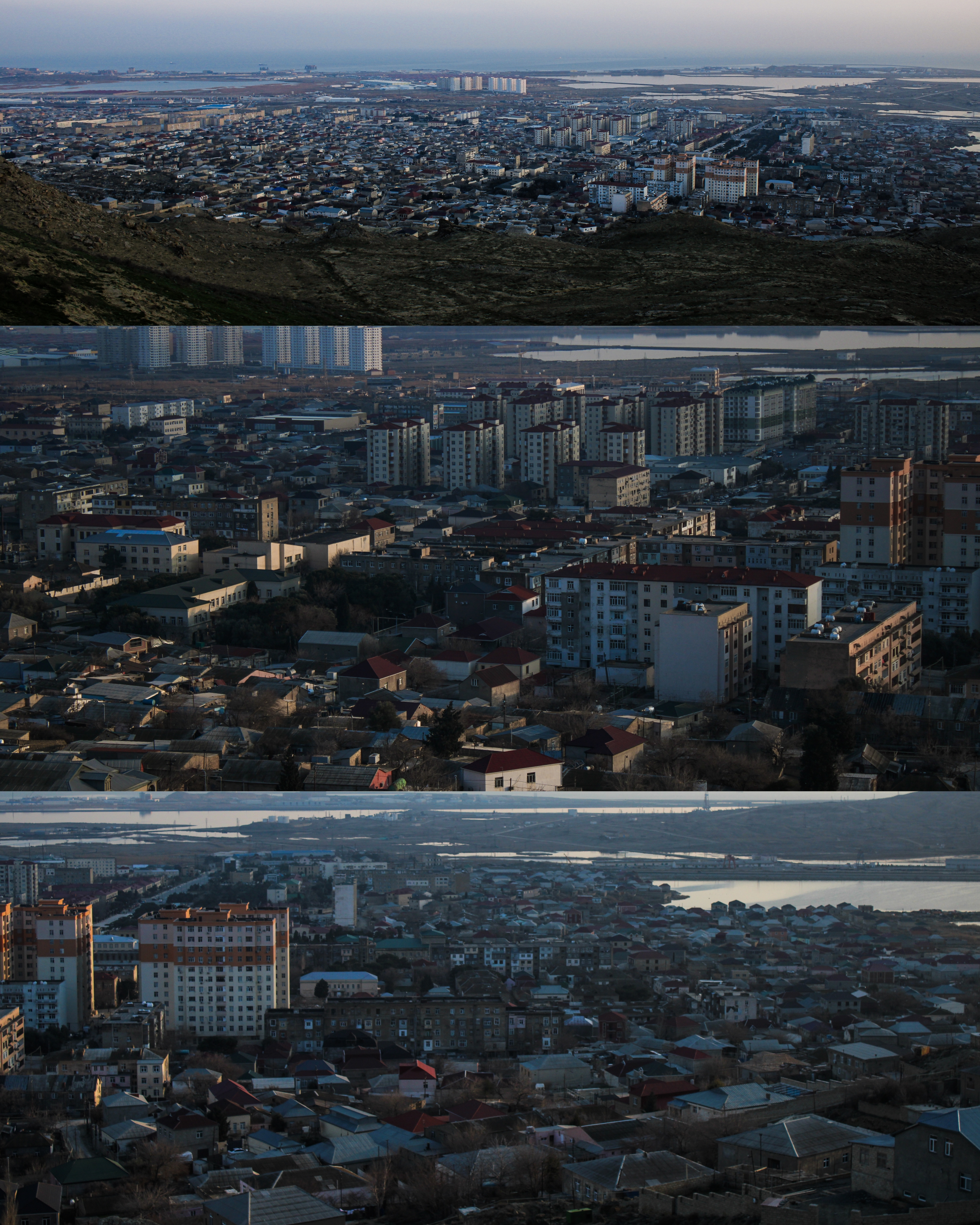

- Location within Baku, Azerbaijan Location within Azerbaijan
- Coordinates: 40°19′38″N 49°43′48″E
- Country: Azerbaijan
- City: Baku
- Raion: Garadagh

Population (2022)
  - Total: 41,365
- Time zone: UTC+4 (AZT)
  - Summer (DST): UTC+5 (AZT)

Lokbatan is a settlement and municipality in Baku, Azerbaijan. It has a population of 41,365. The municipality consists of the settlements of Lokbatan, Shubany, and Heybat. It is the location of a large mud volcano, and a historic oilfield. One of the first moving pictures filmed in Azerbaijan was of an oil well blowout in the 1930s. The mud volcano produced spectacular flames of natural gas in October 2001.

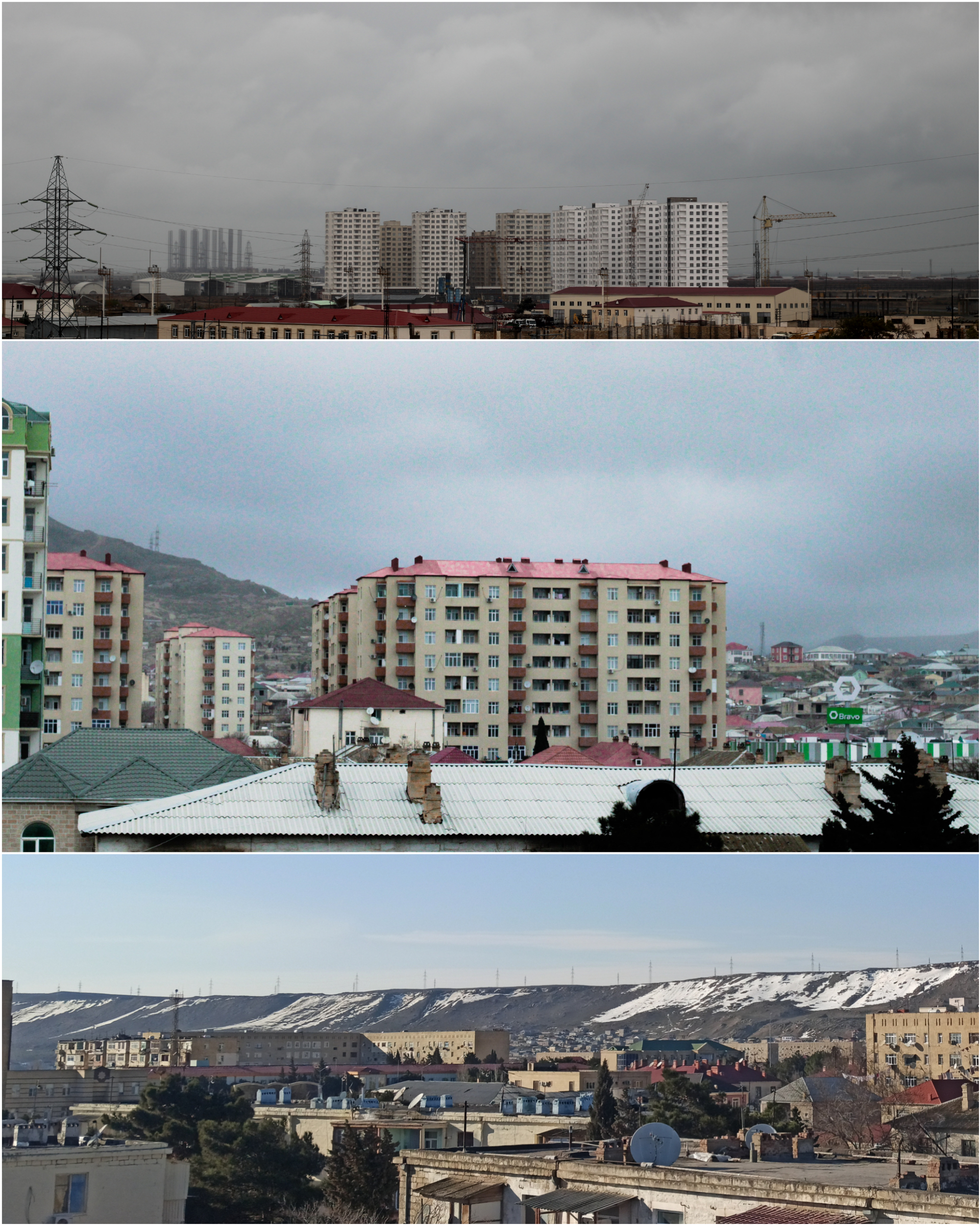
Lokbatan, 2021

== Culture ==
=== Sports ===
The city has one professional football team, Qaradağ Lökbatan, currently competing in the second-flight of Azerbaijani football, the Azerbaijan First Division.

== Transport ==
=== Road ===
Baku Ring Road.

=== Bus ===
Transport Interchange Center by BTA.

=== Airport ===
Baku Lokbatan Airport

== Notable natives ==
Firangiz Rehimbeyli - Azerbaijani singer and actress.

- Orkhan Lokbatanli - musician from Azerbaijan, known primarily as a singer.
