= Qızıldaş =

Gyzyldash
- Municipality
- Azerbaijani: Qızıldaş
- Location within Azerbaijan
- Coordinates: 40°18′30″N 49°35′55″E
- Country: Azerbaijan
- City: Baku
- Raion: Garadagh

Population
  - Total: 3,869
- Time zone: UTC+4 (AZT)
  - Summer (DST): UTC+5 (AZT)

Qızıldaş (also, Gyzyldash and Gyzyl-Tepe) is a settlement and municipality in Baku, Azerbaijan. It has a population of 3,869. The municipality consists of the settlements of Gyzyldash and Shongar.
