= Korgöz =

Korgoz
- Municipality
- Azerbaijani: Korgöz
- Location within Azerbaijan
- Coordinates: 40°18′11″N 49°37′12″E
- Country: Azerbaijan
- City: Baku
- Raion: Garadagh

Population
  - Total: 2,558
- Time zone: UTC+4 (AZT)
  - Summer (DST): UTC+5 (AZT)

Korgoz (also, Kar’yery and Kërgëz) is a settlement and municipality in Baku, Azerbaijan. It has a population of 2,558.
