= Qarasu, Hajigabul =

Qarasu
- Municipality
- Location within Azerbaijan
- Coordinates: 40°09′51″N 48°40′40″E
- Country: Azerbaijan
- Rayon: Hajigabul

Population
  - Total: 2,407
- Time zone: UTC+4 (AZT)
  - Summer (DST): UTC+5 (AZT)

Qarasu (also, Gadzhiyevo and Karasu) is a village and municipality in the Hajigabul Rayon of Azerbaijan. "Qarasu" means "black water" in the Azerbaijani language. It has a population of 2,407.
