= Nəvahı =

- Municipality
- Location within Azerbaijan
- Coordinates: 40°02′33″N 49°06′01″E
- Country: Azerbaijan
- Rayon: Hajigabul

Population
  - Total: 3,354
- Time zone: UTC+4 (AZT)
  - Summer (DST): UTC+5 (AZT)

Nəvahı (also, Navahı and Navagi) is a village and municipality in the Hajigabul Rayon of Azerbaijan. It has a population of 3,354. The municipality consists of the villages of Nəvahı and Pirsaat.
