= Qaraməmmədli, Agsu =

Qaraməmmədli
- Municipality
- Location within Azerbaijan
- Coordinates: 40°32′N 48°26′E
- Country: Azerbaijan
- Rayon: Agsu

Population
  - Total: 358
- Time zone: UTC+4 (AZT)
  - Summer (DST): UTC+5 (AZT)

Qaraməmmədli (also, Karamamedli) is a village and municipality in the Agsu Rayon of Azerbaijan. It has a population of 358. The municipality consists of the villages of Qaraməmmədli and Navahı.
