= Şorbaçı, Jalilabad =

Şorbaçı
- Municipality
- Location within Azerbaijan
- Coordinates: 39°15′30″N 48°19′19″E
- Country: Azerbaijan
- Rayon: Jalilabad

Population
  - Total: 605
- Time zone: UTC+4 (AZT)
  - Summer (DST): UTC+5 (AZT)

Şorbaçı (also, Shorbachi and Shorbachy) is a village and municipality in the Jalilabad Rayon of Azerbaijan. It has a population of 605.
