= Ələt =

- Municipality
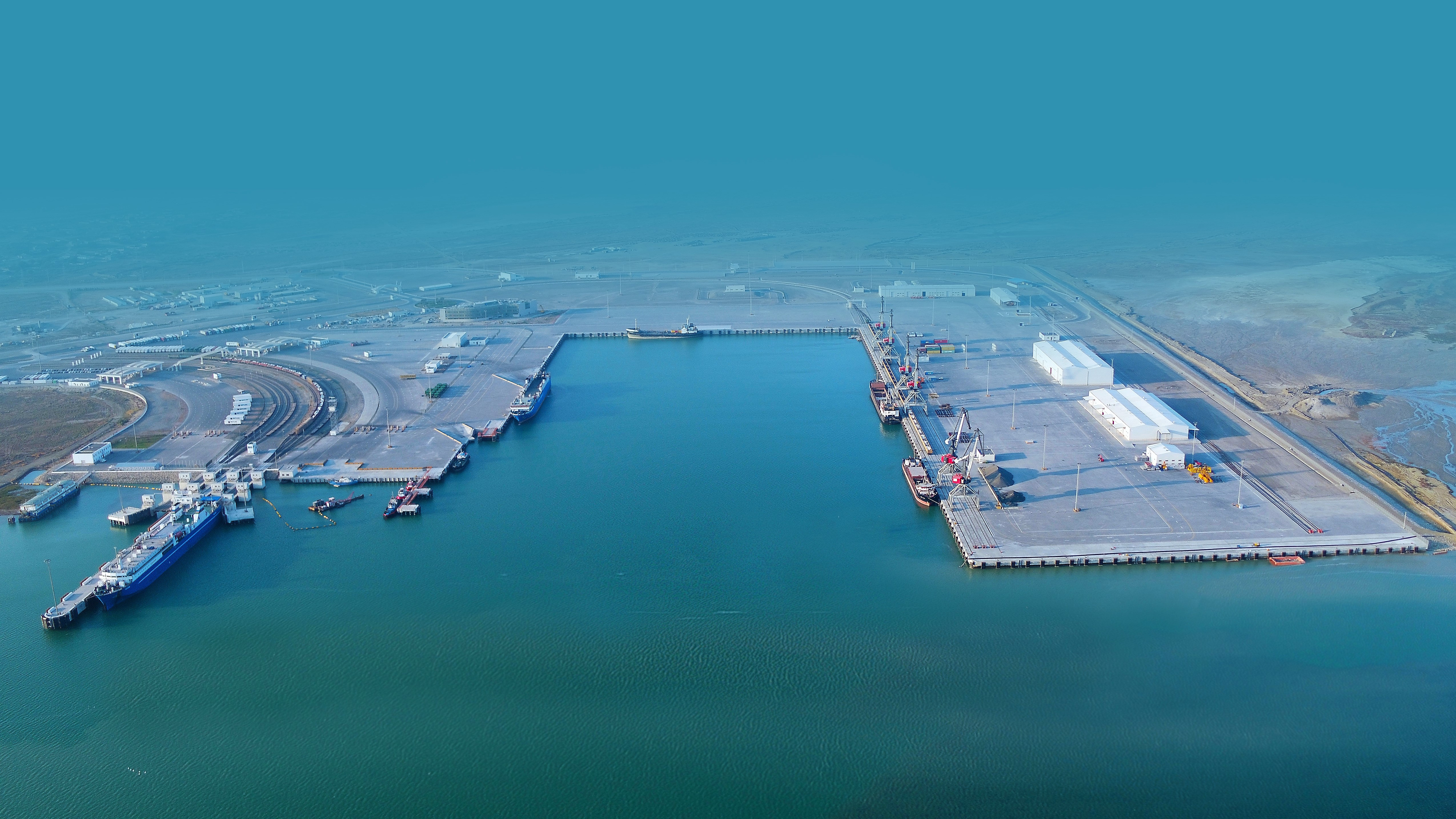
- New Port of Baku in Alat district, 2018.

- Location within Azerbaijan
- Coordinates: 39°56′28″N 49°24′22″E
- Country: Azerbaijan
- City: Baku
- Raion: Qaradağ

Population
  - Total: 12,765
- Time zone: UTC+4 (AZT)
  - Summer (DST): UTC+5 (AZT)

Ələt (also known as, Älät, Aliat, Aljat, Aliaty, Alyat, Alyat-Pristan’, Alyati-Pristan’, Alyaty, and Alyaty-Pristan’) is a settlement and municipality in Baku, Azerbaijan. It has a population of 12,765. The municipality consists of the settlements of Ələt, Pirsaat, Baş Ələt, Yeni Ələt, Qarakosa, Kotal, and Şıxlar. It is the nearest settlement to the Port of Baku, which was greatly expanded in 2018 to move cargo operations from the city of Baku, lying 70 km to the north.

== See also ==
- Gil Island (Azerbaijan)
