= Pirsaat (river) =

River in Azerbaijan

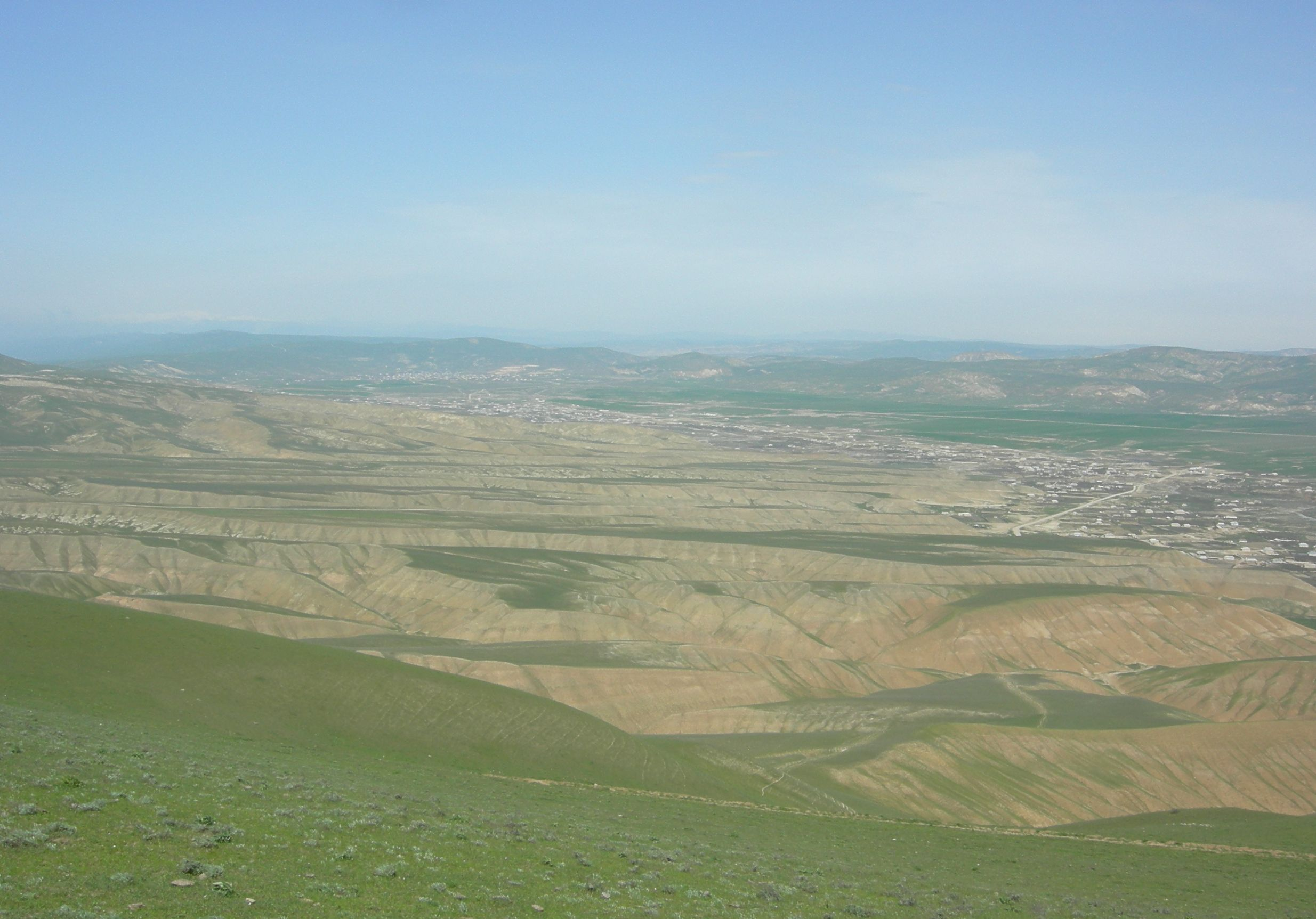
- Native name: Pirsaatçay (Azerbaijani)

Location
- Country: Azerbaijan

Physical characteristics
- Mouth: Caspian Sea
  - coordinates: 39.7905°N 49.3866°E
- Length: 199 km (124 mi)
- Basin size: 2,280 km^{2} (880 sq mi)

The Pirsaat (Azerbaijani: Pirsaatçay) is a river in Azerbaijan which flows through Ismailli, Shamakhi and Salyan Rayons. It discharges into the Caspian Sea near the village Xıdırlı. It is 199 km (124 mi) long, and has a 2,280 km^{2} (880 sq mi) drainage basin. The river is fed by snow, rain and groundwater. Its largest tributary is the Zoghalava.

On the right bank of the Pirsaat is Chukhuryurd village inhabited by molokans. The medieval Pirsaatchay Khanagah is at the Salyan portion of the river.
