= Kəsəmən, Samukh =

Kəsəmən
- Municipality
- Location within Azerbaijan
- Coordinates: 41°10′24″N 46°14′21″E
- Country: Azerbaijan
- Rayon: Samukh

Population
  - Total: 447
- Time zone: UTC+4 (AZT)
  - Summer (DST): UTC+5 (AZT)

Kəsəmən (also, Kesaman) is a village and municipality in the Samukh Rayon of Azerbaijan. It has a population of 447.
