= Shorbachy Vtoryye =

Shorbachy Vtoryye İkinci Şorbacı
- Location within Azerbaijan
- Coordinates: 40°13′42″N 48°54′23″E
- Country: Azerbaijan
- Rayon: Hajigabul
- Time zone: UTC+4 (AZT)
  - Summer (DST): UTC+5 (AZT)

İkinci Şorbacı is a village in the Hajigabul Rayon of Azerbaijan.
