= Xıdırlı, Qubadli =

Xıdırlı
- Location within Azerbaijan
- Coordinates: 39°25′09″N 46°32′15″E
- Country: Azerbaijan
- District: Qubadli
- Time zone: UTC+4 (AZT)
  - Summer (DST): UTC+5 (AZT)

Xıdırlı (Khydyrly) is a village in the Qubadli District of Azerbaijan.
