= Qaraməmmədli, Gadabay =

Qaraməmmədli
- Municipality
- Location within Azerbaijan
- Coordinates: 40°36′N 45°39′E
- Country: Azerbaijan
- Rayon: Gadabay

Population
  - Total: 1,491
- Time zone: UTC+4 (AZT)
  - Summer (DST): UTC+5 (AZT)

Qaraməmmədli (also, Karamamedli) is a village and municipality in the Gadabay Rayon of Azerbaijan. It has a population of 1,491. The municipality consists of the villages of Qaraməmmədli, Dikdaş, and Kəsəmən.
