= Əlibəyli, Zardab =

Əlibəyli
- Municipality
- Location within Azerbaijan
- Coordinates: 40°11′55″N 47°40′56″E
- Country: Azerbaijan
- Rayon: Zardab

Area
  - Total: 5.25 km^{2} (2.03 sq mi)

Population
  - Total: 1,050
- Time zone: UTC+4 (AZT)
  - Summer (DST): UTC+5 (AZT)

Əlibəyli (also, Alibeyli) is a village and municipality in the Zardab Rayon of Azerbaijan. It has a population of 917.
