= Qaraməmmədli, Yevlakh =

Qaraməmmədli
- Municipality
- Location within Azerbaijan
- Coordinates: 40°32′36″N 47°01′41″E
- Country: Azerbaijan
- Rayon: Yevlakh

Population
  - Total: 1,771
- Time zone: UTC+4 (AZT)
  - Summer (DST): UTC+5 (AZT)

Qaraməmmədli (also, Karamamedli and Karamamedly) is a village and municipality in the Yevlakh Rayon of Azerbaijan. It has a population of 1,771.
