= Kəsəmən, Gadabay =

Kəsəmən
- Location within Azerbaijan
- Coordinates: 40°36′22″N 45°38′48″E
- Country: Azerbaijan
- Rayon: Gadabay
- Municipality: Qaraməmmədli
- Time zone: UTC+4 (AZT)
  - Summer (DST): UTC+5 (AZT)

Kəsəmən (also, Kesaman) is a village in the Gadabay Rayon of Azerbaijan. The village forms part of the municipality of Qaraməmmədli.
