= Qaraməmmədli, Barda =

Village and municipality in Barda Rayon, Azerbaijan

Coordinates: 40.40162°N 47.16512°E

Qaraməmmədli is a village and municipality in the Barda Rayon of Azerbaijan. It has a population of 368.
