= Qaraməmmədli, Fizuli =

Qaraməmmədli
- Location within Azerbaijan Location within Karabakh Economic Region
- Coordinates: 39°37′38″N 47°07′26″E
- Country: Azerbaijan
- District: Fuzuli
- Time zone: UTC+4 (AZT)

Qaraməmmədli (also, Karamamedli and Karamamedly) is a village in the Fuzuli District of Azerbaijan.
