= Ziya Mammadov =

Azerbaijani politician

Ziya Mammadov Ziya Məmmədov
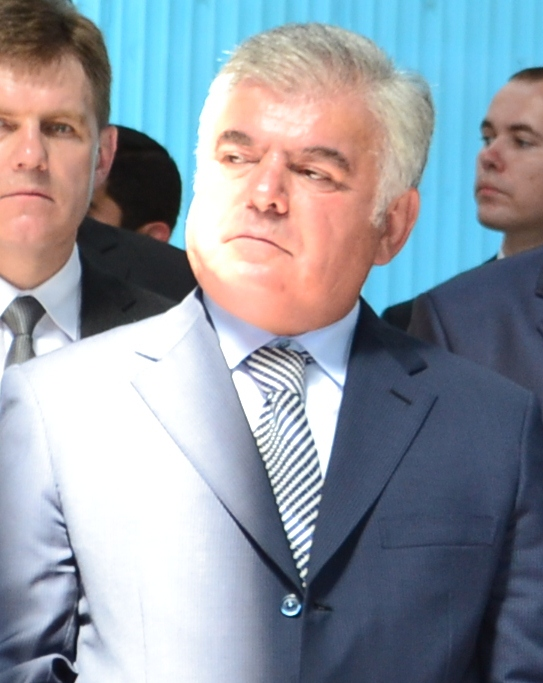

Minister of Transportation of Azerbaijan Republic
- In office 8 August 2002 – February 13, 2017
- President: Heydar Aliyev, Ilham Aliyev
- Preceded by: office established

Chairman of Azerbaijan State Railway Administration
- In office July 31, 1996 – August 8, 2002
- President: Heydar Aliyev

Personal details
- Born: April 28, 1952 (age 73) Azerbaijan

Ziya Mammadov Arzuman oglu (Azerbaijani: Ziya Məmmədov Arzuman oğlu) is an Azerbaijani politician and billionaire who served as the Minister of Transportation. BBC News has described him as among "the wealthiest and most powerful in the governing elite" in Azerbaijan. Mammadov has been implicated in a number of corruption scandals and exposes, including the Azerbaijani laundromat scandal.

== Early life ==
Mammadov was born in 1952 in Azerbaijan. He graduated from Rostov State Transport University. He was an assistant railway operator in Bilacari depot of the Azerbaijan State Railway in 1971. In 1972–1974, he served in the Soviet Army. Upon his return from military service, he worked for the railway until 1980. In 1980–1983, he was chairman of the Communist Party chapter in the Exploitation Department and then the chairman of the Committee of Colleagues of Bilacari Locomotive Depot.

From 1983 to 1984, Mammadov worked as a dispatcher in Azerbaijan Railway Service; from 1984 to 1987 as the Assistant Director of Human Resources of Bilacari Locomotive Depot; from 1987 to 1989 as the substitute director at Davachi depot; and from 1989 to 1991 as the Ganja Locomotive Depot Director. From 1991 to 1993, he was the Director of Locomotive Supplies Service at Azerbaijan Railway Service, and from 1993 to 1996, he was the Assistant Director for Locomotive Supplies Service at Azerbaijan State Railway Administration.

== Political career ==
On July 31, 1996, he was appointed the chairman of the Azerbaijan State Railway Administration by order No. 379 of the President of Azerbaijan Heydar Aliyev. He served in the position until August 2002.

On August 8, 2002, Mammadov was appointed the Minister of Transportation of the Azerbaijan Republic by Presidential Decree No. 750. He took office around the time when Azerbaijan was experiencing an oil boom.

As a minister, Mammadov called for raising the tariffs for railway freight transportation, one of the cheapest ways of transportation in Azerbaijan. On February 13, 2017 Ministry of Transportation of the Azerbaijan Republic was reformed into the Ministry of Transport, Communications, and High Technologies, and Ziya Mammadov left his position.

=== Corruption ===
In leaked diplomatic cables, Mammadov was described as "notoriously corrupt even for Azerbaijan". According to the New Yorker, in 2014, "Mammadov, a career government official, had a salary of about twelve thousand dollars, but he was a billionaire."

During his time as transportation minister, road construction cost Azerbaijan $18 million per kilometer, which was the most in the world by one estimate. An offer by Bechtel, an American contractor, to build roads at a cost of $6 million per kilometer were rejected. In his role as transportation minister, Mammadov established close relationships with the Darvishis, an Iranian family that has leadership positions in the Revolutionary Guard. At least eight transportation contracts were awarded to the Darvishis, including the Baku-Iranian Astara highway.

Ziya is involved with ZQAN, which has been described as the largest development company in Azerbaijan. ZQAN is an acronym for the family members of the Transportation Minister: Ziya; Qanira, Ziya's wife; Anar, Ziya's son; and Nigar, Ziya's daughter.

== Awards and titles ==
Mammadov holds a title of an Honorary Railway Worker. He is the member of the International Transport Academy and Honorary Citizen of Derbent city of Russian Federation.

== Personal life ==
He is married and has two children. His son, Anar, is involved in business dealings, such as the unfinished Trump Hotel in Baku. His brother, Elton, is a member of the Parliament.

== See also ==
- Cabinet of Azerbaijan
