= Əlibəyli, Tovuz =

Əlibəyli
- Municipality
- Location within Azerbaijan
- Coordinates: 40°56′15″N 45°29′39″E
- Country: Azerbaijan
- Rayon: Tovuz

Population
  - Total: 2,497
- Time zone: UTC+4 (AZT)
  - Summer (DST): UTC+5 (AZT)

Əlibəyli (also, Alibeyli) is a village and municipality in the Tovuz Rayon of Azerbaijan. It has a population of 2,497.

== Notable natives ==
- Gasim Rzayev — National Hero of Azerbaijan.
