= Alibeyli, Erdemli =

Alibeyli
- Neighbourhood
- Location in Turkey
- Coordinates: 36°41′N 34°02′E
- Country: Turkey
- Province: Mersin
- District: Erdemli
- Elevation: 1,240 m (4,070 ft)
- Population (2022): 585
- Time zone: UTC+3 (TRT)
- Postal code: 33730
- Area code: 0324

Alibeyli is a neighbourhood in the municipality and district of Erdemli, Mersin Province, Turkey. Its population is 585 (2022). It is situated in the Taurus Mountains where there are spruce forests. The distance to Erdemli is 40 kilometres (25 mi) and to Mersin is 75 kilometres (47 mi). The population of Alibeyli is composed of a once-nomadic tribe Bağdili (an Oghuz Turk tribe), which settled in 1800 in its present location. The major economic activity is fruit farming with peaches, apples, and cherries being among the main crops of the village.
