= Xıdırlı, Salyan =

Xıdırlı
- Municipality
- Location within Azerbaijan
- Coordinates: 39°50′38″N 49°19′12″E
- Country: Azerbaijan
- Rayon: Salyan

Population
  - Total: 2,977
- Time zone: UTC+4 (AZT)
  - Summer (DST): UTC+5 (AZT)

Xıdırlı (also, Chidirly, Khidirly, Khidyrly, Khydyrly, and Kochev’ye) is a village and municipality in the Salyan Rayon of Azerbaijan. It has a population of 2,977.
