= Hajiqabul =

Hajigabul Hacıqabul
- City and Municipality
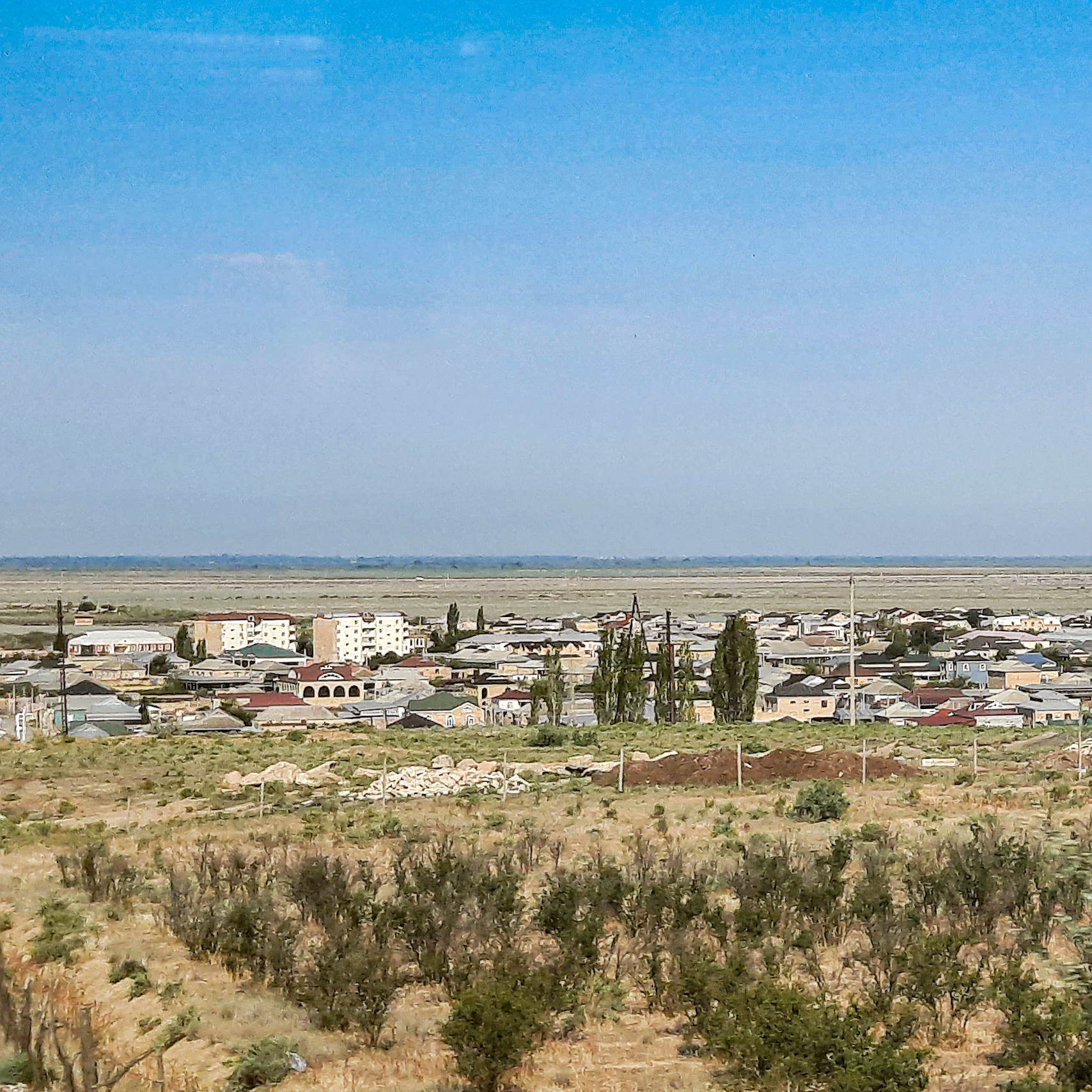

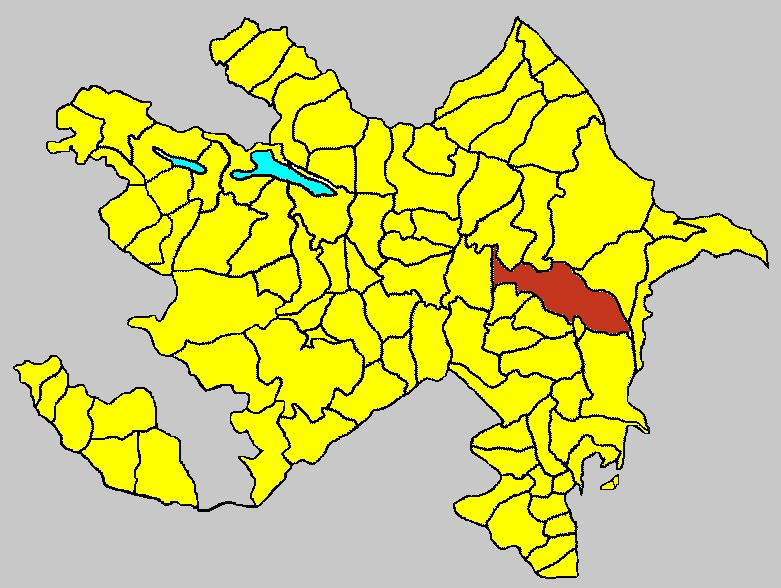

- Location within Azerbaijan
- Coordinates: 40°02′36″N 48°56′08″E
- Country: Azerbaijan
- District: Hajigabul

Population
  - Total: 27 536
- Time zone: UTC+4 (AZT)

Hajigabul (Azerbaijani: Hacıqabul) is a town, municipality and the capital of Hajigabul District of Azerbaijan. It has a population of 23,512. The municipality consists of the city of Qazıməmməd and the village of Balıqçı.

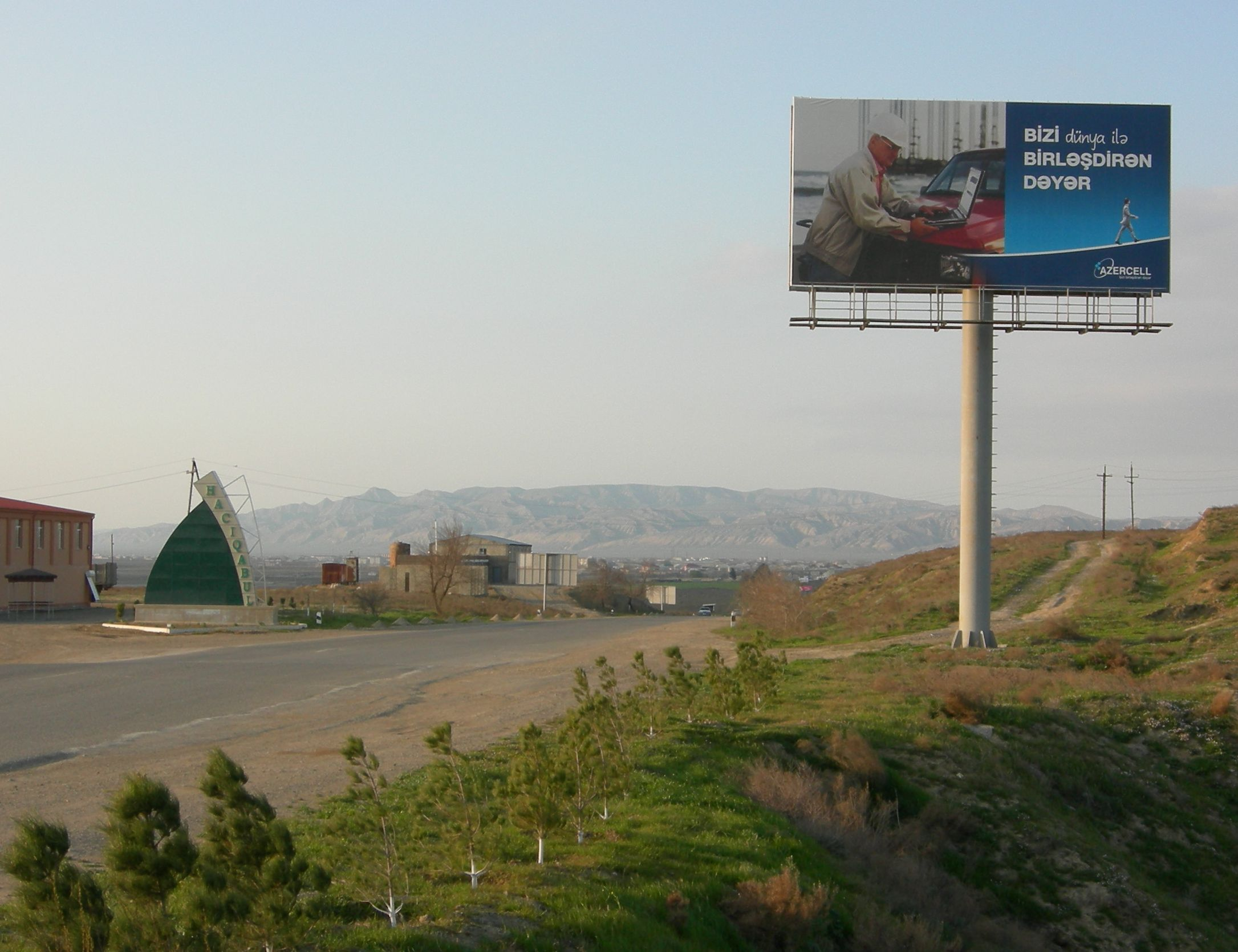
Haciqabul road sign

== History ==
It was named after a nearby eponymous lake; the name literally means bitter lake in Azerbaijani. It was granted urban-type settlement status in 1934 and town status in 1938. In 1939, the town was renamed Kazi-Magomed (alternatively spelled Qaziməmməd and Qazıməmməd), after revolutionary Kazi Magomed Agasiyev. The original name was restored in 2000.

== Transportation ==
=== Rail ===
Kars–Tbilisi–Baku railway will directly connect the city with Turkey and Georgia

Hajiqabul sits on one of the Azerbaijani primary rail lines running east–west, connecting the capital, Baku, with the rest of the country. The Kars–Tbilisi–Baku railway will run along the line through the city. The railway provides both human transportation and transport of goods and commodities such as oil and gravel.

Hajiqabul's Central Railway Station is the terminus for national and international rail links to the city. The construction of the Kars–Tbilisi–Baku railway, which will directly connect Turkey, Georgia, and Azerbaijan, began in 2007 and is scheduled for completion in 2015. The completed branch will connect the city with Tbilisi in Georgia, and from there trains will continue to Akhalkalaki, and Kars in Turkey.

== Economy ==
People are mainly employed in manufacturing, transportation, and service sectors. The largest employer operating in Hajiqabul is Hajiqabul Industrial Park, which includes the Automobile Plant by AzerMash.

Azermash and UzAuto Motors have started building a new car plant in Azerbaijan totaling nearly $52 mln. The groundbreaking ceremony took place on Monday, May 1, 2023 in the Hajigabul industrial quarter, Hajigabul district. The plant's capacity will be 30,000 vehicles per year. The plant will assemble, weld bodies, and paint cars. Azermash CP is constructing the facility. Investments in the project are estimated at 88 million manat [$51.8 million at the current exchange rate]. More than 1,200 jobs will be created at the enterprise. The car plant is scheduled to be put into operation in May 2025. The manufactured cars will be sold on both the domestic market and will be exported.

== Notable people ==
- Boris Litvinchuk, Hero of the Soviet Union
