= Birinci Alıbəyli, Zangilan =

Birinci Alıbəyli
- Location within Azerbaijan
- Coordinates: 39°09′44″N 46°44′24″E
- Country: Azerbaijan
- District: Zangilan

Population (2015)
  - Total: 241
- Time zone: UTC+4 (AZT)

Birinci Alıbəyli (Birinji Alybeyli) is a village in the Zangilan District of Azerbaijan.

== History ==
The village was located in the Armenian-occupied territories surrounding Nagorno-Karabakh, coming under the control of ethnic Armenian forces during the First Nagorno-Karabakh War in the early 1990s. The village subsequently became part of the breakaway Republic of Artsakh as part of its Kashatagh Province, referred to as Yeritsvank (Armenian: Երիցվանք). It was recaptured by Azerbaijan during the 2020 Nagorno-Karabakh war.
