= İkinci Alıbəyli, Zangilan =

İkinci Alıbəyli
- Location within Azerbaijan
- Coordinates: 39°09′16″N 46°44′58″E
- Country: Azerbaijan
- Rayon: Zangilan
- Time zone: UTC+4 (AZT)
  - Summer (DST): UTC+5 (AZT)

İkinci Alıbəyli (also, İkinji Alibeyli) is a village in the Zangilan Rayon district in the south-west of Azerbaijan.
