= Alibeyli, Tarsus =

Alibeyli
- Neighbourhood
- Location in Turkey
- Coordinates: 37°07′N 34°50′E
- Country: Turkey
- Province: Mersin
- District: Tarsus
- Elevation: 480 m (1,570 ft)
- Population (2022): 333
- Time zone: UTC+3 (TRT)
- Area code: 0324

Alibeyli is a neighbourhood in the municipality and district of Tarsus, Mersin Province, Turkey. Its population is 333 (2022). It is situated to the west of Turkish state highway D.750. The distance to Tarsus is 30 kilometres (19 mi) and 60 kilometres (37 mi) to Mersin. The main agricultural product of the village is grape.
