= Qaradağ raion =

Garadagh
- Raion
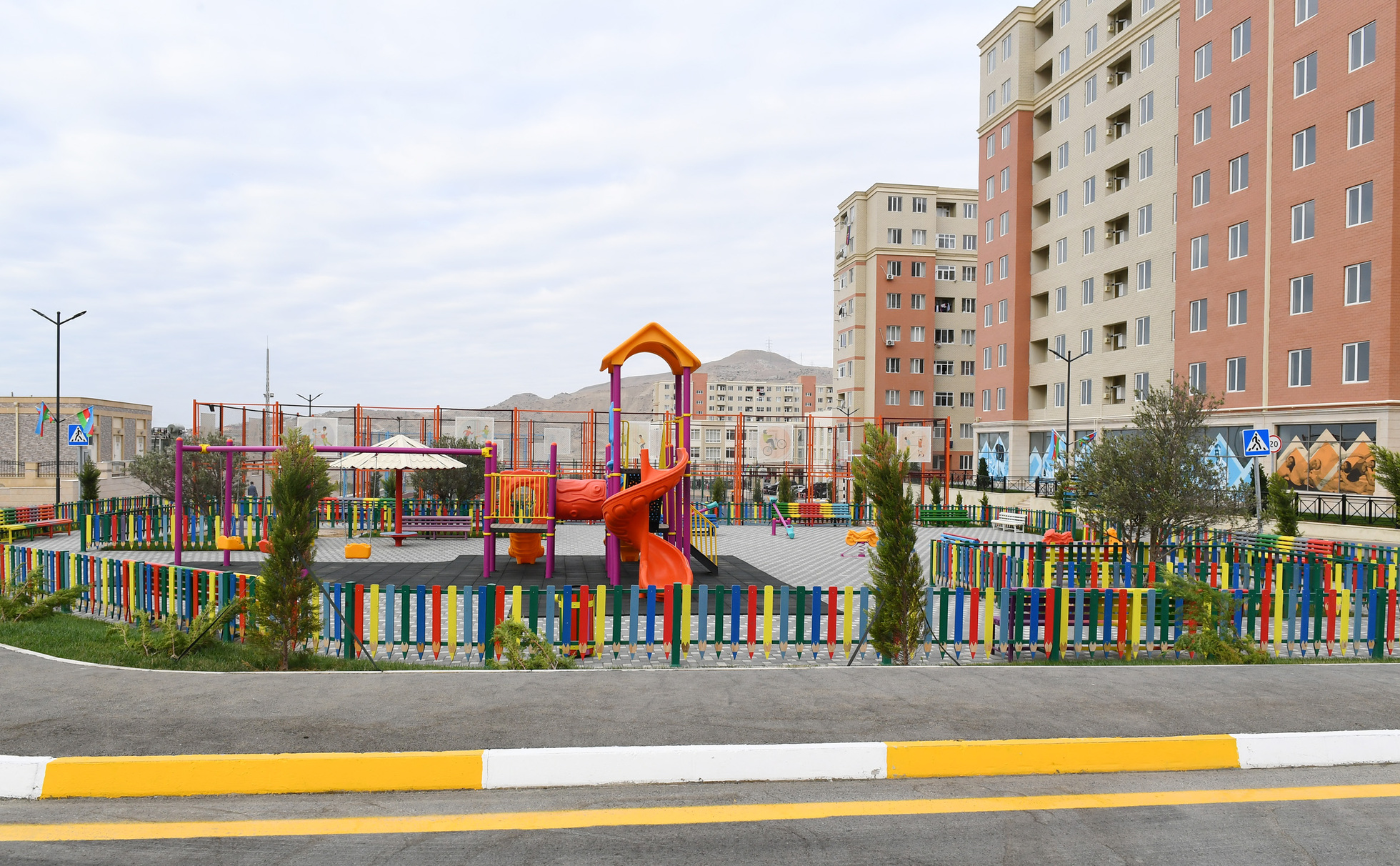
- Garadagh District

- Location within Azerbaijan
- Coordinates: 40°15′52″N 49°36′27″E
- Country: Azerbaijan
- District: Baku
- Date of establishment: 1923

Population (2022)
  - Total: 128 717
- Time zone: UTC+4 (AZT)
  - Summer (DST): UTC+4 (AZT)
- Website: http://qaradagh-ih.gov.az/az

Garadagh (Azerbaijani: Qaradağ) is a settlement and raion in Baku, Azerbaijan. It has a population of 128 717. The urban-type settlement of Lokbatan is the center of the region.

== Municipalities ==
It contains the municipalities of Alat, Cheyildagh, Korgoz, Lokbatan, Mushfigabad, Puta, Qızıldaş, Gobustan, Sahil, Ümid and Sangachal.

== Transport ==
European route E119 passes by Garadag.
