= Hajigabul District =

District in eastern Azerbaijan

Coordinates: 40.037999°N 48.937038°E

- District
- Map of Azerbaijan showing Hajigabul District
- Country: Azerbaijan
- Region: Shirvan-Salyan
- Established: 24 April 1990
- Capital: Hajigabul
- Settlements: 31

Government
  - Governor: Sevindik Hatamov

Area
  - Total: 1,600 km^{2} (620 sq mi)

Population (2020)
  - Total: 77 027
  - Density: 0.048/km^{2} (0.12/sq mi)
- Time zone: UTC+4 (AZT)
- Postal code: 2400
- Website: haciqabul-ih.gov.az

Hajigabul District (Azerbaijani: Hacıqabul rayonu) is one of the 66 districts of Azerbaijan. It is located in the east of the country, in the Shirvan-Salyan Economic Region. The district borders the districts of Kurdamir, Agsu, Shamakhi, Gobustan, Absheron, Baku, Salyan, Sabirabad and the city of Shirvan. Its capital and largest city is Hajigabul. As of 2020, the district had a population of 76,600.

== History ==
Hajigabul district, located on the Silk Road, was part of the Arab Caliphate, Seljuk, Sacids, Hulakids, Shirvanshahs, Safavids at different times. During the division of the State into the Khanates, the district was included in the Shamakhi khanate. After the joining of North Azerbaijan to Tsardom of Russia, it was included in Shamakhi Uyezd of the Caspian province which was established in 1830. After the abolition of the Caspian province in 1841, it was included in the Shamakhi governorate. After the devastating earthquake in 1859 in Shamakhi, the capital of the governorate was moved to Baku. In 1860 - 1930, Hajigabul was part of the Shamakhi Uyezd in the Baku province. On August 8, 1930, Uyezd was abolished and as a result of this, the new Garasu was established. Since November 29, 1938, city status has been awarded to Hajigabul.

== Divisions ==
There are 31 populated areas. One of them is a city, 1 city-like settlement, 4 settlements and 25 villages. There are 15 administrative-territorial units, 5 medical institutions and 55 cultural centres. The Pirsaat River and Prsaat valley is located in this region.

== Population ==
According to the report of the Statistical Committee of the republic, the population was 74.7 thousand at the beginning of 2018, of which 37.4 thousand lived in urban areas and 37.3 thousand in rural areas.

Population of Hajigabul by the year (at the beginning of the year, thsd. persons)
Population	1999	2000	2001	2002	2003	2004	2005	2006	2007	2008	2009	2010	2011	2012	2013	2014	2015	2016	2017	2018	2019	2020	2021
Hajigabul region	57,9	58,5	59,1	59,7	60,2	60,7	61,7	63,0	63,9	64,8	65,7	66,5	67,3	68,3	69,1	70,1	71,2	72,5	73,6	74,7	75,6	76,6	77,1
urban areas	26,4	26,8	27,1	27,3	27,6	31,7	32,2	32,6	33,0	33,4	33,8	34,1	34,5	34,8	35,2	35,5	36,0	36,5	37,0	37,4	37,7	38,0	38,2
rural areas	31,5	31,7	32,0	32,4	32,6	29,0	29,5	30,4	30,9	31,4	31,9	32,4	32,8	33,5	33,9	34,6	35,2	36,0	36,6	37,3	37,9	38,6	38,9

== Economy ==
The Baku-Tbilisi railway and 82 km of the Silk Road pass through the region. Over 35 state and private institutions operate in Hajigabul. The largest of these institutions is the Department of the operation of Kura Water pipelines. It was opened in 1971. It provides the surrounding areas and capital of the country with drinking water. The Gas Pipeline Production Department and the "Kalmaz" Underground Gas Storage meet the natural gas demand of the Republic. Railway institution operates in the district. Poultry farms named "Adishirin" and "Pirsaat" meet the egg demand of Hajigabul and nearby areas. Both farms have been operating since the independence period. Although the economy of the region is based on agriculture, recently an automobile plant put into operation in Hajigabul Industrial Estate based on the cooperation between Russian Gas Group and Azermash OJSC. Additionally, according to the order of the president of the Republic of Azerbaijan dated 2017, an industrial district will be established in Hajigabul which is considered to develop and regulated by Azerbaijan Investment Company OJSC.

== Agriculture ==
Agriculture plays a key role in the economy of the district which includes livestock, grain growing, cotton growing, horticulture and especially melon and watermelon growing.

Agriculture
	2010	2013	2014	2015	2016	2017
Total area of sown agricultural crops (ha)						
Cereals and cereal legumes	9171	12377	12689	12919	14179	15216
Including wheat	4730	6288	6415	6475	7130	7478
Cotton	-	-	-	-	526	1204
Sugar beet	-	-	-	-	160	556
Sunflower for seed production	24	78	75	49	-	-
Potato	-	38	38	39	40	42
Vegetables	520	728	761	776	781	442
Horticulture	1038	1618	1579	1572	1572	828
Fruit and berry	1303	1431	1431	1431	1437	1437
Grape	98	115	115	115	115	115
Productivity (in all categories of farming), ton						
Cereals and cereal legumes	26874	37010	37909	44146	51241	50329
Including wheat	16110	21865	22213	24735	25922	24136
Cotton	-	-	-	-	800	1000
Sugar beet	-	-	-	-	5400	22821
Sunflower for seed production	29	103	102	67	-	-
Potato	-	417	418	428	451	461
Vegetables	13540	18959	19818	20216	20431	7295
Horticulture	15258	23882	23306	23306	23428	11675
Fruit and berry	5850	10997	11051	11057	11205	11314
Grape	180	252	253	264	261	262
Productivity (in all categories of farming), centner / ha						
Cereals and cereal legumes	29.3	29.9	29.9	34.2	34.8	32.9
Including wheat	34.1	34.8	34.6	38.2	36.4	32.3
Cotton	-	-	-	-	15.2	8.3
Sugar beet	-	-	-	-	388	459
Sunflower for seed production	12.1	13.2	13.6	13.7	-	-
Potato	-	110	110	110	110	110
Vegetables	260	260	260	260	260	157
Horticulture	147	148	148	148	148	141
Fruit and berry	47.8	80.8	81.2	81.2	78.8	80.2
Grape	21.2	29.1	29.1	29.1	22.8	22.8
Number of Livestock (in total)						
Cattle	35163	37241	37508	37819	38414	38798
Including cow and buffalo	14948	15675	15858	15990	16245	16424
Sheep and goats	124600	132325	133765	134838	135956	136906
Birds	1377872	2870130	3632510	4637392	3414135	3798969
Production of animal products, ton						
Meat	2817	3418	5777	5984	6175	5360
Milk	13800	17168	17172	17217	17242	17253
Eggs	113480	280355	327071	331199	327143	350497
Wool	206	223	224	225	225	228

== Geography ==
Hajigabul district mainly is located in the Shirvan plain, and it is below sea level. The Neocene and Anthropogenic sediments cover the surface of the plain. The soil of the region is composed of grey-brown, grey-meadow, saline soils. Like other regions of Shirvan-Salyan Economic Region, it is also possible to encounter mud volcanoes in the Hajigabul district. Oil, gas, clay and oak are the main minerals of the region. The river system is very sparse due to its climate. The Kur and Pirsaat rivers, Hajigabul Lake are the major water sources are in the territory of the region. The vegetation is half-desert type. The gazelles, the red-tailed sandwiches, the turtle, the turquoise and the pigeon are the typical animals of the district.

== Climate ==
Hajigabul district has a dry subtropical climate with hot summers and cool winters, with some to minimal precipitation. The level of precipitation heavily depends on seasonality so that the region receives considerably more rains during the winter period rather than in the summer. The average temperature is 2 °C in January and 26 °C in July, respectively.

== Gallery ==
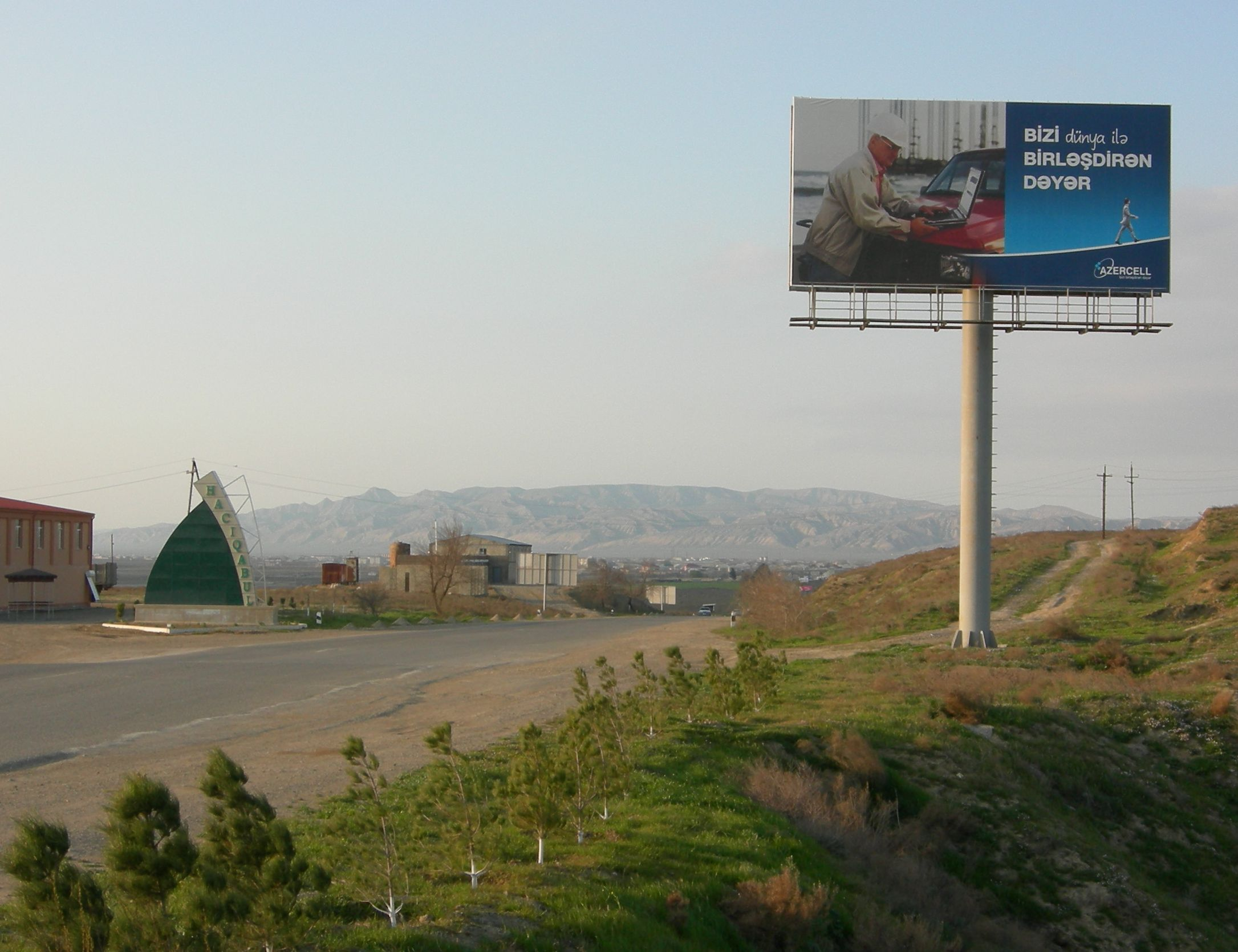
Road from Shirvan reaching Hajigabul District. Hacıqabul city (or Qazıməmməd) in the background

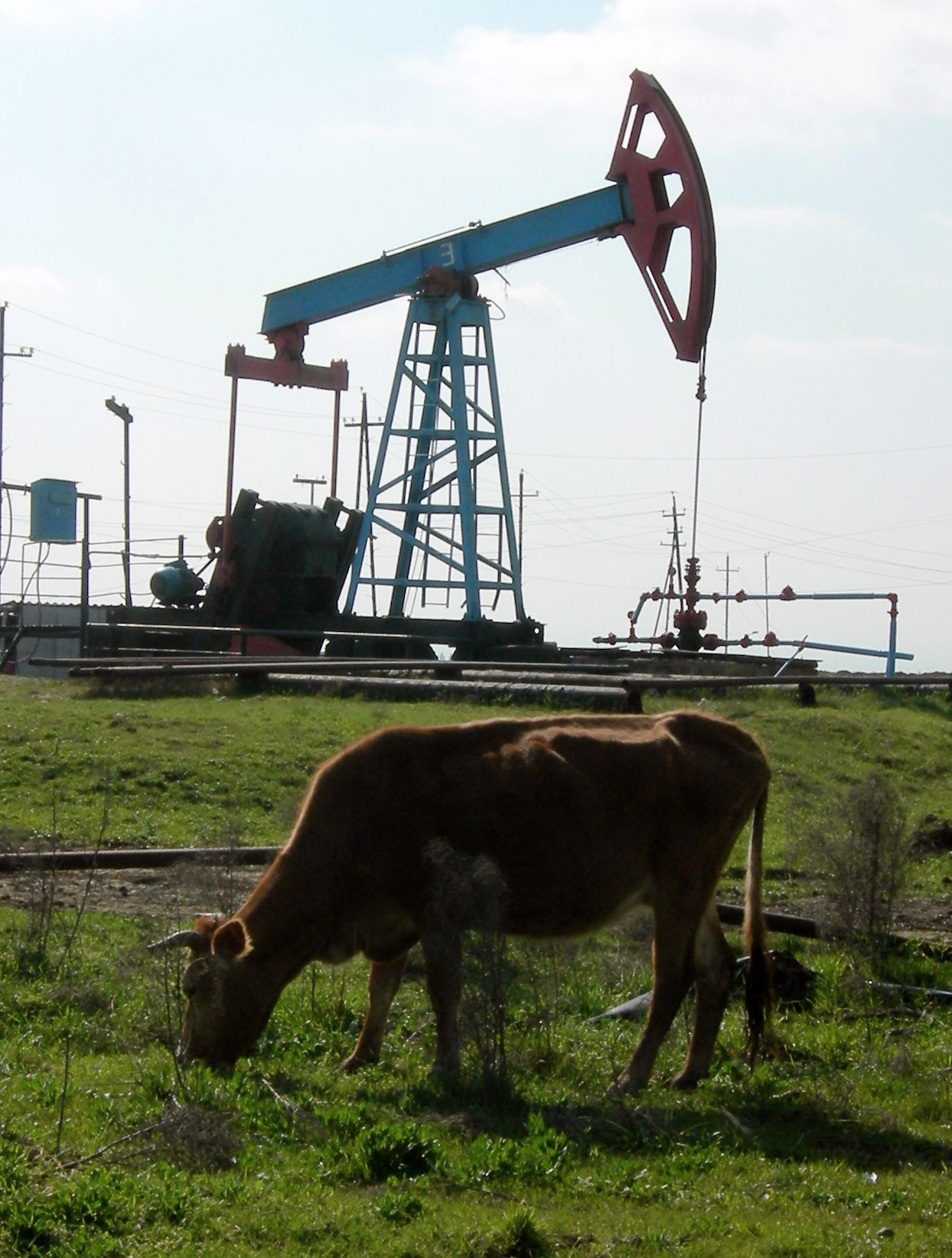
Onshore oil in the vicinity of Hacigabul

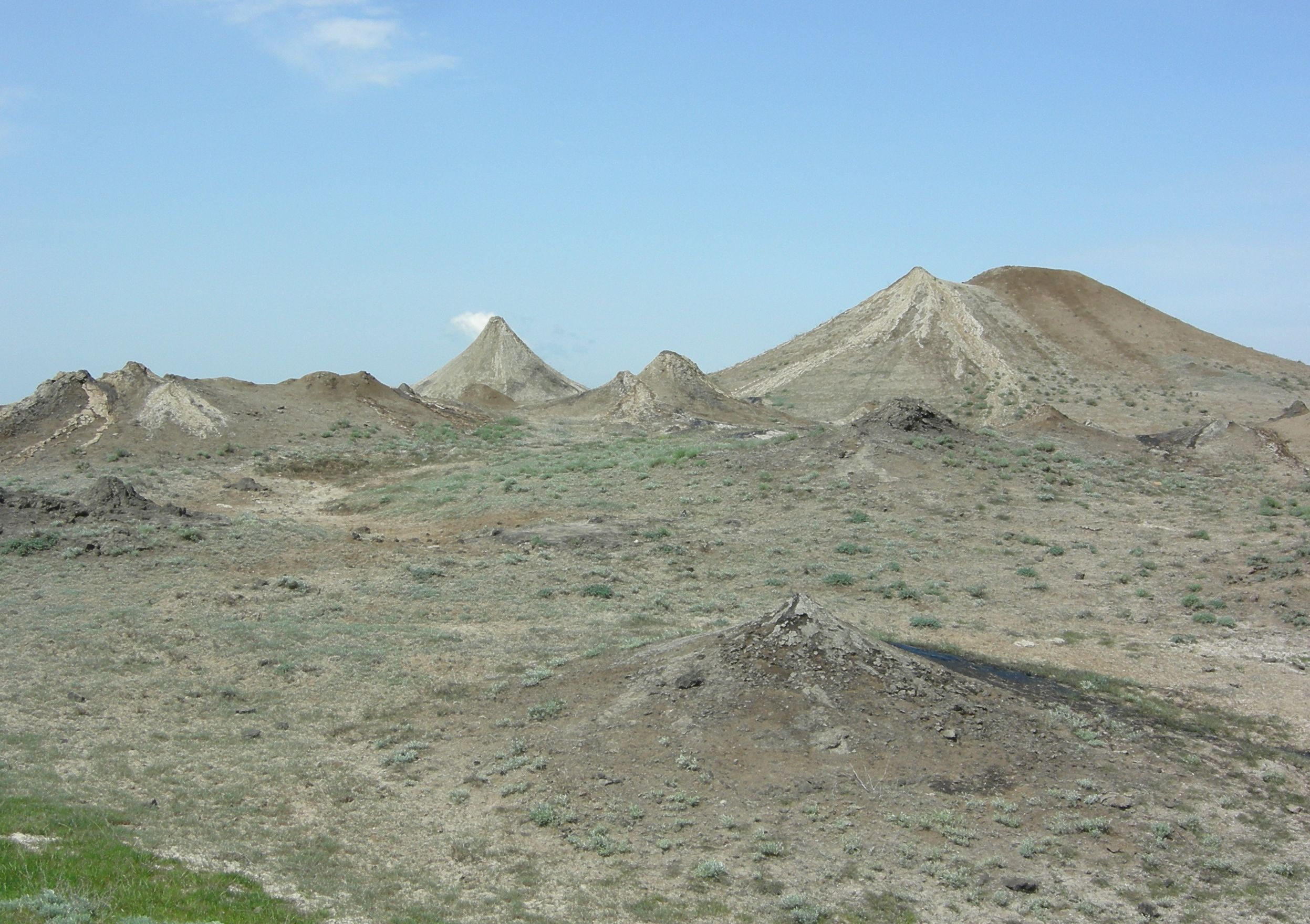
Haciqabul mud volcanoes

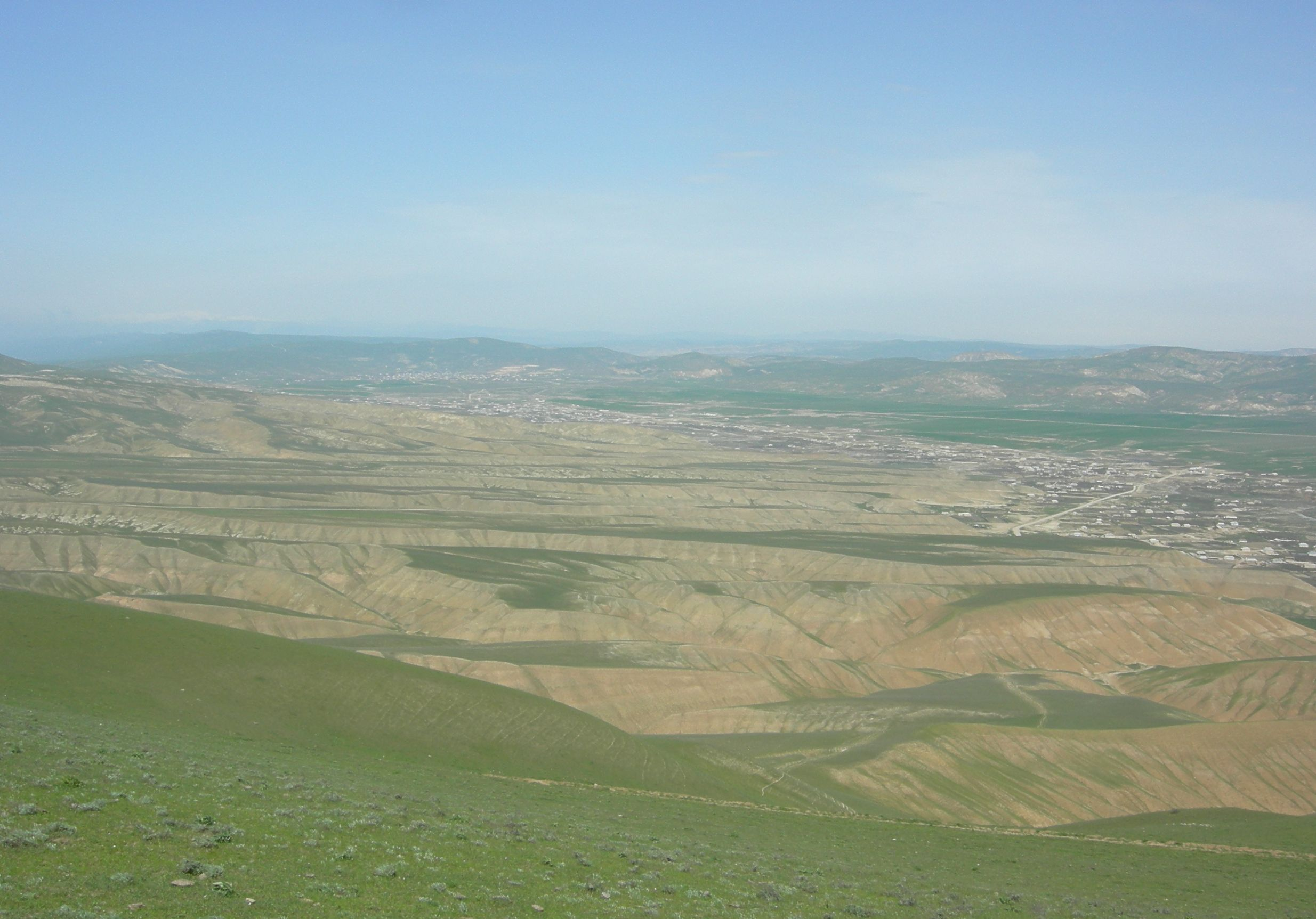
Pirsaat valley
