= Safavid Shirvan =

Province of the Safavid Empire in the Caucasus from 1501 to 1736

Shirvan Velāyat-e Shirvān ولایت شیروان
- 1501–1736
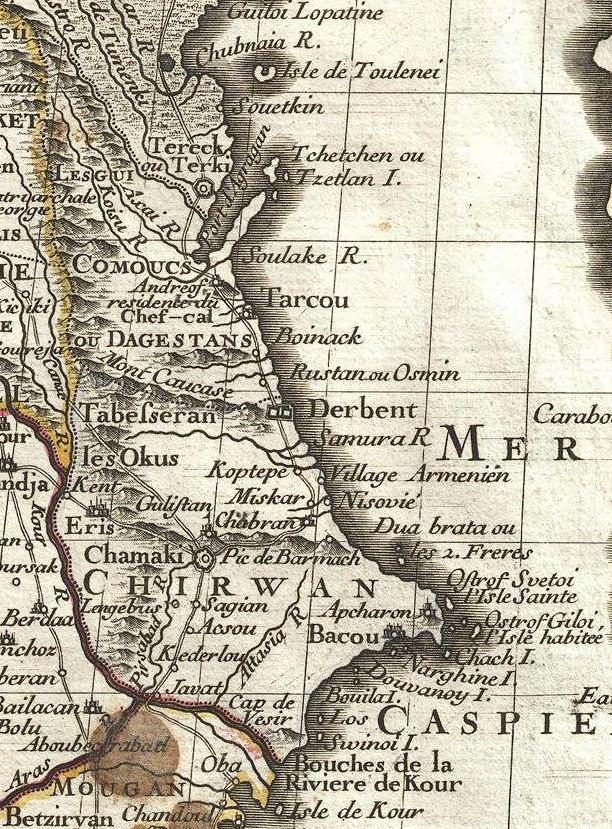
- Status: Province of the Safavid Empire; Under Ottoman occupation (1583–1607)
- Capital: Shamakhi
- Common languages: Azerbaijani, Persian, Armenian, Lezgian
- Government: Province
- Beglarbeg
- History
  - Establishment: 1501
  - Disestablished: 1736
Preceded by	Succeeded by
Shirvanshah	Afsharid Iran
- Today part of: Azerbaijan; Russia

The Shirvan province (Persian: ولایت شیروان, romanized: Velāyat-e Shirvān) was a province founded by the Safavid Empire on the territory of modern Azerbaijan and Russia (Dagestan) between 1501 and 1736 with its capital in the town of Shamakhi.

The province had six administrative jurisdictions; Alpa'ur, Arash-Shaki, Baku, Chemeshgazak-Agdash, Derbent (Darband), Quba-Qolhan, and Saliyan. The capital of Shamakhi had a separate governor, but is not mentioned by the then contemporary historians and geographers to have formed a separate administrative jurisdiction.

Control over Shirvan was firmly held by the Safavids from the time of the subjugation of Shirvan (except for several brief Ottoman intermissions) when eventually the Afsharid ruler of Iran, Nader Shah established firm rule over the area until the area. After his death, the area was divided into various subordinate various khanates, before they were conquered by the Russian Empire from Qajar Iran in the course of the 19th century.

== History ==
Having ended the rule of the Shirvanshahs in 1538, Tahmasp I established Shirvan as an administrative unit of the empire. At the end of the 16th century, the Ottoman General Lala Kara Mustafa Pasha briefly captured Shirvan during the Ottoman–Safavid War (1578–1590) and appointed Özdemiroğlu Osman Pasha as its governor. In 1607, Shah Abbas I invaded Shirvan again and instituted Qizilbash rule over the province. In the early 18th century the Lezgins led by a ruler named Haji Davud invaded Shirvan, they captured and sacked Shamakhi the capital of the region and killed the local ruler Hasan Ali Khan (who was also of Lezgin origins). Haji Davud temporarily formed a Khanate in Shirvan with the help of the recognition of the Ottoman Sultan.After several interstate wars, Shirvan was eventually captured by Nader Shah in 1734 to establish Safavid rule over the province again.

== List of governors ==
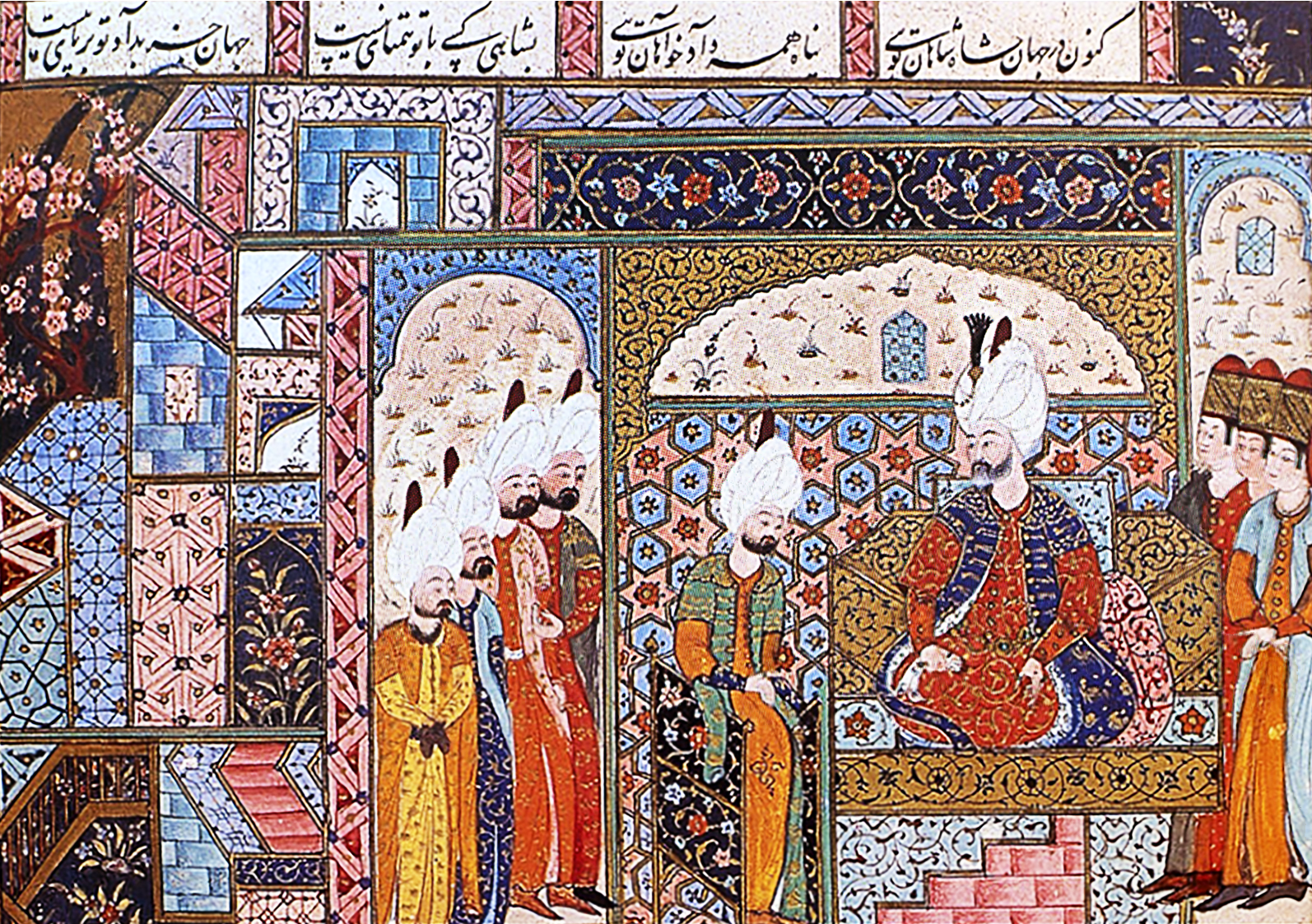
Persian princes Alqas Mirza

Date	Governor
1501	Bahram Beg*
1501-1502	Gazi Beg*
1502	Sultan Mahmud*
1502-1509	Ibrahim II Shaykhshah*
1509-1519	Hossein Beg Laleh
1519-1524	Ibrahim II Shaykhshah*
1523-1535	Khalilullah II*
1535-1538	Shahrukh*
1538-1547	Alqas Mirza
1538-1541	Badr Khan Ustajlu
1538-1543	Ghazi Khan Tekkelu
1543-1547	Badr Khan Ustajlu
1547-?	Ismail Mirza
1547-1549	Shahverdi Sultan
1548-1550	Burhan Ali*^{§}
1549	Mehrab Mirza*^{§}
1549-1550	Qorban Ali Mirza*^{§}
1554	Qasem Mirza*^{§}
1549-1565	Abdollah Khan Ustajlu
1566	Mostafa Beg
1566	Shah Beg Ali
1567	Farrokhzad Beg Qaradaghlu
1567-1576	Aras Khan Rumlu
1577	Abu Torab Soltan Ustajlu
1577	Kavus Mirza*^{§}
1577	Aras Soltan Khan Rumlu
1578	Abu Bakr Mirza*^{§}
1578	Panah Mohammad Khan Dhu'l-Qadr
1578-?	Mohammad Khan Khalifeh Hajjilar Dhu'l-Qadr
1579	Suleiman Khan Ustajlu
1580-1583	Peykar Beg Khan Ziyadoghlu
1583	Khalifeh Ansar Qaradajlu
1604–05	Constantine I of Kakheti
1583-1607	Ottoman occupation
1610-1624	Yusuf Khan
1624-1633	Qazaq Khan Cherkes
1643–1653	Khosrow Soltan Armani
1653	Najafqoli Khan Cherkes
1663–67	Najafqoli Khan Cherkes
1718	Hasan-Ali Khan Daghestani

== See also ==
- Shirvan
- Shirvan (city)
- Shirvan, Iran

== Sources ==
- Akopyan, A. V.; Mosanef, F. (2010). "Safavid coinage of Aresh" (PDF). Journal of the Oriental Numismatic Society. 202: 16–20.
- Floor, Willem M. (2008). Titles and Emoluments in Safavid Iran: A Third Manual of Safavid Administration, by Mirza Naqi Nasiri. Washington, DC: Mage Publishers. pp. 1–337. ISBN 978-1933823232.
