= Alqas Mirza =

Alqās Mīrzā
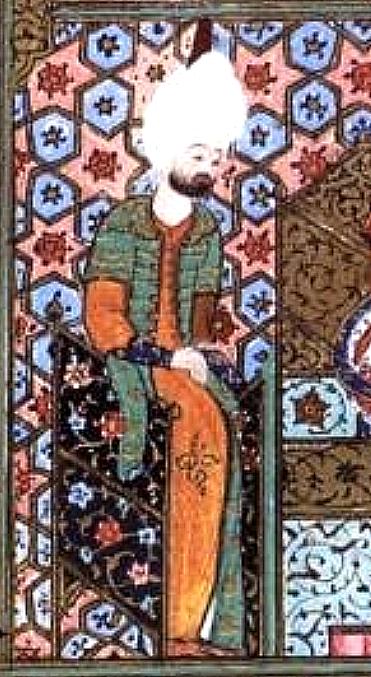
- Alqas Mirza, at the court of Suleiman the Magnificent. Illustration from the Süleymanname (1558)

Governor of Astarabad
- Tenure: 1532/33–1538
- Successor: Sadraddin Khan Ustajlu
- Lala: Badr Khan Ustajlu

Governor of Shirvan
- Tenure: 1538–1547
- Predecessor: Shahrukh of Shirvan as Shirvanshah
- Successor: Ismail Mirza
- Lala: Ghazi Khan Takalu
- Born: 15 March 1516 near Tabriz
- Died: 9 April 1550 (aged 34); Qahqaha fortress, near Khiav (Meshginshahr)
- Spouse: Khadija Soltan Khanum Ustajlu
- Dynasty: Safavid
- Father: Ismail I
- Mother: Khanbegi Khanum Mawsillu
- Religion: Sunni Islam

Abu'l Ghazi Sultan Alqas Mirza (Persian: ابوالقاسم غازی سلطان القاس میرزا), better known as Alqas Mirza (القاس میرزا or Elkaz Mirza; 15 March 1516 – 9 April 1550), was a Safavid prince and the second surviving son of king (shah) Ismail I (r. 1501–1524). In early 1546, with Ottoman help, he staged a revolt against his brother Tahmasp I (r. 1524–1576), who was king at the time.

== Early life ==
Alqas Mirza was born on 15 March 1516 (10 Safar 922 AH) in a winter camp near Tabriz as Shah Ismail's third son. According to a source, his name was a word play on Qisas (retaliation) referring to a desire to beat Ottomans back after Battle of Chaldiran. According to Tāriḵ-e Rawżat al-ṣafā-ye nāṣeri by Reza-Qoli Khan Hedayat, he was born as soon as the news of Selim I's death reached Safavid realm. His mother was Khanbegi khanum Mawsillu, of the Aq Qoyunlu tribe of the Mawsillu, daughter of Sufi Khalil Beg Mawsillu.

His military career started as early as in 1528, participating in Battle of Jam (near Zurabad) against Uzbeks. At the age of 16, he was trusted with the governorship of Astarabad by his brother Tahmasp with Badr Khan Ustajlu as his lala. He was tasked with raising army against his former foe Uzbeks while Tahmasp was fighting Ottomans in west. Later he was sent to conquer Rustamdar province. In 1534-1536, he joined Tahmasp in the fight against Suleiman the Magnificent.

== Conquest of Shirvan ==
Shirvan was in chaos following the death of Khalilullah II in 1535. The Shirvanese nobles brought Shahrukh, his nephew from Gazikumukh Shamkhalate and enthroned him, instead of Khalilullah's half-Safavid son Burhan Ali. This triggered Qalandar revolt, whose leader claimed to be Khalilullah's brother Muhammad and marched on Shahrukh. According to Khurshah ibn Qubad, queen-dowager Parikhan Khanum approved the revolt and sent envoys to Tahmasp, inviting him to invade the country. Although Qalandar was eventually defeated by support from Shamkhalate forces near Salyan and was killed, this was enough excuse for Safavid forces to intervene to "quell disarray". Safavid historian Iskander beg Munshi writing a century later, legitimized Safavid incursion into Shirvan emirs oppressing people and using Shahrukh as a puppet. However, there is some evidence, according to Martin Dickson, Tahmasp already planned to take Shirvan in 1532, which was stalled due to Uzbek invasion.

As a result, in March 1538 Tahmasp I ordered Alqas to move against Shirvan together with his regent Badr Khan, his father-in-law Mantasha Soltan Ustajlu, Sevindik beg Afshar, Yaqub Soltan Qajar, Qara Vali Arapgirlu, Mirza Mohammad Talysh and other emirs. After crossing Kura river with 300 men-strong garrison and 20,000 soldiers and occupying Surkhab (near modern Ərəb, Agdash) and Qabala castles (near modern Çuxur Qəbələ) and moved on to besiege Gulustan Fortress which was being defended by Nimatullah beg. Shahrukh himself was defended in Bughurt Fortress with his wakil Huseyn bey. Siege of the fortress lasted four months. Although neighboring Darvish Muhammad Khan came to the aid of Shirvanshah, he was ambushed by Talysh contingent and retreated. Shirvanshah finally surrendered with his wakil. Letter of the surrender forwarded by Alqas reached Tahmasp on 14 September 1538 in Marand. Gulustan was taken few days later, on 27 September. It was decided for Shahrukh to be sent to Tabriz as hostage on 11 October. Tahmasp subsequently ordered the Bughurt Fortress to be demolished on 19 October and appointed Alqas as first beylerbey of Shirvan, ending 677-year-long independent state of Shirvanshahs.

However, conquest of Shirvan was not complete yet, as Baku and Shaki were still resisting. The latter joined as a vassal state following marriage of Darvish Muhammad Khan to queen-dowager Parikhan Khanum in 1539. Conquest of Baku was entrusted to Ghazi Khan Takalu, who recently deserted from Ottomans and received Salyan, Mahmudabad (near modern Əminli) and Baku as fiefdoms around November 1540.

== Rule in Shirvan ==
Following recall of Badr Khan Ustajlu, Ghazi Khan became new lala of Alqas in 1540/41 following capture of Baku in winter. Ghazi being an adversary of Ustajlu tribe disrupted the balance between tribes and constrained the prince's autonomy. To make matters worse, his brother Ali beg Takalu was appointed as custodian of Ardabil Shrine. However, Ghazi soon started to show rebellious tendencies. Following an order from Tahmasp, Alqas executed Ghazi and his brother Mustafa beg in 1544/45.

Roots of Alqas' further rebellion remain obscure. According to Ahmad Monshi Ghomi, a certain Begoglu Ustajlu wanted to marry Khanbegi Khanum, Alqas' mother and Tahmasp allowed him. As a response, Alqas executed him. Walter Posch argues that after execution of Ghazi, Alqas received his soldiers and with Shirvanshah treasury and robust economy, he felt powerful enough to act de-facto independent. Disgruntled Shirvanian nobility also favored Alqas. He soon stopped tabarra curses and removed Safavid qadis from Shirvan. Although Matrakçı Nasuh saw this as a sign of conversion to Sunni view, he was probably trying to appease his new Shirvanian subjects.

Soon in 1545, Tahmasp sent an envoy from Qazvin named Ali agha Akhcha Sakal Urganch oghlu and demanded execution of Alqas' Shirvanian vizier Sayyid Mir Azizullah Shirvani. Alqas refused to carry out order, claiming that he couldn't shed blood of a sayyid. Brothers tentatively reconciled however, following an intermediation by Alqas' mother and son in May–June 1546. Alqas agreed to provide 1000 tomans and 1000 horsemen every year as a tribute, join Tahmasp's upcoming campaign to Georgia and execute Shirvanian nobles. According to Matrakçı Nasuh, this request was refused again. Enraged Tahmasp recalled him to court, meanwhile Alqas sent a rider to Ottoman Empire for aid. The envoy was detained by Levan of Kakheti and his letters were forwarded to shah. However, Safavid sources agree that Alqas was in agreement with his brother and obeyed him.

After the oath of allegiance in December 1546 - January 1547, Alqas was ordered to attack the Circassians. From Tahmasp's viewpoint, him being in Georgia prevented Alqas from contacting Ottomans. Tahmasp was to support Bagrat III of Imereti against Kaikhosro II Jaqeli and Ottomans. Meanwhile, Alqas moved against Kabarda with 6,000 men, negotiating with Tabasaran and Gazikumukh to pass through their territory. However, he couldn't do much because of cold in mountainous region. Several officiers, including Parvandi agha Rumlu and Shahnazar beg, brother of Darvish Muhammad fell in battle while fighting against Circassians. Managed to kill only 600 Circassians, he was forced to retreat to Derbent.

Meanwhile, Tahmasp encamped at Yevlakh and sent Ibrahim Khan Zulqadar, Husaynjan Soltan Rumlu, Gokcha Soltan Qajar, Shahverdi Sultan, Khwaja Basan, and five thousand horsemen to take Alqas' family hostage. Dawlatyar, steward of Alqas' ordu, hearing this took the family to Gulustan Fortress. Another contingent under Suleyman bey Chalabi Chepni with 600 men was sent to besiege Derbent. Alqas responded by sending Muhammad bey Afshar, as well as Deli and Saru Qaytmas brothers. Muhammad bey was defeated near Qabala and some officers of Alqas was imprisoned or killed. Unable to withstand the Shah's forces, Alqas fled to Khinalug but had to face Safavid army on the banks of Samur river. Defeated and wounded, Alqas fled to Ottoman empire via Gazikumukh-Crimea-Constantinople route in 1547 with 40 followers. Despite Alqas fleeing, Gulustan Fortress continued to resist, its commander Dawlatyar killing Safavid emir Hamza beg Kashani. Fortress was taken after three months of siege. Derbent also fell after its defender Khanbegi Khanum surrendered. Tahmasp granted Shirvan to his son, future shah Ismail II with Gokcha Soltan as his regent.

== In exile ==
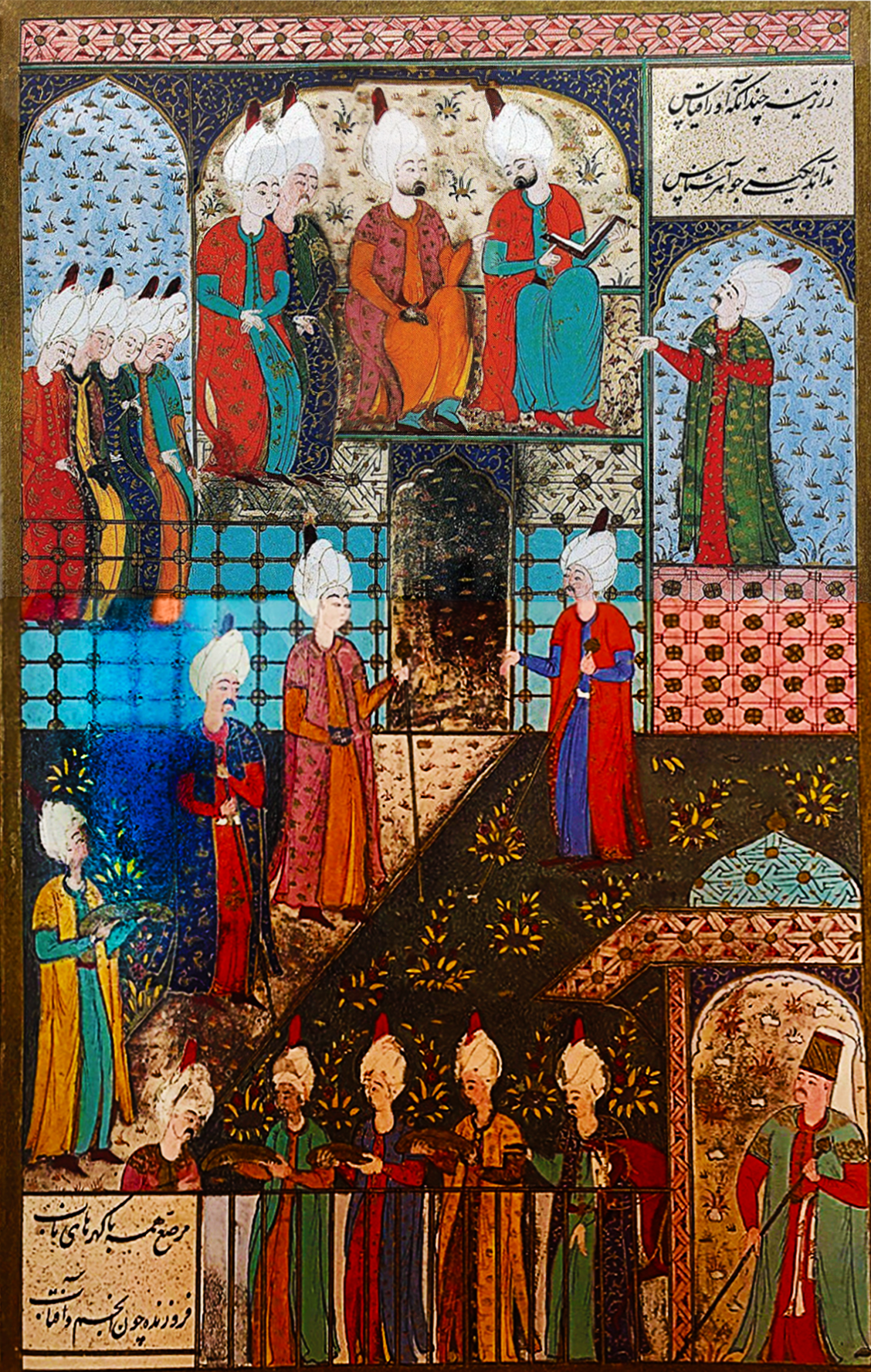
Rüstem Pasha (top-center) watching the arrival of Alqas Mirza’s gifts to Süleyman’s court. Süleymanname (1558)

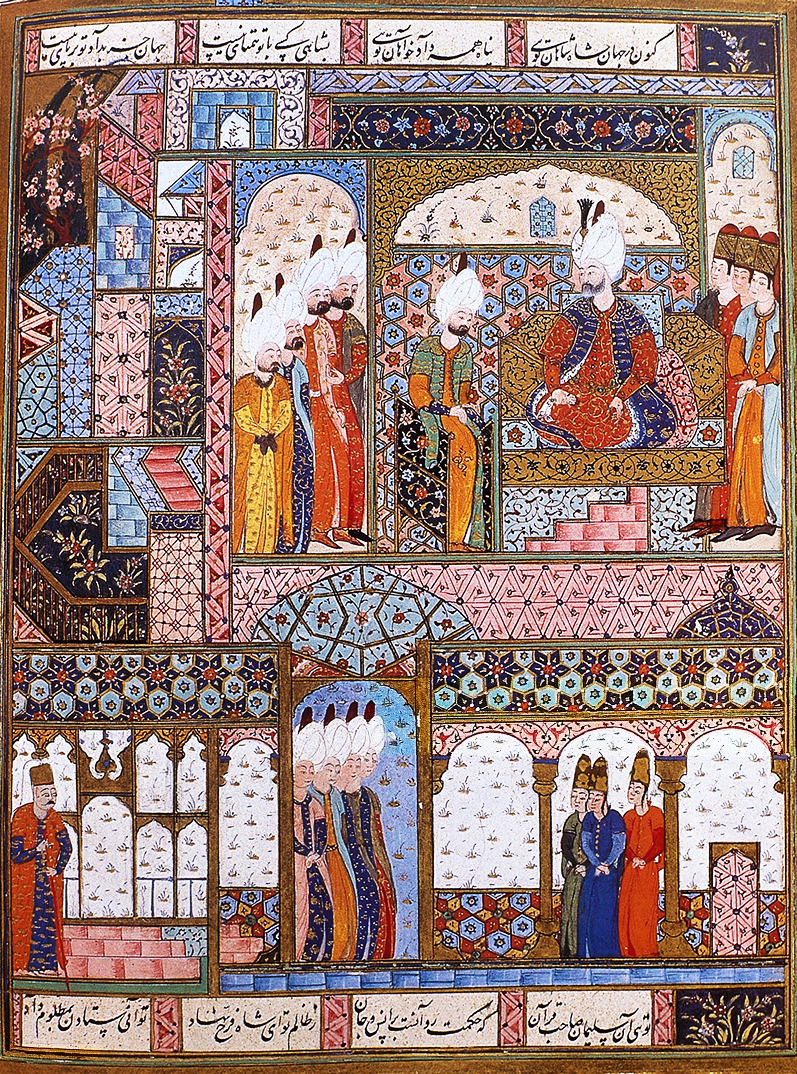
Reception of Alqas Mirza by Süleyman in 1547. Süleymanname (1558)

At Constantinople in 1547, he contacted the Ottoman sultan Suleiman, explaining his reason of departure from Iran, as well as his desire to return there as an Ottoman client. Upon hearing this, Suleiman hastily moved from Edirne to meet the exiled Alqas, who promised strong Qizilbash support if Suleiman might help him, and he may have converted to Sunnism.

Soon, Alqas with support from Suleiman, marched on his former country. Aided by Ulama Pasha Takalu, a renegade Safavid, now beylerbey of Erzurum, he occupied Khoy on 27 July 1548 with 40,000 men. Alqas later defeated Safavids near Marand and encamped near Eyshabad. However, promised Qizilbash support never came and Suleiman was forced to retreat to Van. Still supporting Alqas, Suleiman sent him to conquer Iraq-e Ajam. As a result, Alqas successfully captured Hamadan and seized his brother Bahram Mirza's family on 5 November 1548. Going further, he conquered Qom, raided Ray, besieged Isfahan, captured Izad-Khast Castle, went as far as Shiraz before returning to Behbahan. Alqas finally returned to Ottoman territories on 19 January 1549. Fearing of his failure and imminent punishment, Alqas appealed to Kurdish chief Surkhab of Ardalan who turned Alqas over to Bahram Mirza on 1 October 1549.

== Death and family ==
Alqas was delivered to Hasan bey Yuzbashi and was incarcerated at Qahqaha fortress alongside his sons. Six months later, Alqas was thrown from the ramparts of the fortress to his death on 9 April 1550 by Hasan Yuzbashi, whose father was Begoglu Ustajlu.

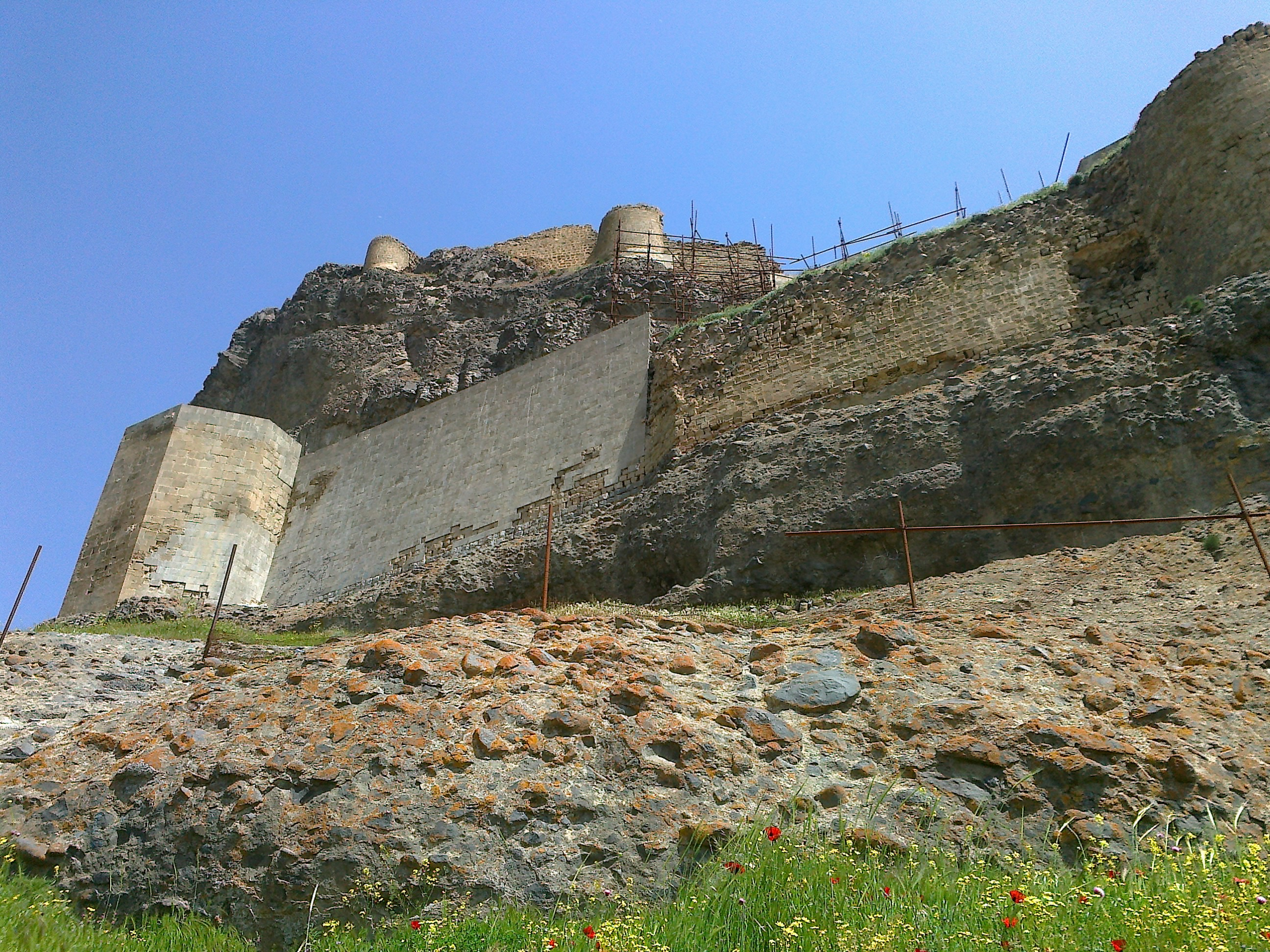
Alqas Mirza was imprisoned and killed in the Qahqaheh Castle in 1550

He was married to Khadija Soltan Khanum, daughter of Mantasha Soltan Ustajlu. He had two sons with her - Soltan Ahmad and Farrukh Mirza. Khadija was remarried to Badr Khan Ustajlu in 1552. She was remarried to Sayyed Abolqasem Razavi in 1559. Both Soltan Ahmad and Farrukh Mirza were killed alongside Sam Mirza and his children in 1568.

== Legacy ==
Sadiqi Beg describes him as having a poetic temperament. Alqas's interest in the visual arts is evidenced by two illuminated manuscripts likely completed for him in Shirvan. His major cultural contributions went to the Ottomans, with his gift of royal Safavid treasures remaining in Topkapi Palace, influencing palace artisans. In Constantinople, he left his nishanji, Fethullah Arif who authored Shahnama-yi Al-i Osman, as well as his court librarian Aflatun Shirvani. Tahmasp likened him to Shahrukh in his memories as a constant companion as he was to Timur. "I loved him more than any of my brothers and sons. [...] The stupid man rebelled for no reason. [...] After his death, the world became calm," he wrote.

== See also ==
- Ottoman–Safavid War (1532–55)

== Sources ==
- Mitchell, Colin P. (2015). "Alqās Mīrzā". In Fleet, Kate; Krämer, Gudrun; Matringe, Denis; Nawas, John; Rowson, Everett (eds.). Encyclopaedia of Islam (3rd ed.). Brill Online. ISSN 1873-9830.
- Necipogulu, Gulru; Roxburgh, David J. (2000). Muqarnas: An Annual on the Visual Culture of the Islamic World, Volume 17. BRILL. pp. 149–. ISBN 978-9004116696.
- Posch, Walter (2013). Osmanisch-safavidische Beziehungen 1545-1550: Der Fall Alḳâs Mîrzâ [Ottoman-Safavid relations 1545-1550: The case of Alḳâs Mîrzâ] (in German). Austrian Academy of Sciences. doi:10.2307/j.ctt1vw0pgd. ISBN 978-3-7001-7308-3.
- Şahin, Kaya (2013). Empire and Power in the Reign of Süleyman: Narrating the Sixteenth-Century Ottoman World. Cambridge: Cambridge University Press. ISBN 978-1107034426.
- Savory, R.M. (1960). "Alḳāṣ Mīrzā". In Gibb, H. A. R.; Kramers, J. H.; Lévi-Provençal, E.; Schacht, J.; Lewis, B. & Pellat, Ch. (eds.). The Encyclopaedia of Islam, Second Edition. Volume I: A–B. Leiden: E. J. Brill. OCLC 495469456.
