= Shirvanshahs' Palace Mausoleum =

Historic 15th century monument in Baku, Azerbaijan

Shirvanshahs' palace mausoleum
- Persian: آرامگاه کاخ شروان‌شاهان; Azerbaijani: Şirvanşahlar sarayı türbəsi
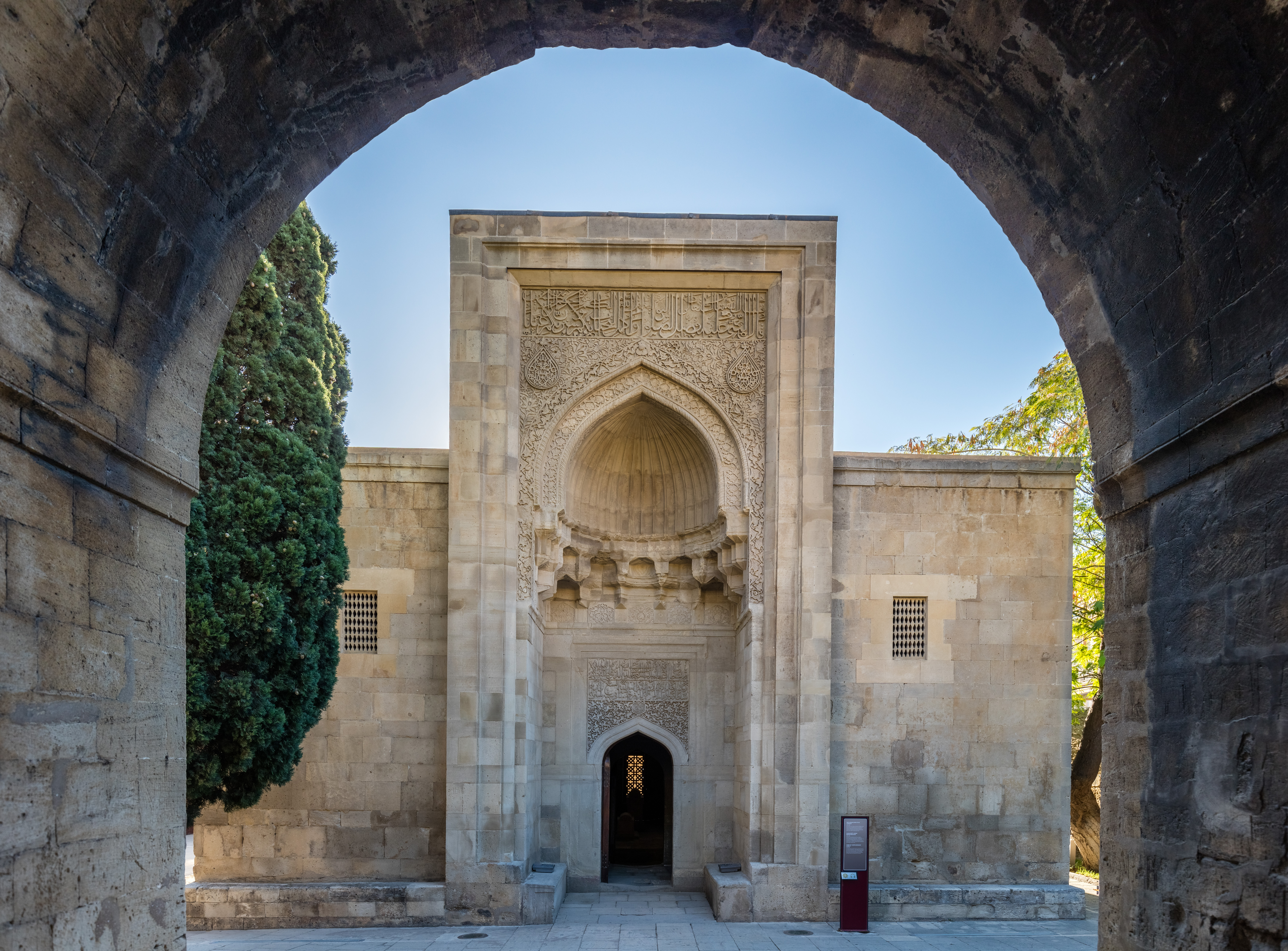

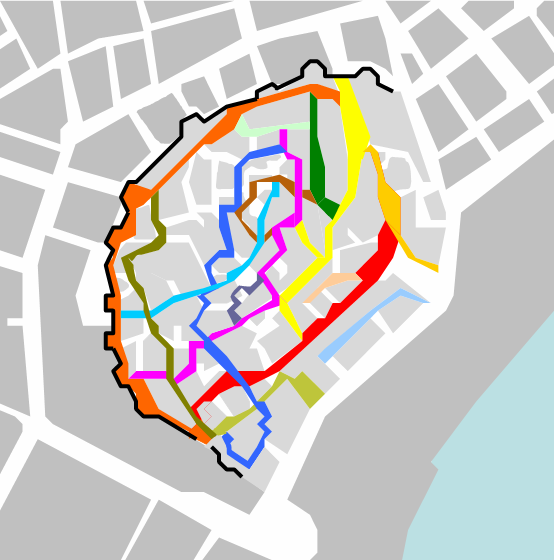
- Location within Streets in Old City, Baku, Azerbaijan

General information
- Type: Mausoleum
- Architectural style: Shirvan-Absheron
- Location: Gala turn, 76, Old City, Baku, Azerbaijan
- Coordinates: 40°21′59″N 49°50′00″E
- Completed: 1435–1436
- Client: Khalilullah I

Design and construction
- Architect: Muhammad Ali

UNESCO World Heritage Site
- Official name: Shirvanshahs' palace mausoleum
- Type: Cultural
- Criteria: iv
- Designated: 2000 (24th session)
- Part of: Walled City of Baku with the Shirvanshahs' Palace and Maiden Tower
- Reference no.: 958
- Region: Europe/Asia
- Endangered: 2003–2009

Shirvanshahs' Palace Mausoleum (Persian: آرامگاه کاخ شروان‌شاهان, Azerbaijani: Şirvanşahlar sarayı türbəsi) or Tomb of the Shirvanshahs' family (Persian: آرامگاه خاندان شروان‌شاهان, Azerbaijani: Şirvanşahların ailə türbəsi) is a historical monument of the 15th century. Located in Old City, it is a part of the Palace of the Shirvanshahs complex. The mausoleum is one of three buildings in the courtyard of the complex, along with the palace mosque and the palace bath house, all build by the Iranian Shirvanshahs.

The monument was also registered as a national architectural landmark by the decision of the Cabinet of Ministers of the Republic of Azerbaijan dated August 2, 2001, No. 132. The mausoleum also forms part of the UNESCO World Heritage-listed Palace of the Shirvanshahs.

== History ==
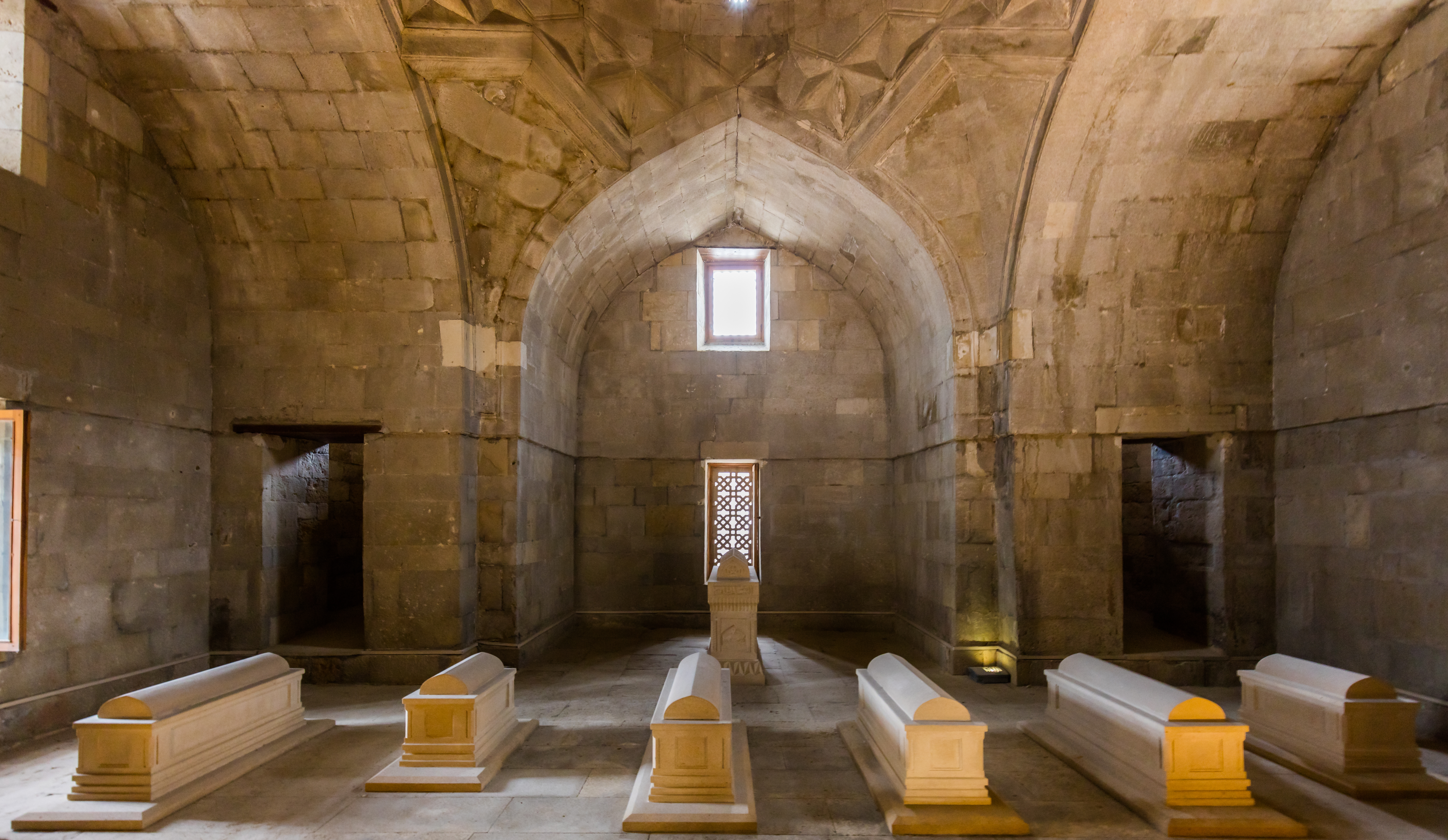
Tombs inside of the mausoleum

The entrance inscription provides information about the history and architecture of the building. It reads: "The defender of the religion, the man of the Prophet, the great Sultan, Shirvanshah Khalilullah—may God preserve his kingdom and reign—ordered this tomb built for his mother and seven-year-old son. May Allah have mercy on them. It was built in 839 AH (1435–1436 CE)."

In 1954, the orientalist A.A. Alesgerzade deciphered these inscriptions on the portal. Other inscriptions are quotations from the Qur’an. On the medallion that decorates the portal, there is an inscription that can only be read with a mirror. It names the architect of the monument: "Allah, architect Muhammad Ali.” Since architects were forbidden to inscribe their names openly on buildings, they encoded them in this way.

The later use of the mausoleum as a madrasa worsened the condition of the graves.. During the archeological excavations carried out in 1947, six tombs were discovered below the floor level.

=== Burials ===
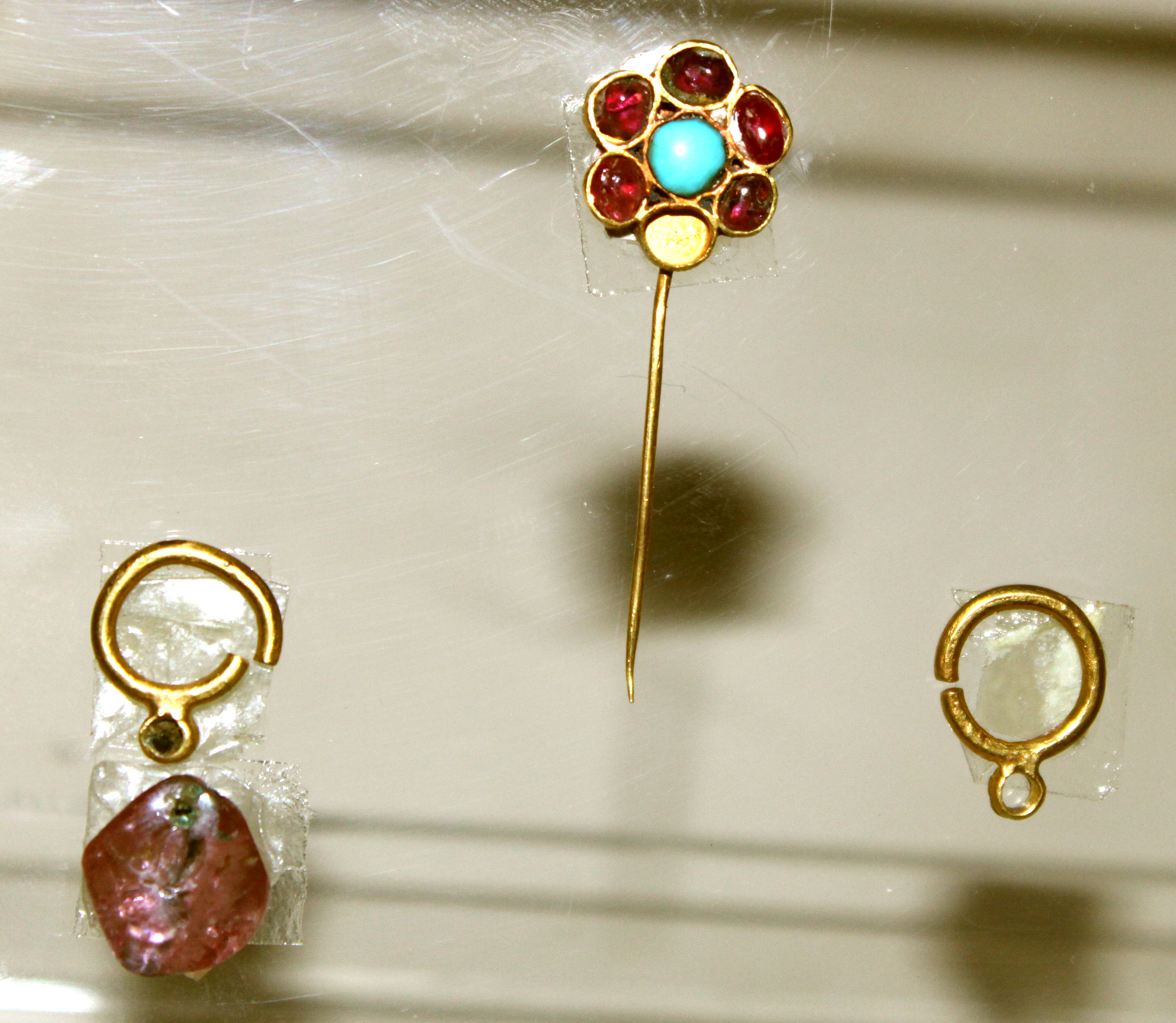
Golden pins and earrings found in the graves

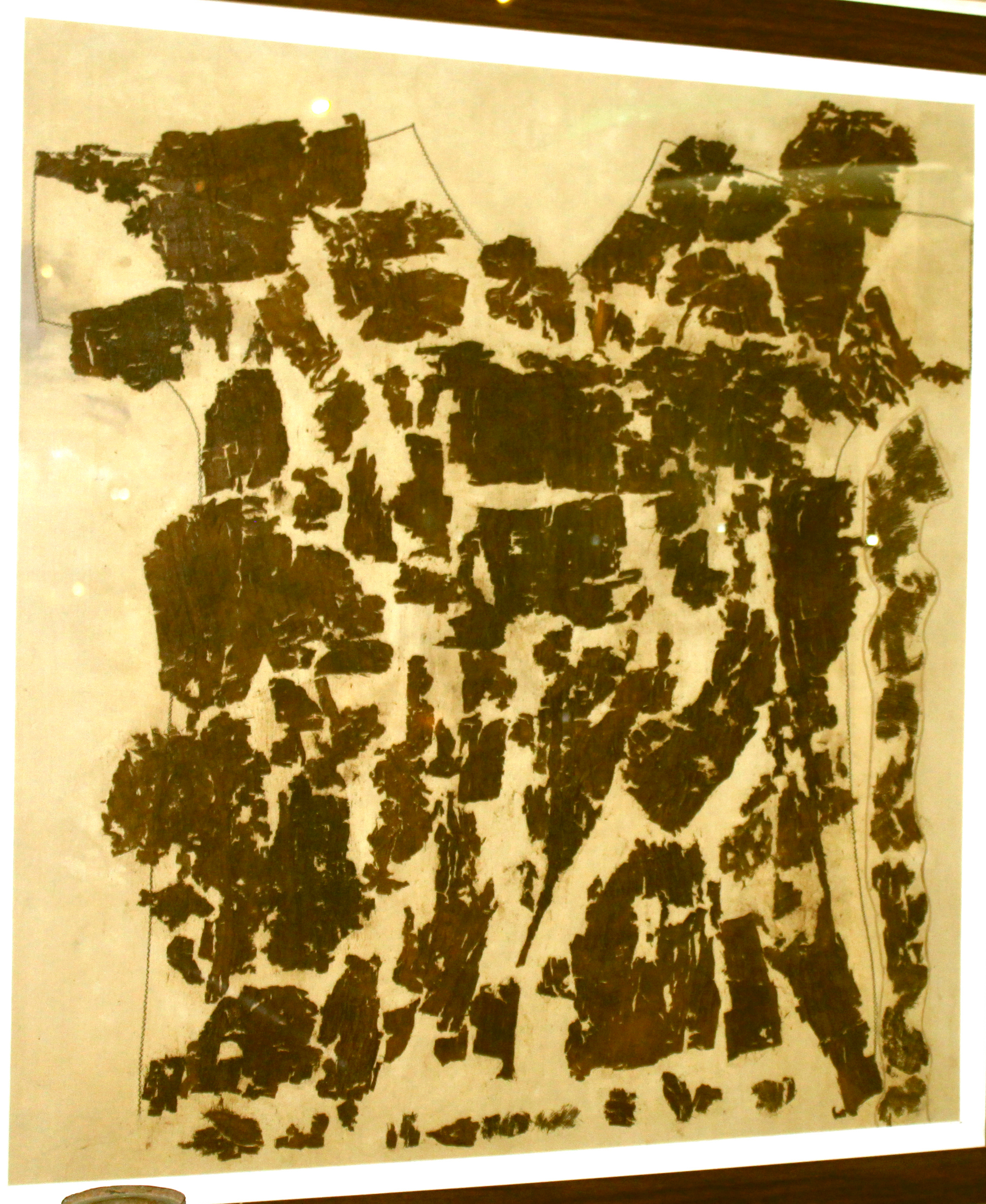
The remains of linen shroud found in the first tomb

According to the inscriptions on the entrance, it is clear that the mausoleum was built for the mother and son of Shirvanshah Khalilullah. Nevertheless, there were buried other members of the Shirvanshahs’ family. During excavations, stone plaques were discovered beneath the dismantled floor. These plaques were used to cover 7 graves. Only in five graves bone remains were found, although the other two were empty.

The 15th-century historian Khwandamir wrote in his work, Habib al-Siyar that Ismail I, the ruler of Safavids promised to burn bones of Shirvanshahs family to ash as an insult and to take vengeance of his father and grandfather. During the capture of Baku by Safavids in 1501, two graves were opened, and the bones inside were removed. The other five graves weren't touched.

In his praises, qasidas, ghazals, the court poet Badr Shirvani mentioned and described those buried in the tombs. He was one of the most famous poets of Shirvan in late 14th-early 15th centuries. In his collection of works, Badr indicated the names and birthdates of the persons who were buried in the mausoleum.

In the first tomb the son of Shirvanshah Farrukh Yamin of 6–7 years old, was buried. Hair remains on the skull and chest of the corpse. During cleaning of the bones, remnants of the shroud were determined. According to one of the praises, the son of the Shirvanshah (1435–1442) died at the age of seven.

The thinness of the teeth and bones suggests that the second grave belonged to an elderly woman. In one of the praises, the name of the mother of the Shirvanshah were shown as Bika and it was noted that she was an influential woman who died in 1435–1436 (Hijri 839).

In the third grave Khanika khanim, wife of Shirvanshah Shahrukh was buried. Badr Shirvani used to note her name in his works.

Sheikh Salah, two year old son of the Shirvanshah, was buried in the fourth tomb. He lived in 1443–1445 (Hijri 847–849). Inside the grave, fragments of glazed ceramics and a candelabrum were found.

The fifth tomb belongs to Ibrahim II (1432), who died at the age of 19. Silk remnants, blue beads, and a golden pin with a needle with a length of 36 cm were found in the grave. On the pin, there was a turquoise and six sapphire gems.

On the opposite side of the entrance, a large skeleton measuring 2.10 meters was discovered. That is believed to be the grave of Khalilullah I. A comb and a gold earring were found in the site.

== Architectural features ==
=== General planning and construction ===
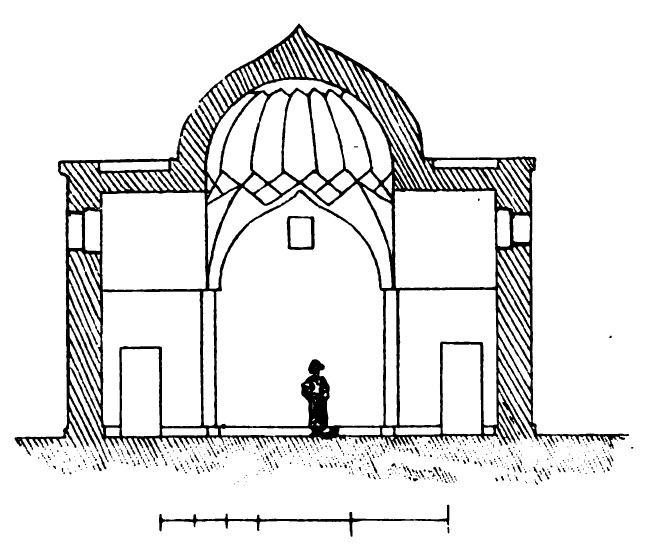
Cross-section of the monument

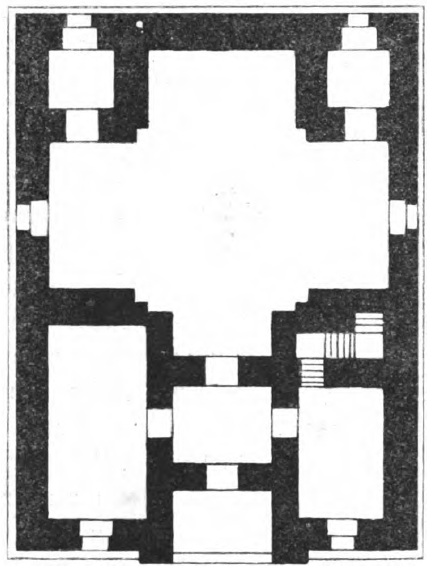
Plan of the mausoleum

The only entrance to the tomb is the portal on the main facade. On the right and left sides of the corridor there are two small rooms. A door is opened to the corridor from each of these rooms. It is supposed that these rooms used to belong to religious figures. From the corridor, visitors enter the main hall—the crypt. The hall is cruciform in the plan. The middle part of it is covered with a stone dome. The dome is fixed to the roof and stone walls.

On the opposite side of the door, between the branches of the cross, there are two small rooms inside the thick stone walls. These are thought to have been used as cells or storerooms for tomb items. The external side of the dome covering upper part of the middle of the hall were decorated with glazed tiles. However, those tiles have not survived.

On the upper part of the tympanum ornament on the stalactite dome there is a zone consisting of inscriptions with religious characters, and on the tympanums there are medallions on both sides, which is written internally. To reduce differences with other surrounding ornaments, the letters of the writings were specially scaled and styled. The inscription on the entrance door of the portal shows that the mausoleum was built by Shirvanshah Khalilullah I for his mother and son in Hijri 839 (1435–1436 CE).

Tectonics of architectural volumes dominate the interior. Here appears the artistic style and architectural techniques implemented by the architect Ali.

Portal and dome of the mausoleum
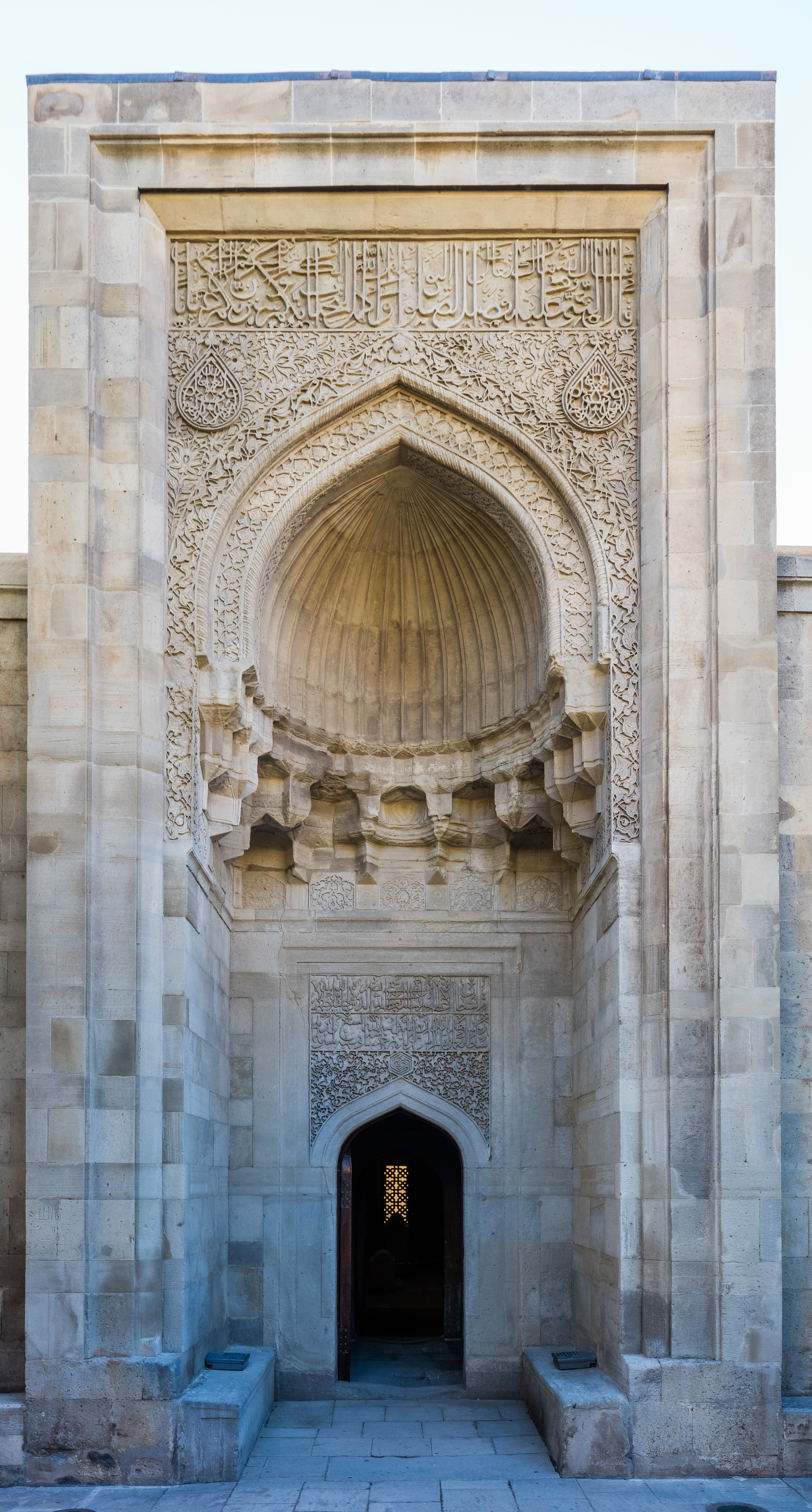
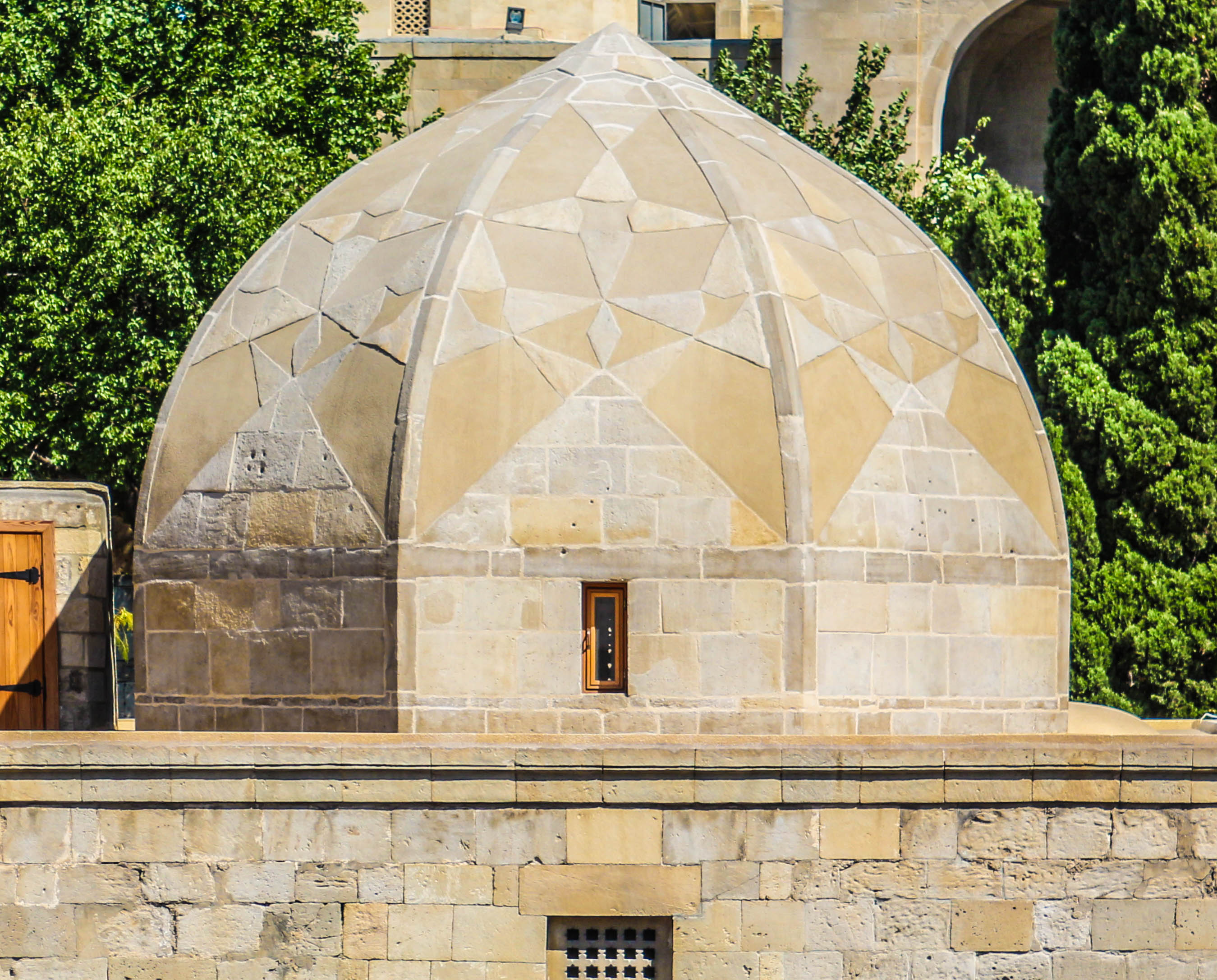

=== Decoration of the portal and facade ===
The portal repeats the composition of the Divankhane in the Palace of the Shirvanshahs complex, but in comparison it is more simply executed. The stalactite dome consists of four stalactites, the side walls are smooth, only the tympanums of the arches on the entrance door are with ornaments, and on its upper parts two lines of inscriptions are etched.

A hexagonal figure is included in the ornaments of the tympanums on the entrance door. Inside of them, the word "Ali" is repeated six times vividly. The portal is about half a meter from the wall. In front of this ledge there is a pavement which plays the role of a bench for people, extending all over the main facade and which is inside the portal. This structure is characteristic for most of the buildings constructed during that era.

At the top of the portal, the 92nd verse of Surah Yusuf (Qur’an 12:92) is carved: “Allah, the greatest, said: "Today Allah will forgive you, for he is the most merciful of all.”

== See also ==
- Mausoleum of Seyid Yahya Bakuvi
- Shirvanshahs' Bath-House

== Literature ==
- Fərhadoğlu, Kamil (2006). İçərişəhər. Bakı: Şərq-Qərb nəşriyyatı, AMEA Arxeologiya və Etnoqrafiya İnstitutu. p. 256.
- Fətullayev-Fiqarov, Şamil (2013). Bakının memarlıq ensiklopediyası. Bakı: Şərq-Qərb, Azərbaycan Respubliksı Memarlar İttifaqı. p. 528.
- S. Dadaşov, M. Useynov (1955). Bakının memarlıq abidələri. Bakı: Azərbaycan SSR Elmlər Akademiyası Nəşriyyatı. p. 42.
