= Galeyi Beygurt =

- Azerbaijani: Qaleyi Bəyqurt
- Location within Azerbaijan

General information
- Status: ruins have remained
- Type: Fortress
- Architectural style: Architectural school of Shirvan-Absheron
- Location: Galeybughurd village, Shamakhi, Azerbaijan
- Coordinates: 40.783725°N 48.562232°E
- Completed: XII-XV centuries

Technical details
- Material: Limestone

Galeyi Beygurt (Azerbaijani: Qaleyi Bəyqurt), also known as Galey-Bughurt (Azerbaijani: Qəley-Buğurt) or simply Bughurt fortress (Azerbaijani: Buğurt qalası) is a historic monument located 20 km north-east of the center of Shamakhi city.

== Location ==
The fortress is located at the summit of the mountain near Galeybughurd village and 1,600 meters above the sea level. The mountain, where the fortress is located is surrounded by Maiden Tower and Cangi mountain from the south, Tana mountain and the Alchalı Pir forest from the east, Mount Ulguc from the north and Galadarasi from the west.

== History ==
It is unknown when the fortress was built. It is believed that the history of the fortress dates back to XIII century. It is often referred to in the sources of the XV century.

=== During Shirvanshahs ===
The fortress was a shelter for Shirvanshah during Mongol conquest. It was also used during the period of Shirvanshah Kequbad and Kavus. When Shah Ismayil attacked Shirvan in 1509, Shirvanshah Shaykhshah was defended at Bughurt fortress. In 1518 the Safavid armies attacked Shirvan under the leadership of Alqas Mirza Safavid. Shahrukh and lawyer Hussein Bey, who retreated into the Bughurt fortress, could resist the Safavids for several months. Also, at that time, the treasury of the Shirvanshahs was kept at the Bughurt fortress.

=== During Safavids ===
According to Iskandar Munshi’s writings, during these wars both Gulustan and Bugurt fortresses was destroyed by the order of Tahmasp. During march of Suleiman the Magnificent to Shirvan, Abdollah Khan was beylerbey of Shirvan. At this time, the head of the Turkish troops, Gasim Bey used Bugurt fortress as a defensive point. It proves Iskandar Munshi's claim wrong. The fortress was until late XVII century.

== See also ==
- Architecture of Azerbaijan
