= Farrukh Yasar II =

Farrukh Yassar II
- Shah of Shirvan
- Reign: 1527
- Coronation: 1527
- Predecessor: Khalilullah II
- Successor: Khalilullah II
- Born: ? Baku
- Died: ? Baku
- Issue: Shahrukh
Names
- Farrukh Yassar
- House: House of Shirvanshah
- Father: Ibrahim II Sheykhshah
- Religion: Sunni

Farrukh Yassar II was the brief 42nd shah of Shirvan.

== Reign ==
Not much is known about his reign; his existence was disputed until a 1934 discovery of a hoard of 906 silver Shirvanshah coins in Salyan. It was known that his son was invited by local nobility to succeed Khalilullah II. He was probably forced to flee to Dagestan, upon rebelling against his brother Khalilullah II. However, another numismatic evidence shows that he somehow managed to mint coins with his name on them.

Farrukh Yasar II House of Shirvanshah Born: ? Died: ?
Regnal titles
Preceded by Khalilullah II	Shirvanshah; 1527	Succeeded by Khalilullah II
