= Kalakhana tombs =

- Kələxana türbələri (Azerbaijani)
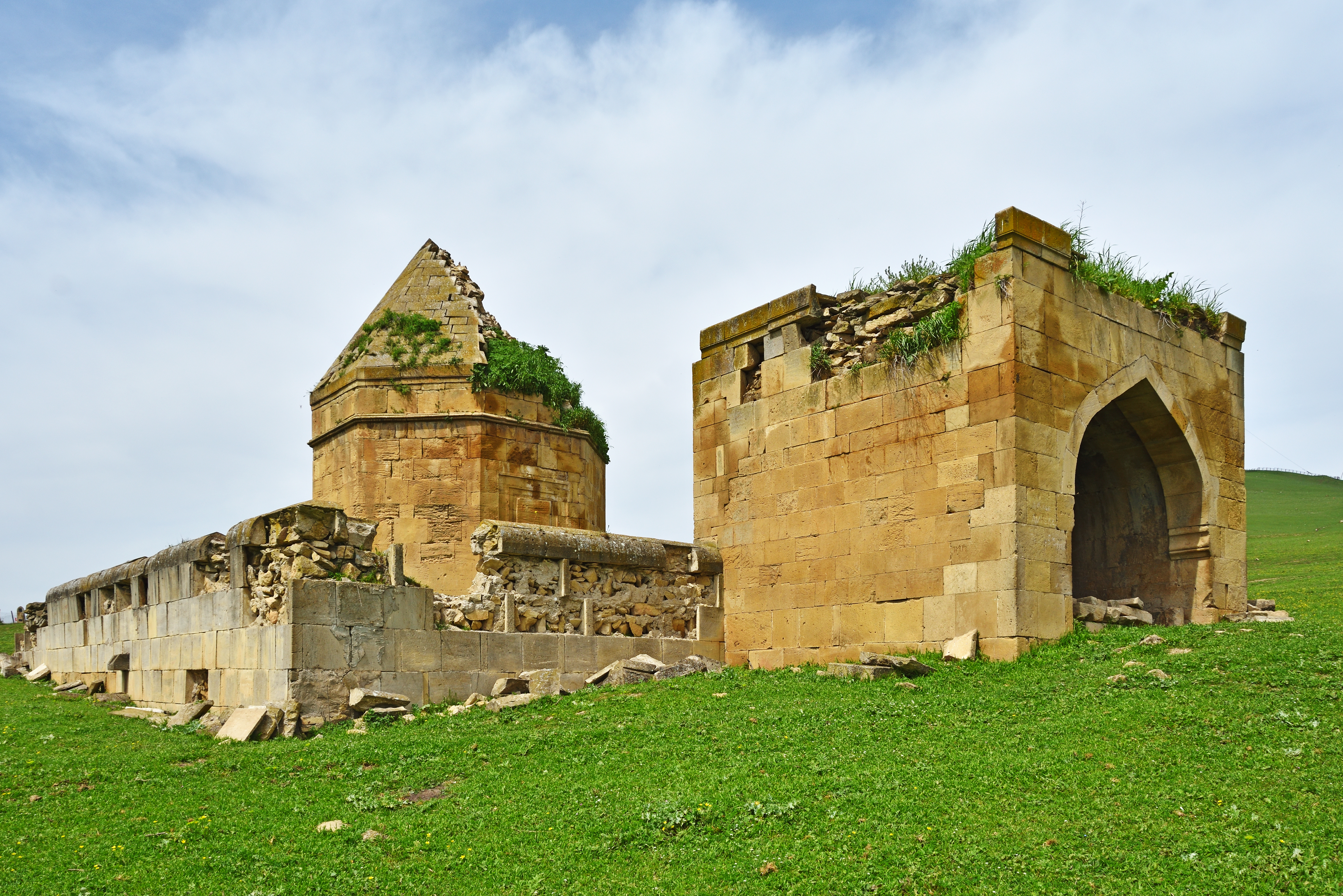
- One of the tombs within the complex

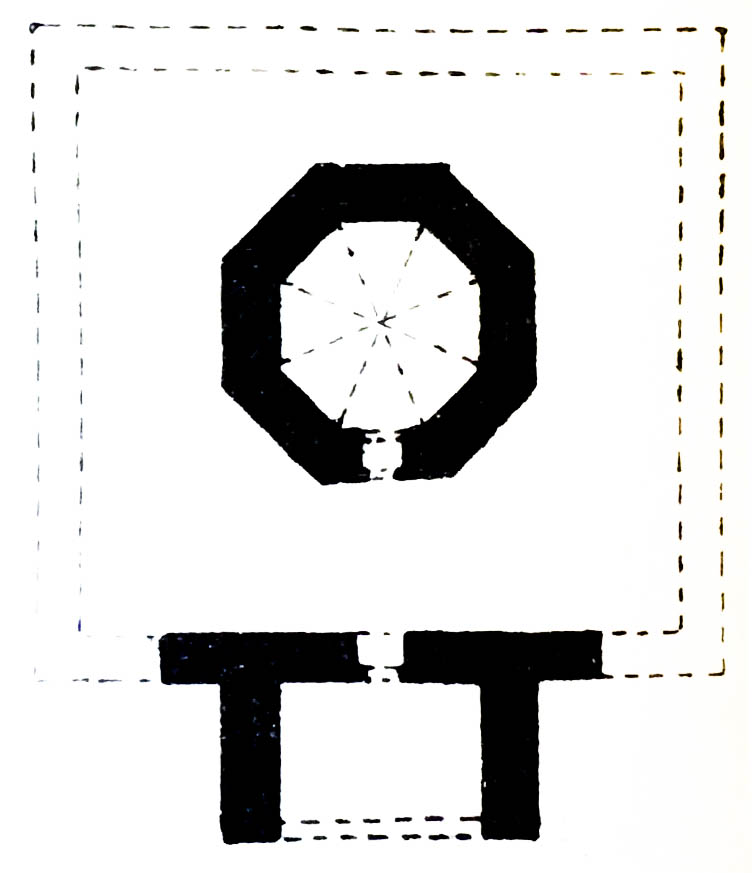
- Archaeological map of westernmost tomb

- Kalakhana tombs in Shamakhi, Azerbaijan
- 40.590543°N 48.601855°E
- Type: tomb
- Location: near Kalakhana, Shamakhi District, Azerbaijan

History
- Built: 17th century

Site notes
- Area: 3.5 hectares (8.6 acres)
- Architect: Amir Ali oglu Abdulazim
- Architectural style: Shirvan-Absheron
- Governing body: Government of Azerbaijan

Kalakhana tombs (Azerbaijani: Kələxana türbələri), is a complex of tombs located 6 kilometres (3.7 mi) north of the Azerbaijani city of Shamakhi, near Kalakhana (present-day Shahriyar). Eight of the nine tombs within the complex have survived, one of which has been severely damaged. Other tombs are still in good condition, and some are undamaged.

Only one of the tombs has an inscription on it. It contains information about the date of construction of the monument and the identity of the person buried there. It is known from this inscription that the tomb was built in 1663 or 1664 by the architect Amir Ali oglu Abdulazim.

== History ==
Until the end of the 19th century, the Kalakhana tombs were rarely covered in the scientific literature, and the architectural features of the monuments within the complex were not thoroughly studied. Eight of the nine tombs within the complex have survived, one of which has been severely damaged. Other tombs are still in good condition, and some are undamaged. Remains of the defensive walls surrounding the three tombs have also survived. However, only one of them is in a position to allow a scientific restoration of the original appearance of the complex.

According to Cornelis de Bruijn, five of the nine tombs are surrounded by walls with portal entrances. The farthest tomb was surrounded by a double wall. The archaeologist writes that there were 5 graves in the first tomb and 3 graves in the second tomb. He writes that although at first glance less than nine tombs can be seen, the hill in which the tombs are located is called the seven domes. De Bruijn also notes that there was a castle on the site of the tomb complex and a spring nearby.

Kalakhana tombs are one of the unique complexes among the architectural monuments of Medieval Azerbaijan to be built within a short time of period. According to the Soviet–Azerbaijani architect and critic Abdulvahab Salamzadeh, one of the main facts proving that the tombs were constructed within a few years is that the German traveler Adam Olearius, who visited the region in 1636, did not provide any information on the tombs. However, in a book published by Cornelis de Bruijn, who visited Shirvan in the early 18th century, each of the nine tombs were already depicted. Considering that on one of the tomb inscriptions the Hijri date of 1074 (1663 or 1664 with the Gregorian calendar) other tombs may have been built in the same period, possibly by the same architect.
