= Qasem Mirza =

- Self-declared Shah of Shirvan
- Reign: 1554
- Coronation: 1554
- Predecessor: Gurban Ali
- Successor: Kavus Mirza
- Born: ? ?
- Died: ? ?
Names
- Qasem Mirza
- House: House of Shirvanshah
- Father: Khalilullah II
- Religion: Sunni Islam

Qasem Mirza was the self-declared Shah of Shirvan after the death of Gurban Ali.

== Life ==
He was a member of the Shirvanshahs. He escaped to the Ottoman Empire via the Dagestan-Taman-Kaffa route. He participated in the Third Campaign of the Ottoman–Safavid War, and led an army of exiles and Turks to Shirvan in 1554. Despite a few victories, he lost the final battle and fled to Dagestan. His fate is unknown.

== Sources ==
- Floor, Willem M. (2008). Titles and Emoluments in Safavid Iran: A Third Manual of Safavid Administration, by Mirza Naqi Nasiri. Washington, DC: Mage Publishers. pp. 1–337. ISBN 978-1933823232.

Qasem Mirza House of Shirvanshah Born: ? Died: ?
Regnal titles
Preceded by Gurban Ali	Pretender to throne of Shirvanshahs; 1554	Succeeded by Kavus Mirza
