= Khalilullah I =

Khalilullah I خلیل الله یکم
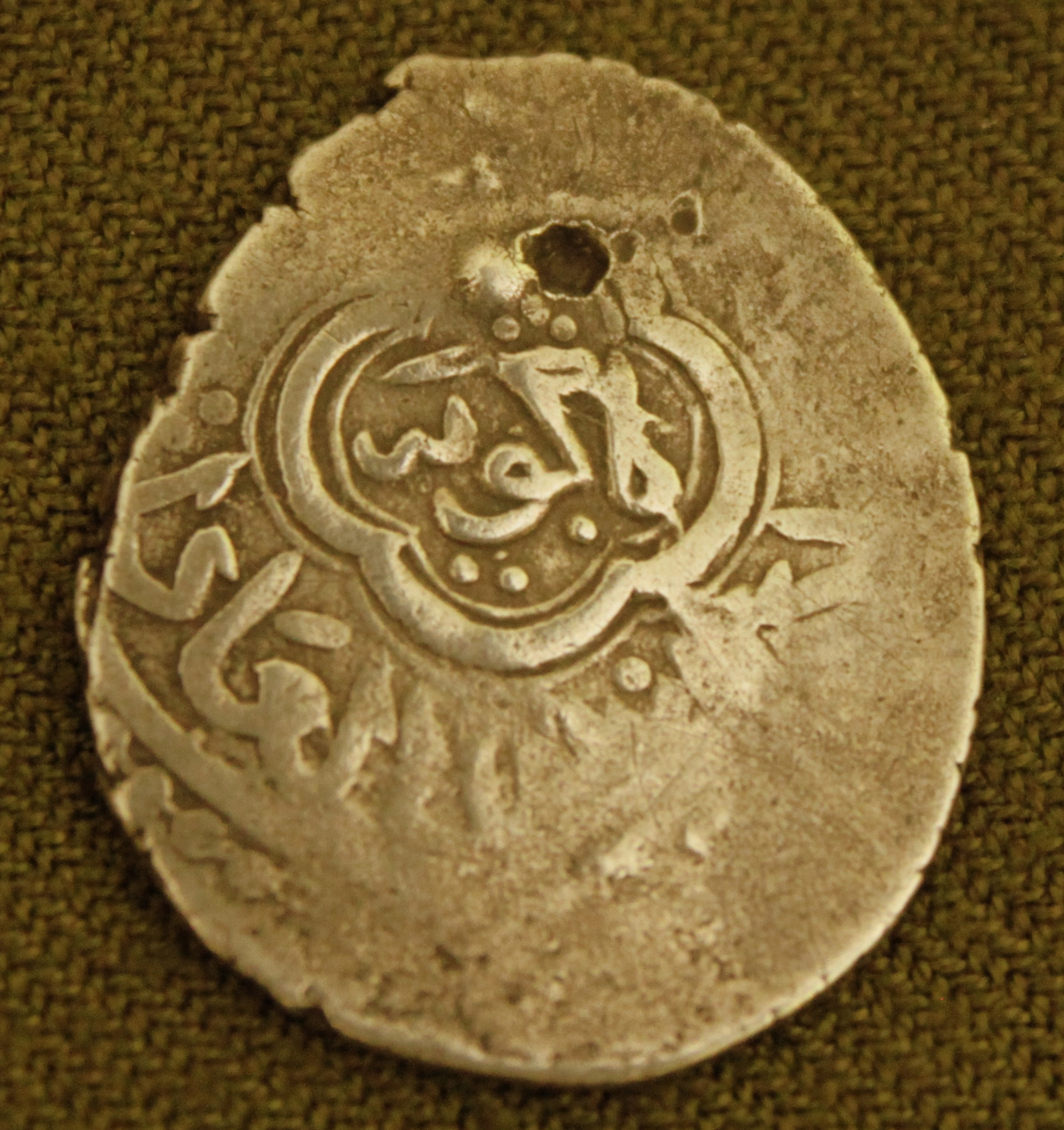
- Coin minted under Khalilullah I

Shirvanshah
- Reign: 1418–1465
- Predecessor: Ibrahim I
- Successor: Farrukh Yasar
- Died: 1465
- Burial: Shirvanshahs' Palace Mausoleum
- Spouse: Daughter of Abu Bakr ibn Miran Shah
- Issue: Farrukh Yamin; Farrukh Yasar; Shaykh Saleh; Amir Bahram; Muhammad Ibrahim
- House: Darbandids
- Father: Ibrahim I

Khalilullah I (Persian: خلیل الله یکم), also known as Sultan-Khalil (سلطان-خلیل), was the Shirvanshah (king of Shirvan) from 1418 to 1465. He was the son and successor of Ibrahim I (r. 1382–1418). He was succeeded by his son Farrukh Yasar.

== Reign ==
After the death of the Qara Qoyunlu ruler Qara Yusuf in 1420, many of his conquered subjects, who had formerly been vassals of the Timurid Empire, swore their fealty to Timur's son Shah Rukh (r. 1405–1447). This included Khalilullah, who also married a daughter (Qara Yusuf's widow) of the Timurid prince Abu Bakr ibn Miran Shah. In 1425, Sultan-Khalil faced a revolt led by his brothers Kay-Qubad, Ishaq and Hashim. With the help of Shah Rukh, however, he quelled the revolt. In 1432, Yar Ali, the son of the Qara Qoyunlu ruler Iskandar, fled to Shirvan, where he was given sanctuary by Khalilullah. This seemingly provoked the later Shirvan invasion of Iskandar in 1433/4, who reached as far as the city of Darband, later returning to Azerbaijan with loot and captives. Khalilullah appealed to the Aq Qoyunlu ruler Uthman Beg (r. 1378–1435), who in response invaded Qara Qoyunlu-ruled Armenia, capturing the city of Erzurum in the spring of 1434.

Between 1456 and 1459, the Safavid leader Shaykh Junayd made an alliance with the Aq Qoyunlu ruler Uzun Hasan (r. 1457–1478) by marrying his sister Khadija Begum. With the support of Uzun Hasan, Junayd made several incursions into northern Anatolia (Trebizond) and Circassia, but was killed in March 1460 by the forces of the Khalilullah during a battle near Tabarsaran. Khalilullah died in 1465, and was buried in the city of Baku. He was succeeded by his son Farrukh Yasar.

In 1500, following the Safavid conquest of Shirvan, the commander Khadem Beg Talish had the body of Khalilullah dug up, burned and publicly scattered.

== Sources ==
- Amanat, Abbas (2017). Iran: A Modern History. Yale University Press. pp. 1–992. ISBN 978-0300112542.
- Manz, Beatrice Forbes (2007). Power, Politics and Religion in Timurid Iran. Cambridge University Press. ISBN 978-1-139-46284-6.
- Minorsky, Vladimir (1958). A History of Sharvān and Darband in the 10th-11th Centuries. Cambridge: W. Heffer & Sons, Ltd.
- Mitchell, Colin P. (2009). The Practice of Politics in Safavid Iran: Power, Religion and Rhetoric. I.B.Tauris. pp. 1–304. ISBN 978-0857715883.
- Savory, Roger M.; Karamustafa, Ahmet T. (1998). "Esmāʿīl Ṣafawī". Encyclopædia Iranica, online edition, Vol. III, Fasc. 5. New York. pp. 514–522.
- Woods, John E. (1999). The Aqquyunlu: Clan, Confederation, Empire (Revised and Expanded ed.). University of Utah Press. ISBN 978-0874805659.

Khalilullah I Darbandids Died: 1465
Regnal titles
Preceded by Ibrahim I	Shirvanshah; 1418–1465	Succeeded by Farrukh Yasar
