= Farrukh Yasar =

Shah of Shirvan from 1465 to 1500

Farrukh Yasar I فرخ یسار
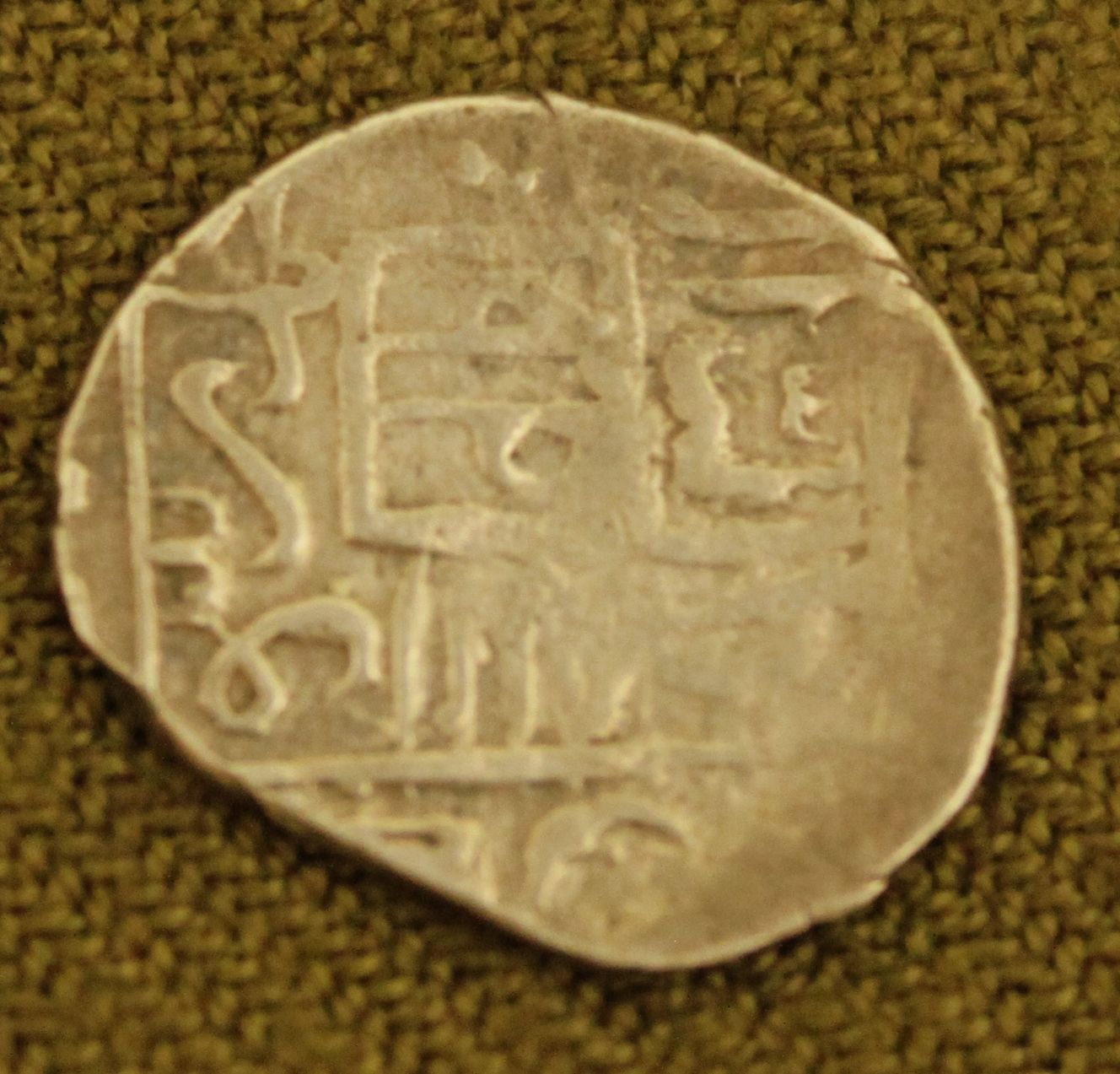
- Silver coin minted during reign of Farrukh Yasar

Shirvanshah
- Reign: 1465–1500
- Coronation: 1465
- Predecessor: Khalilullah I
- Successor: Bahram
- Born: 1441; Baku
- Died: 1500 (aged 58–59); Baku
- Spouse: Daughter of Usmi of Kaitag Adil Beg
- Issue: Gazi Beg; Shirvanshah Bahram Beg; Ibrahim II Sheykhshah; Gawhar-Sultan Khanum
Names
- Farrukh Yasar Darbandi
- House: House of Shirvanshah
- Father: Khalilullah I
- Religion: Islam

Farrukh Yasar (Persian: فرخ یسار) was the last independent ruler of Shirvan (1465–1500). In 1500, the first Safavid ruler, Ismail I, decisively defeated and killed Farrukh Yasar during his conquest of the area. Descendants of Farrukh Yasar continued to rule Shirvan under Safavid suzerainty, until 1538, when Ismail's son and successor Tahmasp I (r. 1524-1576) appointed its first Safavid governor, and made it a fully functioning Safavid province.

== Relations ==
=== Aq Qoyunlu ===
He averted strategy of his ancestor's - alliance with Timurids, instead he moved towards Uzun Hasan. He married his daughter to Uzun Hasan's son Yaqub. On 31 January 1468 the combined forces of Shirvanshahs and the Aq Qoyunlu defeated Timurid khan Abu Sa'id Mirza. Future sultans of the Aq Qoyunlu – Baysunghur and Murad – were his grandsons.

=== Ottomans ===
He sent his "Khalaf al-Umara and Akabir" (Deputy of emirs and nobles) Ziyaaddin Yusif and his personal merchant Khawja Yar Ahmad with 2 bullions of gold to Istanbul, in order to establish relations with Mehmed the Conqueror.

=== Russia ===
In 1465, Shirvanshah envoy Hasan Shirvani was sent to Moscow in order to establish diplomatic relations, in response Ivan III of Russia sent an embassy with leadership of Vasily Papin and a group of merchants (which also included Afanasy Nikitin) for trade and a pact against Golden Horde.

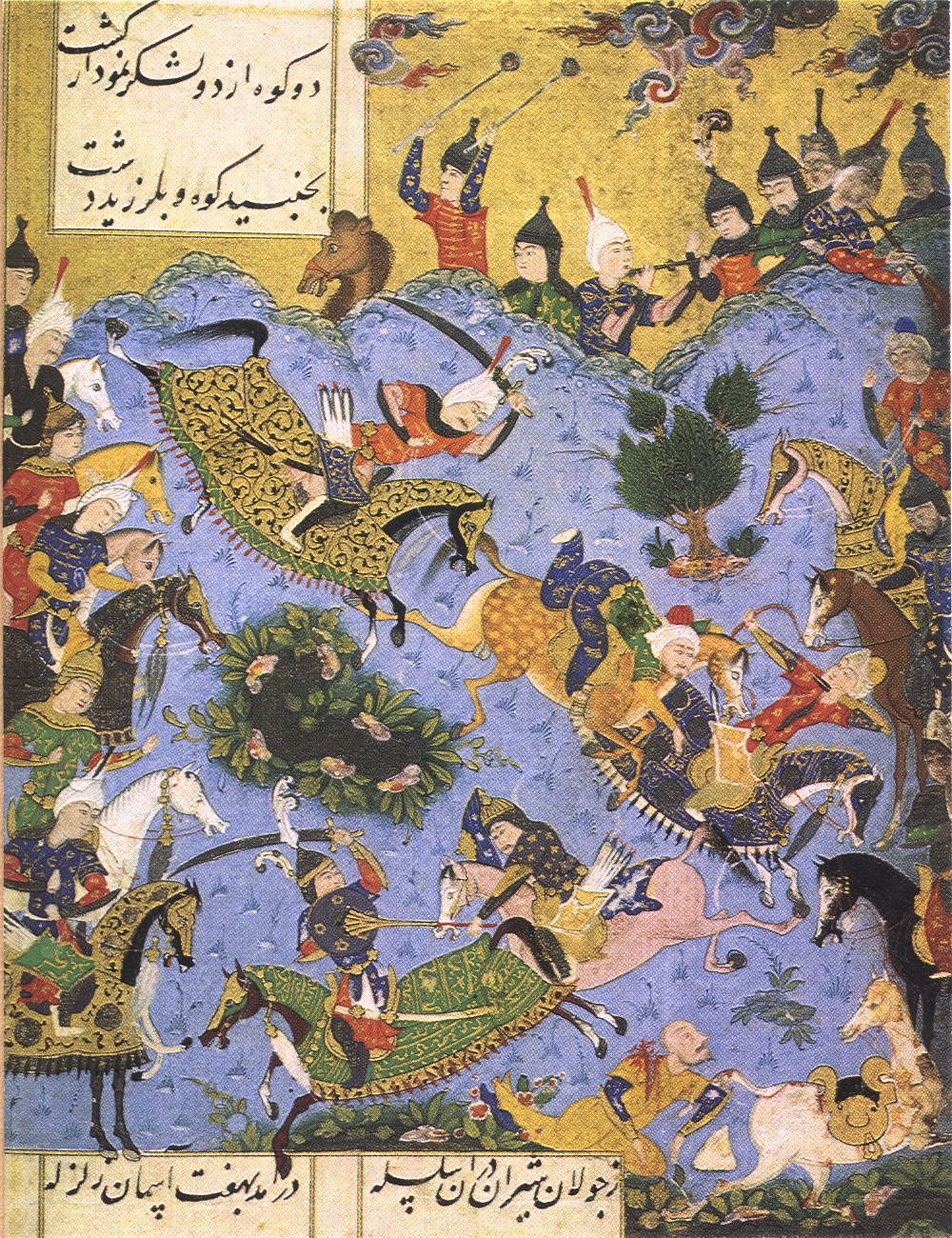
The battle between the young Ismail I and Shah Farrukh Yasar of Shirvan.

=== Safavids ===
During Uzun Hasan's reign, relations with Safavids were quite peaceful. But in 1488 Shaykh Haydar of the Safaviyya Shia sect moved through Shirvan towards Derbent, supposedly to wage jihad against the Circassians, but instead laid siege to Shamakhi. He captured the capital and burned it. Farrukh Yasar was not able to mount a defense and asked his son-in-law Sultan Yaqub of Ak Koyunlu to come to his rescue on 9 June 1488. Upon hearing his arrival, Sheikh retreated to Derbent. The combined forces of the Aq Qoyunlu under Suleiman Bey and the Shirvanshah forces which were led by shah himself, attacked to Qizilbash on 9 July 1488. Their combined forces were able to defeat the Safavid Qizilbash forces and Shaykh Haydar was wounded by an arrow. He was captured by gatekeeper Ali aga who severed his head and sent to Sultan Yaqub.

== Aq Qoyunlu civil war ==
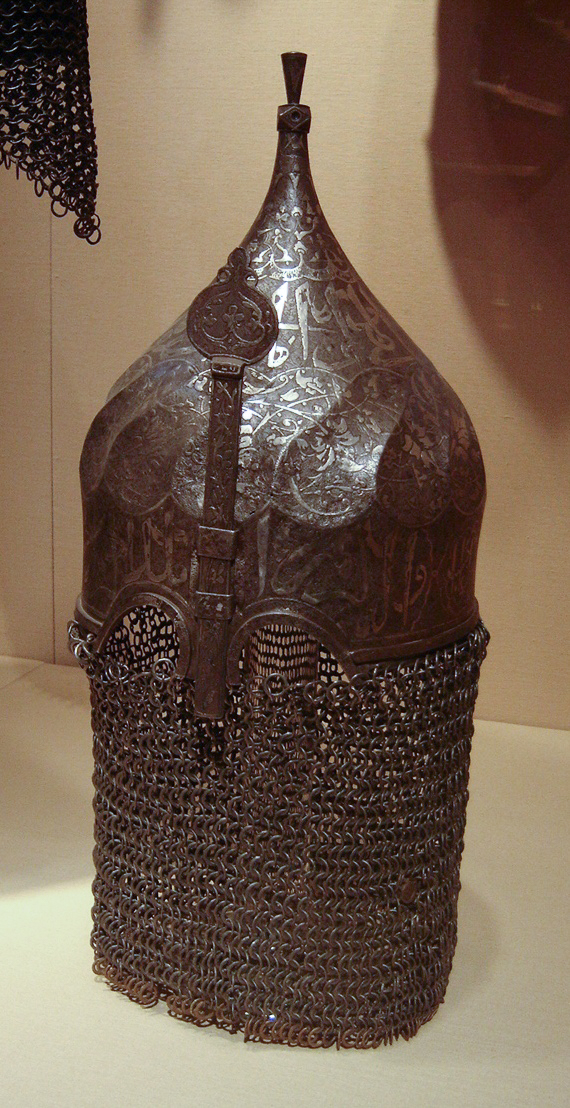
Another helmet that bears name of Farrukh Yasar. ("New York Metropolitan Museum")

Upon death of his son-in-law in 1490, he supported his grandson Baysunghur for keeping the throne. In 1492, he fled to Shirvan upon dethronement. However he was killed in a battle between Barda and Ganja. The brother of Baysunghur, Murad also fled to Shirvan sometime later and stayed there until 1497.

== Sheikhshah ==
In 1497 Shaki ruler Shah Husain rebelled with Shah's youngest son future king Ibrahim II Shaykhshah and raided Gabala for 8 days. Shah crushed them with his other sons and Abulfath beg - the Vali of Gabala. However, they were pardoned.

== Later reign and death ==
Young Ismail was freed by his cousin, the new Aq Qoyunlu sultan Rustam in 1492. He decided to take revenge of his father, but rulers of Ardabil, Ali beg Jayirli and Talysh ruler Muhammad, who were vassals of the Shirvanshahs, did not give any help when demanded. Ismail then moved on to Qarabagh and then to Erzincan. In 1499, he began to march on Shirvan. Two forces met on Battle of Jabani, near Shamakhi. Shirvan's forces were devastated and shah were captured and beheaded. Ismail captured Shamakhi, and moved on to Baku.

== Legacy ==
He was remembered as merciful and glorious ruler by many sources. Construction of Tuba Shahi Mosque and Juma Mosque in Derbent were patronized by himself.

== Family ==
Farrukh Yasar was married to daughter of Usmi of Kaitag Adil bey

- Gazi Beg - Shirvanshah in 1501.
- Shirvanshah Bahram Beg - Shirvanshah in 1502.
- Ibrahim II Sheykhshah - Shirvanshah after his brothers.
- Gawhar-Sultan Khanum – Married to Uzun Hasan son Yaqub.

== Sources ==
- Fisher, William Bayne; Avery, P.; Hambly, G. R. G; Melville, C. (1986). The Cambridge History of Iran. Vol. 6. Cambridge: Cambridge University Press. ISBN 978-0521200943.
- Minorsky, Vladimir (1958). A History of Sharvān and Darband in the 10th-11th Centuries. Cambridge: W. Heffer & Sons, Ltd.

Farrukh Yasar House of Shirvanshah Born: 1441 Died: 1500
Regnal titles
| Preceded by Khalilullah I | Shirvanshah; 1465–1500 | Succeeded by Shirvanshah Bahram Beg |
