= Badr Khan Ustajlu =

Badr Khan Ustajlu (Persian: بدر خان استاجلو) was a Turkoman military officer from the Ustajlu tribe, who served as the tutor (lala) of the Safavid prince Alqas Mirza and as the governor (beglarbeg) of Shirvan from 1538 to 1541 and later from 1543 to 1547 after a second reappointment to the post.

== Sources ==
- Floor, Willem M. (2008). Titles and Emoluments in Safavid Iran: A Third Manual of Safavid Administration, by Mirza Naqi Nasiri. Washington, DC: Mage Publishers. pp. 1–337. ISBN 978-1933823232.
- Fleischer, C. (1989). "ALQĀS MĪRZA". Encyclopedia Iranica.
