= Qorban Ali Mirza =

Gurban Ali
- Self-declared Shah of Shirvan
- Reign: 1550
- Coronation: 1550
- Predecessor: Mehrab of Shirvan
- Born: ? ?
- Died: 1550; Boyuk Zira
Names
- Gurban Ali
- House: House of Shirvanshah
- Father: unknown
- Religion: Sunni

Gurban was the self-declared Shah of Shirvan after the downfall of Mehrab of Shirvan.

== Life ==
He was chosen by rebel leaders as the next pretender. His exact relationship to the former shahs is unknown, but he is believed to be member of dynasty of Shirvanshahs. He rebelled in Boyuk Zira but was killed by Abdulla Khan Ustajlu.

== Sources ==
- Floor, Willem (2008). Titles and Emoluments in Safavid Iran: A Third Manual of Safavid Administration, by Mirza Naqi Nasiri. Washington, D.C.: Mage Publishers. ISBN 978-1933823232.

Qorban Ali Mirza House of Shirvanshah Born: ? Died: 1550
Regnal titles
Preceded by Burhan Ali	Pretender to throne of Shirvanshahs; 1550	Succeeded by Gasim Mirza
