= Kavus Mirza =

- Self-declared Shah of Shirvan
- Reign: 1577
- Coronation: 1577
- Predecessor: Gasim Mirza
- Successor: Abu Bakr Mirza
- Born: ? ?
- Died: ? ?
Names
- Shah Kavus Mirza
- House: House of Shirvanshah
- Father: unknown
- Mother: sister of Burhan Ali
- Religion: Sunni Islam

Kavus Mirza was the self-declared Shah of Shirvan in exile after the downfall of Qasem Mirza.

== Life ==
He was member of the Shirvanshahs and was the nephew of Burhan Ali. He invaded Shirvan from Dagestan in 1577/8, but was defeated near Shabran. His fate is unknown.

Kavus Mirza House of Shirvanshah Born: ? Died: ?
Regnal titles
Preceded by Gasim Mirza	Pretender to throne of Shirvanshahs; 1577	Succeeded by Abu Bakr Mirza
