= Sultan Mahmud (Shirvanshah) =

- Shah of Shirvan
- Reign: 1501–1502
- Coronation: 1501
- Predecessor: Gazi Beg
- Successor: Ibrahim II Sheykhshah
- Born: ? Baku
- Died: 1505; Gulustan castle
Names
- Shamkhal Sultan Mahmud Gazi Beg
- House: House of Shirvanshah
- Father: Gazi Beg

Sultan Mahmud was the 39th shah of Shirvan.

== Career under Farrukh Yassar ==
He was appointed as wali of Mahmudabad and Salyan by his grandfather Farrukh Yassar.

== Reign and exile ==
He rebelled and killed his father Gazi Beg and declared himself shah. He met resistance from local Shirvan people who rebelled against him in turn, and sent him into exile. Mahmud lived in the court of Ismail I in later years.

Sultan Mahmud (Shirvanshah) House of Shirvanshah Born: ? Died: ?
Regnal titles
Preceded by Gazi Beg	Shirvanshah; 1501–1502	Succeeded by Ibrahim II Sheykhshah
