= Burhan Ali =

- Self-declared Shah of Shirvan
- Reign: 1548-1550
- Coronation: July 1548
- Predecessor: Shahrukh of Shirvan
- Successor: Mehrab of Shirvan
- Born: c. 1519
- Died: 1549 (aged 29–30); Galeyi Beygurt
- Issue: Khalaf Mirza; Abu Bakr Mirza
- House: House of Derbent
- Father: Khalilullah II
- Mother: Parikhan Khanum
- Religion: Sunni

Burhan Ali (Persian: برهان علی) or Sultan Burhaneddin (in Ottoman sources) was a self-declared Shah of Shirvan.

== Life ==
He was probably born in c. 1519 to Khalilullah II and Parikhan Khanum but was bypassed during succession in favor of Shahrukh. A year later of this succession, his mother was married to Darvish Mohammad Khan. However Abbasgulu Bakikhanov suggested his full name as "Burhan Ali bin Keyqobad bin Abu Bakr bin Amir Ishaq bin Ibrahim I of Shirvan". He probably had another brother called Maqsud Ali.

His steward appeared at the court of Suleyman the Magnificent on 6 November 1542. According to Walter Posch, that his father's cousin, Mirza Muhammad Shirvani, son of Ghazi Beg who was governor of Trabzon at the time, might have intermediated the visit. Soon, Burhan Ali himself appeared at the Porte and was given an honorary robe on 15 December 1543. He was given another honorary robe on 26 January 1544 and soon was sent to Shirvan.

Same year he invaded Shirvan with aid from Kaitag and was defeated by his uncle Alqas Mirza. He travelled to Istanbul after defeat and was aided by Suleyman the Magnificent. He invaded Shirvan again in Autumn 1547 but was defeated by the governor of Shirvan, future shah Ismail II. Taking advantage of the Ottoman–Safavid War, he easily invaded Shirvan a final time, set out from Sivas in May 1548. He lost a battle with Gokche sultan Qajar, lala of Ismail Mirza, near Kolhan forest. However, as soon as Ottoman army arrived and forced Ismail to join his father's forces, Burhan Ali captured Shamakhy, and declared himself Shirvanshah in July 1548. News of conquest reached to Ottoman court on 18 July.

According to Walter Posch, Safavid chroniclers tended to downplay significance of Burhan Ali, seeing him merely a local rebel in contrast to more dangerous Alqas Mirza.

=== Death ===
In Autumn of 1549, the Safavid army under Abdulla khan Ustajli was sent to Shirvan to end the rebellion. Abdullah crossed Kura river from Cavad, while Burhan Ali stationed himself in Buğurd valley, however he died possibly of illness suddenly. His followers appointed Mehrab of Shirvan as their leader and continued resistance. Abdullah khan found his resting place, had his body exhumed and decapitated. He was later granted the hand of Parikhan Khanum, Burhan Ali's mother. Ottoman registers noted his death in their annal by 15 July 1550.

=== Family ===
Although it isn't known to whom he was married, Ottoman sources contain several records of his children who settled in Bursa:

- Sheikh Ibrahim
- Gawhar
- Abu Bakr Mirza
- Khalaf Mirza

Burhan Ali House of Shirvanshah Born: ? Died: 1550
Regnal titles
Preceded by Shahrukh of Shirvan	Pretender to throne of Shirvanshahs; 1544-1550	Succeeded by Mehrab of Shirvan
