= Shirvanshahs' bath houses =

Shirvanshahs’ bath houses
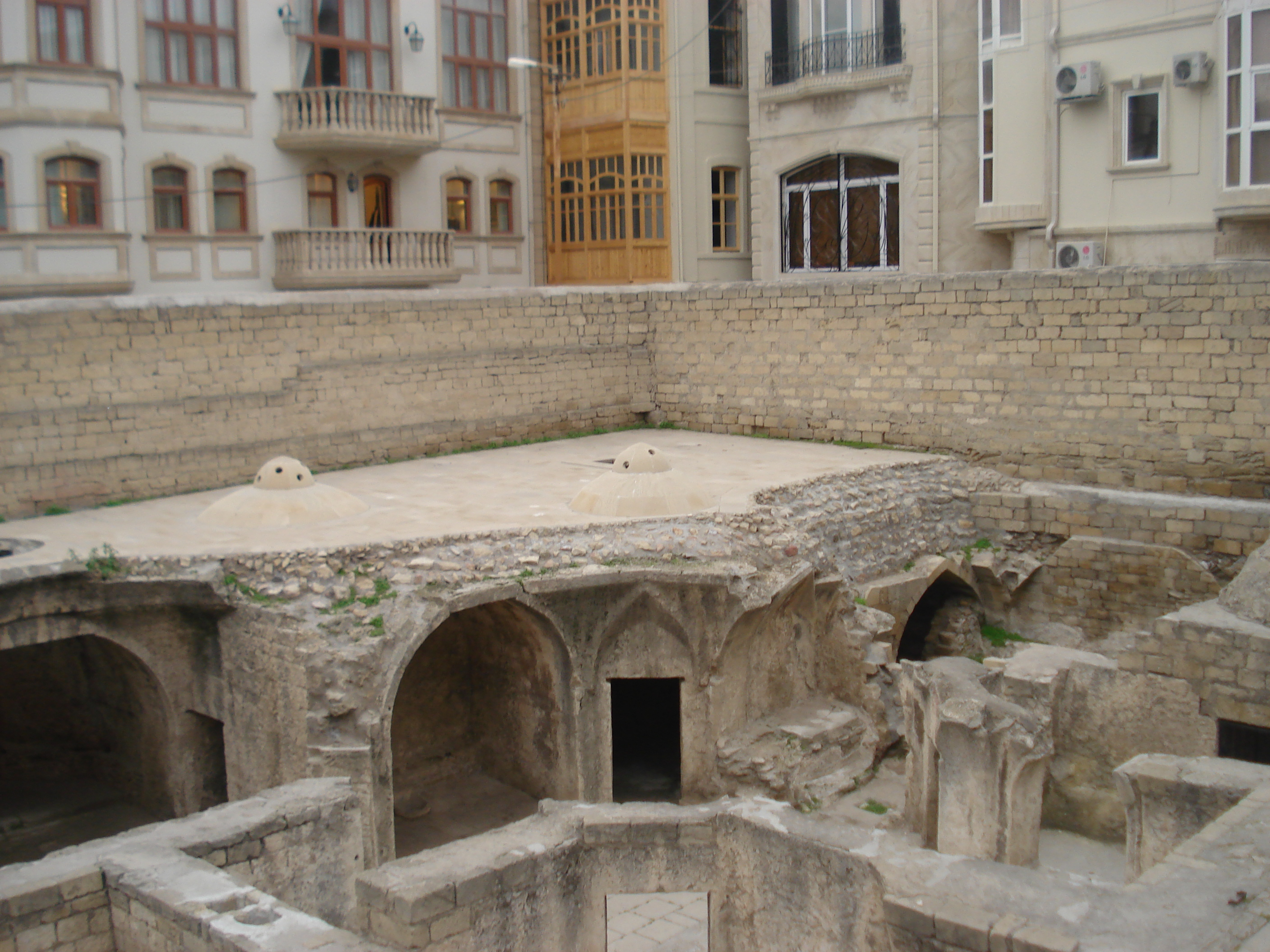
- Interactive map of Shirvanshahs’ bath houses
- Location: Old City, Baku, Azerbaijan
- Coordinates: 40°21′58″N 49°50′00″E
- Type: Bath house
- Beginning date: 15th century

The palatial bath houses of the Shirvanshahs (Azerbaijani: Şirvanşahlar hamamı, Persian: حمام‌های شیروان‌شاهان) are dated back to the 15th century and are a part of the Shirvanshahs’ Palace Complex. It was built by the Iranian Shirvanshahs and is situated in the eastern part of a lower yard.

== Architecture ==
The bath house is deep, which is typical of bath-houses of whole the Absheron peninsula. Only cupolas were above the ground. The most biggest premises were covered with cupolas. Necessary temperatures of various premises had been tried to keep by an internal planning depending on their assignment.

Remains of cupolas and arched coverings are evidence of the highest standards of architecture. Reasoning of organization of the internal space and properly found correlation of dimensions of the premises should be especially mentioned.
