= Kələxana =

Kələxana Քալախան • Kalakhan
- Municipality
- Location within Azerbaijan
- Coordinates: 40°35′35″N 48°36′41″E
- Country: Azerbaijan
- District: Shamakhi
- Time zone: UTC+4 (AZT)

Kələxana (Armenian: Քալախան, romanized: Kalakhan, also Kelakhan, Kelakhana, and Kelakhany) was a village and municipality in the Shamakhi District of Azerbaijan. The village had an Armenian population before the exodus of Armenians from Azerbaijan after the outbreak of the Nagorno-Karabakh conflict. In 1999, the village was administratively merged with a neighbourhood from the city of Shamakhi to create the Şəhriyar village.
