= Khurshah ibn Qubad =

Indian diplomat (died 1565)

- Died: July 1565 Golconda, Qutb Shahi dynasty
- Occupation: Diplomat, historian
- Notable works: Tarikh-e Ilchi
- Relatives: Shah Tahir (?)

Khurshah ibn Qubad (Persian: خورشاه بن قباد, romanized: Ḵoršāh ebn Qobād; died July 1565) was a Hyderabad-based diplomat and historian of Iranian ancestry. He is principally known for his Persian-language universal history, the Tarikh-e Ilchi, dedicated to his suzerain, the Qutb Shahi ruler Ibrahim Quli Qutb Shah Wali (r. 1550–1580).

== Biography ==
Not much is known about Khurshah's life and career. Contemporary records written around his time indicates that he was a kinsman of Shah Tahir, an Isma'ili scholar, poet and administrator. This may simply suggest that like Shah Tahir, Khurshah was also from an Isma'ili background. From the same evidence, it can also be deduced that Shah Taher was from Khand (also spelled Khvand or Khond), a rural district situated between Qazvin and Soltaniyeh, an area where the Mohammad-shahi branch of the Isma'ili da'wa (missionary activity) had established a propaganda network. Some of the distinguished Isma'ili figures of Khand had reportedly established themselves in Soltaniyeh during the end of the 15th-century, which suggests that Khurshah may have lived there during the start of the 16th-century.

Shah Tahir was originally part of the court of the Safavid shah (king) Ismail I (r. 1501–1524), but was eventually forced to abandon his position due to the bad reputation he had received due to anti-Isma'ili schemes by his rivals. In early May 1520, Shah Tahir and his close family members (probably either including Khurshah or his parents) fled to the port city of Jerun (Bandar Abbas). From there they sailed to Goa, and then proceeded to Bijapur, and then eventually Ahmadnagar. There Shah Tahir entered under the service of its ruler, Burhan Nizam Shah I (r. 1509–1552), under whom he led an illustrious administrative career.

The later successful administrative career that Khurshah led was most likely aided by Shah Tahir's political prestige. Khurshah died in July 1565 in Golconda.

== Sources ==
- Ghereghlou, Kioumars (2013). "Ḵoršāh b. Qobād Ḥoseyni, Neẓām-al-din". Encyclopaedia Iranica.
- Peacock, A.C.S (2020). "Remembering Turkish Origins in the Sixteenth- and Seventeenth Century Deccan: The Qaraqoyunlu Past in the Persian Chronicles of the Qutbshahi Dynasty". In Peacock, A.C.S.; McClary, Richard Piran (eds.). Turkish History and Culture in India: Identity, Art and Transregional Connections. Brill's Indological Library. Vol. 53. Brill. pp. 152–203. doi:10.1163/9789004437364_008. ISBN 978-90-04-43736-4.
