= Shahrukh of Shirvan =

Shahrukh

Shirvanshah
- Reign: 1535–1538
- Predecessor: Khalilullah II
- Successor: Shirvanshah rule ended
- Dynasty: Darbandis
- Father: Farrukh Yassar II
- Religion: Sunni Islam

Shahrukh (Persian: شاهرخ) was the last Shirvanshah, governing Shirvan under Safavid suzerainty from 1535 to 1538. After persistent disloyalty, the Safavid shah (king) Tahmasp I (r. 1524–1576) expelled him, and made Shirvan a full administrative subunit of Safavid Iran. Subsequently, he appointed his brother Alqas Mirza as its governor.

A reconquest of Shirvan was attempted multiple times by members of the Shirvanshah family, including Burhan Ali and his son Abu Bakr Mirza, who enlisted the help of the Ottoman Empire. However, none of these attempts had long-term success; the Ottomans managed to briefly occupy Shirvan between 1578–1607, until it was retaken by the Safavids.

== Sources ==
- Barthold, W. & Bosworth, C.E. (1997). "S̲h̲īrwān S̲h̲āh". In Bosworth, C. E.; van Donzel, E.; Heinrichs, W. P. & Lecomte, G. (eds.). The Encyclopaedia of Islam, Second Edition. Volume IX: San–Sze. Leiden: E. J. Brill. pp. 488–489. ISBN 978-90-04-10422-8.
- Floor, Willem M. (2008). Titles and Emoluments in Safavid Iran: A Third Manual of Safavid Administration, by Mirza Naqi Nasiri. Washington, DC: Mage Publishers. ISBN 978-1933823232.

Shahrukh of Shirvan House of Shirvanshah
Regnal titles
Preceded by Khalilullah II	Shirvanshah; 1538	Succeeded by Safavid Iran
Preceded by Khalilullah II	Pretender to throne of Shirvanshahs; 1539	Succeeded by Burhan Ali
