= Şəhriyar, Shamakhi =

Şəhriyar
- Municipality
- Location within Azerbaijan
- Coordinates: 40°35′35″N 48°36′41″E
- Country: Azerbaijan
- Rayon: Shamakhi

Population
  - Total: 248
- Time zone: UTC+4 (AZT)
  - Summer (DST): UTC+5 (AZT)

Şəhriyar is a village and municipality in the Shamakhi Rayon of Azerbaijan. It has a population of 2,033.

It was formed in 1999 through detaching a neighbourhood from the city of Shamakhi and merging it with the nearby village of Kələxana.
