= Mehrab of Shirvan =

Mehrab Mirza
- Self-declared Shah of Shirvan
- Reign: 1550
- Coronation: 1550
- Predecessor: Burhan Ali
- Born: ? ?
- Died: ? ?
Names
- Mehrab
- House: House of Shirvanshah
- Father: unknown
- Religion: Sunni

Mehrab Mirza was the self-declared Shah of Shirvan after the death of Burhan Ali.

== Life ==
He was chosen by rebel leaders as the next pretender after the sudden death of Burhan Ali. His exact relationship to the former shahs is unknown but he is believed to be member of the dynasty of Shirvanshahs. He advanced with his army as far as Sığnax, but was defeated and fled Shirvan.

Mehrab of Shirvan House of Shirvanshah Born: ? Died: 1550
Regnal titles
Preceded by Burhan Ali	Pretender to throne of Shirvanshahs; 1550	Succeeded by Gurban Ali
