= Qaleybuğurd =

- Municipality
- Location within Azerbaijan
- Coordinates: 40°45′24″N 48°34′07″E
- Country: Azerbaijan
- Rayon: Shamakhi

Population
  - Total: 807
- Time zone: UTC+4 (AZT)
  - Summer (DST): UTC+5 (AZT)

Qaleybuğurd (also, Qalaybuğurt, Kalaybugurt, Kaleybugurt, and Keleybugurt) is a village and municipality in the Shamakhi Rayon of Azerbaijan. It has a population of 807.
