= Bahram Beg (Shirvanshah) =

- Shah of Shirvan
- Reign: 1500–1501
- Coronation: 1500
- Predecessor: Farrukh Yassar
- Successor: Shirvanshah Gazi Beg
- Born: ? Baku
- Died: 1501; Baku
- House: House of Shirvanshah
- Father: Farrukh Yassar

Bahram Beg (Persian: بهرام بیگ) was the 37th Shirvanshah, and ruled over Shirvan under Safavid suzerainty. Despite the enmity that existed between the Shirvanshahs and the ruling Safavid dynasty, Safavid king Ismail I (r. 1501–1524) allowed, after his conquest and defeat of Bahram's father Farrukh Yassar, the latter to rule as a Safavid subject.

== Death of Bahram Beg by Gazi Beg ==
During his reign, Bahram Beg appointed his brother Ghazi Beg as the commander of the Shirvan Shahan Corps, and Ghazi Beg formed an army called the Golden Corps of the Caucasus. When Bahram Beg saw that his brother had formed this corps, he thought that he had an instalment to seize the throne, so he dismissed his brother and ordered his assassination. Upon learning of this, Ghazi Beg killed his brother in the evening and seized the throne.

Bahram Beg (Shirvanshah) House of Shirvanshah Born: ? Died: 1501
Regnal titles
Preceded by Farrukh Yassar	Shirvanshah; 1500–1501	Succeeded by Shirvanshah Gazi Beg
