= Abu Bakr Mirza =

- Self-declared Shah of Shirvan
- Reign: 1578-1602?
- Coronation: 1578
- Predecessor: Kavus Mirza
- Died: 1602
- Spouse: daughter of Devlet I Giray
- Issue: Burhan Ali Mirza
Names
- Abu Bakr Mirza
- House: House of Shirvanshah
- Father: Burhan Ali
- Religion: Sunni Islam

Abu Bakr Mirza was the final self-declared Shah of Shirvan after the downfall of Kavus Mirza.

== Early life ==
He was member of the Shirvanshahs, and was son of Burhan Ali. In 1550 he was taken to Dagestan by loyal noblemen. He lived in Dagestan for 20 years, then passed to the Crimean khanate in 1570, where he was married to the daughter of Devlet I Giray. He invaded Shirvan with the aid of the Ottoman Empire in 1578, and ruled Shirvan as vassal of Murad III until his death in 1602, according to Sara Ashurbeyli. However, Abbasgulu Bakikhanov states that he wished to rule Shirvan as a vassal of Safavids, so he sent his son Burhan Ali Mirza to court of shah, who failed to gain recognition. His whereabouts are not known. After him, no pretenders claimed the throne of the Shirvanshahs.

Abu Bakr Mirza House of Shirvanshah Born: ? Died: 1602
Regnal titles
Preceded by Kavus Mirza	Pretender to throne of Shirvanshahs; 1578-1602?	Extinct
