= Ibrahim II Shaykhshah =

Sheykh Ibrahim II
- Shah of Shirvan
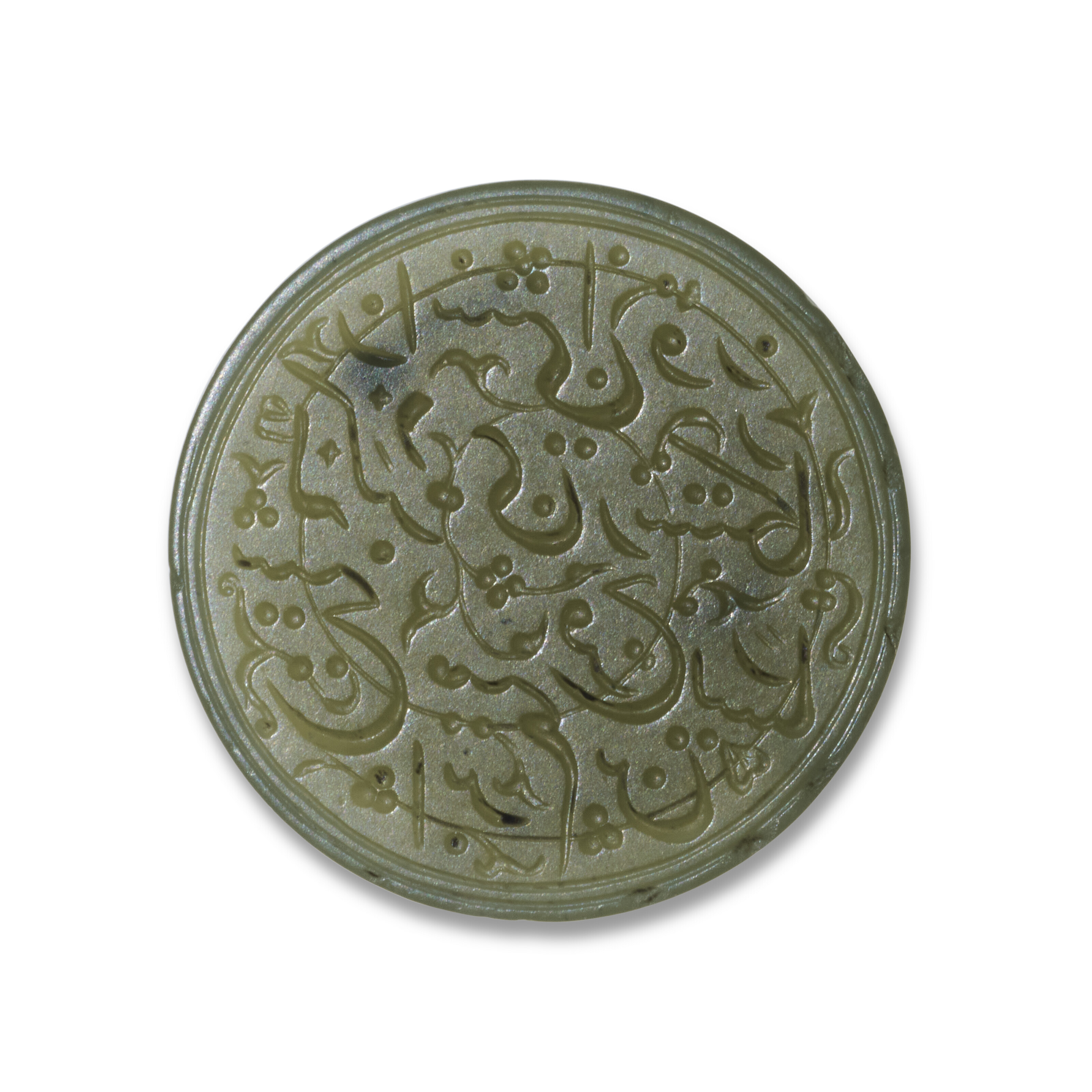
- A royal jade seal in the name of Shaykh Ibrahim II, east Caucasus or Iran, first quarter 16th century. Inscribed with nastaliq against a swirling vine
- Reign: 1502 - 1524
- Coronation: 1502
- Predecessor: Mahmud
- Successor: Khalilullah II
- Born: ? Baku
- Died: 1524; Baku
Names
- Ibrahim Sheykhshah
- House: House of Shirvanshah
- Father: Farrukh Yassar
- Religion: Shia Islam

Sheykh Ibrahim II was the 40th shah of Shirvan.

== Coming to power ==
Not much is known about his childhood. He fled to Nowshahr after his brother Gazi Beg's disastrous defeat. Having heard news that the Safavid ruler Ismail I was coming after him, he fled to Gilan, where he hid for two years. In 1502, a rebellion erupted in Shirvan and his nephew Sultan Mahmud was deposed. Local people invited Ibrahim to the throne of Shirvan same year.

== Reign ==
In his 3rd year of rule, Shah Ismail I besieged Gulustan castle in order to restore Mahmud who fled to his court after deposition. After three months of siege, unexpectedly, a slave of Mahmud beheaded him at night and sent his head to Ibrahim. Sheykhshah, excited by the news, suddenly made a raid on besieging Safavid forces and forced them to flee. Despite victory, he accepted to be vassal of Ismail.

== Relations with Safavids ==
In 1507, Sheykhshah rebelled against the Safavids but was forced to make peace again in 1509. He visited Tabriz in 1518 as a guest of Ismail I. In response to his loyalty, Ismail offered an engagement of between his daughter and Prince Khalil. In 1523, Ismail married a daughter of Sheykhshah.

== Family ==
Sheykshah fathered seven sons, only 4 of them is known:

- Prince Khalil
- Prince Muhammad - d. 1528 in a battle with Uzbeks in army of Tahmasp I.
- Prince Muzaffar - fled to the Gazikumukh Shamkhalate.
- Prince Farrukh Yassar - fled to the Gazikumukh Shamkhalate.

Ibrahim II Shaykhshah House of Shirvanshah Born: ? Died: 1524
Regnal titles
| Preceded by Mahmud | Shirvanshah; 1502–1524 | Succeeded by Khalilullah II |
