= Khalilullah II =

- Shah of Shirvan

Shirvanshah
- Reign: 1524-1535
- Coronation: 1524
- Predecessor: Ibrahim II Sheykhshah
- Successor: Farrukh Yassar II; Shahrukh of Shirvan
- Died: 1535; Baku
- Spouse: Parikhan Khanum
- Issue: Burhan Ali
- House: House of Shirvanshah
- Father: Ibrahim II Sheykhshah
- Religion: Sunni

Khalilullah II (Persian: خلیل الله دوم) was the 41st Shirvanshah, governing Shirvan under Safavid suzerainty between 1524—1535.

== Reign ==
Born as Khalil, after the death of his father, he assumed the regnal name of Khalilullah II in 1524. He was married to Ismail I's daughter, and Tahmasp I's sister Parikhan Khanum (not to be mistaken for Tahmasp's daughter Pari Khan Khanum) on 4 October 1521.

== Relations with Safavids ==
After death of Ismail I, the new shah Tahmasp I was suspicious towards the new shirvanshah. This suspicion had grown when the latter gave asylum to a traitor to the Safavids - Gilan ruler Sultan Muzaffar. However, before demanding a pardon, Khalilullah died unexpectedly without issue, and was succeeded by Farrukh Yassar II.

Khalilullah II House of Shirvanshah Born: ? Died: 1535
Regnal titles
Preceded by Ibrahim II Sheykhshah	Shirvanshah; 1524–1535	Succeeded by Shahrukh of Shirvan
