= Ghazi Beg =

Gazi Beg
- Shah of Shirvan
- Reign: 1501
- Coronation: 1501
- Predecessor: Bahram Beg
- Successor: Sultan Mahmud
- Born: ? Baku
- Died: 1501; Baku
- Issue: Sultan Mahmud
Names
- Sultan Muhammad Ghazi Beg
- House: House of Shirvanshah
- Father: Farrukh Yassar

Ghazi Beg, 38th Shirvanshah, succeeded his brother in 1501. His entire reign was during a 6-month siege of Baku by the Safavid Shah Ismail I. He was a weak ruler, who ruled briefly only Baku, Salyan and Mahmudabad. Although he resisted the Safavid siege for 6 months, he executed envoys of Ismail and a dargha who advised to him to make peace. He was forced to give up city after the Storming of Baku by the Safavid army. He was killed by his son, Sultan Mahmud, in the same year.

== Sources ==
- Floor, Willem (2008). Titles and Emoluments in Safavid Iran: A Third Manual of Safavid Administration, by Mirza Naqi Nasiri. Washington, D.C.: Mage Publishers. ISBN 978-1933823232.

Ghazi Beg House of Shirvanshah Born: ? Died: 1501
Regnal titles
Preceded by Bahram Beg	Shirvanshah; 1501–1501	Succeeded by Sultan Mahmud
