= Index of sociology of food articles =

The sociology of food is the study of food as it relates to the history, progression, and future development of society. This includes production, distribution, conflict, medical application, ritual, spiritual, and cultural applications, environmental and labor issues.

== Alphabetically ==
=== 0-A ===
- 5 A Day
- Acceptable daily intake
- Aggregate nutrient density index
- Ageusia
- Animal source foods
- Additives
- Aeroponics
- Agriculture
- Alcohol
- Alcoholic beverage control state
- Algaculture
- Androphagi
- Antibiotic
- Antioxidant
- Appellation
- Appellation d'origine contrôlée
- Apiculture
- Aphagia
- Appetite
- Aquaculture
- Asado

=== B ===
- Baker's dozen
- Baking
- Banchan
- Barbecue
- Barbecue in the United States
- Beer
- Beer style
- Benzopyrene
- Berenklauw
- Beverage-can stove
- Biodiversity
- Blind-baking
- Birthday cake
- Bottom trawling
- Bottled water
- Braai
- Breadbox
- Broasting
- Broiling
- Bulgogi
- Bread
- Bushfood
- Bushmeat
- Bycatch

=== C ===
- Canning
- Cannibalism
- Carbohydrate
- Carry over cooking
- Cart noodle
- Catch and release
- Casu marzu
- Cereal
- Cha chaan teng
- Charbroil
- Churchkhela
- Comfort food
- Common Agricultural Policy
- Common Fisheries Policy
- Control of fire by early humans
- Conveyor belt sushi
- Convenience food
- Cooking
- Cookware and bakeware
- Cretan diet
- Curing
- Culinary
- Curry
- Catering

=== D ===
- Dai pai dong
- Deep frying
- Denominazione di origine controllata
- Diabetes
- Diet
- Dietary fiber
- Dietary supplement
- Dieting
- Digestion
- Dim sum
- Distilled beverage
- Drying
- Dysgeusia

=== E ===
- Eating
- Eating disorders
- Enzyme
- Entomophagy
- Environmental vegetarianism
- Essential nutrient
- Ethics
- Exercise

=== F ===
- Factory ship
- Famine
- FARMA
- Farmers' market
- Fast food
- Fasting
- Fat
- Fat acceptance movement
- Finger bowl
- Fishing
- Food allergy
- Food bank
- Food chain
- Food consumption by class
- Food contaminants
- Food delivery
- Food energy
- Food for Peace
- Food fortification
- Food guide pyramid
- Food irradiation
- Food labeling regulations (U.K., E.U.)
- Food loss and waste
- Food microbiology
- Food policy
- Food politics
- Food porn
- Food price crisis
- Food processing
- Food safety
- Food security
- Foodservice
- Food sovereignty
- Food technology
- Food vs fuel
- Foodways
- Foraging
- FreeRice
- Free The Hops
- Fresherized
- Fruitarianism
- Functional food

=== G ===
- Galbi
- Game
- Game & Wildlife Conservation Trust
- Gas Mark
- Gastronationalism
- Gastronomy
- Geographical indication
- Geographical indications and traditional specialities (EU)
- Geoponic
- Glycemic index
- Gourmet Museum and Library
- Green Revolution
- Grilling
- Grocery store

=== H ===
- Healthy eating pyramid
- Health claims on food labels
- Hechsher
- Hechsher Tzedek
- High altitude cooking
- High-Level Conference on World Food Security
- Home canning
- Hot salt frying
- Hot sand frying
- Hunger
- Hunter-gatherer
- Hunting
- Hydroponics

=== I ===
- Ikizukuri
- Inedia
- Indigenous Australian food groups
- International English food terms

=== J ===
- Jamaican jerk spice

=== K ===
- Kansas City-style barbecue
- Kashrut
- Ketogenic diet
- Kitchen stove
- Korean barbecue

=== L ===
- Leftovers
- Liqueur
- Local food
- Lou mei

=== M ===
- Main course
- Mariculture
- Marination
- Marine Protected Area
- Mastication
- Maximum sustainable yield
- Meal
- Meat analogue
- (metabolic foods)
- Mushroom hunting
- Mineral
- MyPyramid

=== N ===
- Nasi liwet
- Nutraceutical
- Nutrition
- Nyotaimori

=== O ===
- Obesity
- Odori ebi
- Oenology
- Oenophilia
- Okazu
- Opson
- Opsophagos
- OREC
- Overfishing
- Online food ordering

=== P ===
- Parbaking
- Pasteurization
- Persistence hunting
- Pescetarianism
- Placentophagy
- Preservation
- Pickling
- Pink slime
- Politics of food in the Arab-Israeli conflict
- Portable stove
- Prebiotic
- Preservatives
- Pressure cooking
- Pressure frying
- Probiotic
- Protein

=== Q ===
- Quality Wines Produced in Specified Regions

=== R ===
- Rocket stove
- Rotisserie
- Root vegetable

=== S ===
- Sannakji
- Sashimi
- Sautéing
- Savoury (small dish)
- Seasoning
- Shark finning
- Siu mei
- Slow Food
- Soup
- Soy
- Spice
- Starvation
- Surimi
- Sushi
- Sustainability
- Sustainable food system

=== T ===
- Taste
- Tea culture
- Teppanyaki
- Teriyaki
- Terroir
- Trans fat
- Trophic dynamics
- Tropical agriculture
- Tureen

=== U ===
- Umami
- Underweight
- Unsaturated fat
- Urban agriculture
- USDA National Nutrient Database

=== V ===
- Veganism
- Vegetarianism
- Vertical farming
- Vitamin
- Vitamin c megadosage
- Viticulture

=== W ===
- Water
- Wedding cake
- Weight cutting
- Weight loss
- Whole grain stamp
- Wildlife
- Wine
- World food day
- World food prize
- World food programme

=== X ===
- Xanthan gum

=== Y ===
- Yakiniku
- Yakisoba
- Yakitori
- Ye wei
- Yum cha
- Yo-yo effect

== Food history ==
- Ancient Egyptian cuisine
- Ancient Greek cuisine
- Ancient Roman cuisine
- Bulldog gravy
- Cuisine of the Thirteen Colonies
- Early modern European cuisine
- History of Chinese cuisine
- History of South Asian cuisine
- Medieval cuisine
- Opson and sitos
- Ottoman cuisine
- History of alcohol
- History of agricultural science
- History of chocolate
- History of coffee
- History of beer
- History of breastfeeding
- History of pizza
- History of saffron
- History of salt
- History of sherry
- History of sugar
- History of sushi
- History of vegetarianism

=== Wine history ===
- Alban wine
- Ancient Greece and wine
- Ancient Rome and wine
- Caecuban wine
- Chian wine
- Coan wine
- Conditum Paradoxum
- Cretan wine
- Falernian wine
- Great French Wine Blight
- Fumarium
- History of wine
- History of American wine
- History of Bordeaux wine
- History of California wine
- History of French wine
- History of Oregon wine production
- History of Rioja wine
- Hypocras
- Lesbian wine
- Marriage at Cana
- Passum
- Persian wine
- Police des Vins
- Retsina
- Shedeh
- Shirazi wine
- Vino Greco

== Food-related lists ==
- List of basic cooking topics
- List of food companies

=== Additives and preservatives ===
- Foods containing tyramine
- List of food additives
- List of food additives, Codex Alimentarius
- List of unrefined sweeteners

=== Cultivars ===
- Apple
- Basil
- Capsicum
- Mango
- Pear
- Strawberry

=== Edible lists ===
==== Food ====
- Culinary fruits
- Vegetables
- Culinary herbs and spices
- Grape varieties
- Culinary nuts
- Edible seeds
- Edible flowers
- Edible leaves
- Soups
- Raw fish dishes
- Sushi and sashimi ingredients

===== Cheese =====
- List of cheeses
- American cheese
- British cheese
- Dutch cheese
- French cheese
- Italian cheese
- Irish cheese
- Cheeses of Switzerland
- Greek PDO cheeses
- Italian PDO cheese

==== Beverages ====
- Glossary of wine terms
- List of alcoholic beverages
- List of liqueurs
- List of non-alcoholic cocktails
- List of soft drinks by country
- List of Appellation d'Origine Contrôlée liqueurs and spirits
- List of Appellation d'Origine Contrôlée wines
- List of Italian DOC wines
- List of Italian DOCG wines
- List of Italian IGT wines
- List of beer styles
- List of commercial brands of beer

=== Miscellaneous ===
- List of co-operative federations
- List of cuisines
- List of diets
- List of famines
- List of food preparation utensils
- List of Japanese cooking utensils
- List of geographical designations for spirit drinks in the European Union

== See also ==
=== Foodborne illness outbreaks ===
- Canada
- United States

=== Environmental ===
- Fishing
- Meat production
- Pesticides

=== Measurements ===
- Cooking weights and measures
- Gastronorm sizes
- Zadoks scale

=== Professional associations ===
- Academy of Nutrition and Dietetics
- Cereals & Grains Association
- Feeding America
- Food and Agriculture Organization (United Nations)
- International Food Policy Research Institute
- International Fund for Agricultural Development

=== Miscellaneous ===
- Alcohol laws of the United States by state
- Fisheries glossary
- "The Big Eight" food Allergies
- Glossary of terms associated with diabetes
- List of countries by alcohol consumption
- Population dynamics of fisheries
- Taboo food and drink
