= Food politics =

Field of politics

Food politics is the government policy, legislation, but public discourse around all aspects of the food system, including production, control, regulation, inspection, distribution and consumption of commercially and home grown food.

All aspects of the food system are affected by economic, ethical, cultural and health concerns. Food production has environmental impacts such as water usage and climate change. Many technologies used for food production, such as pesticides or genetically modified organisms (GMOs) crops, have been subject to regulation and public debate. For food supply chains, trade, and retail, food politics also encompasses the international food market, food aid, food security, food sovereignty, labor practices and the regulation of all of these things. More broadly, discourse around the role of food systems in social and economic inequality, public health issues such as obesity, and cultural heritage are all part of food politics.

== Policy ==
Government policies around food production, distribution, and consumption influence the cost, availability, and safety of the food supply domestically and internationally. On a national scale, food policy work affects farmers, food processors, wholesalers, retailers and consumers. Commodity crops, such as corn, rice, wheat, and soy are most often at the heart of agricultural policy-making.

Historian Xaq Frohlich in 2017 observed an 'informational turn' in food politics in recent decades, as governments respond to food-related issues by mandating transparency (e.g. detailed information labels, such as Nutrition Facts labels) rather than direct bans or mandates. This approach positions consumer choice – guided by labels – as a primary way to govern food markets.

While most food policy is initiated domestically, there are international ramifications. Globally, protectionist trade policies, international trade agreements, famine, political instability, and development aid are among the primary influences on food policy. Increasingly, climate change concerns are gaining the attention of those most concern with ensuring an adequate worldwide food supply.

== Gastronationalism ==
Sociologist Michaela DeSoucey in 2010 described gastronationalism as the use of food and its history, production, control, and consumption as a way of promoting nationalism. It may involve arguments between two or more regions or countries about whether a particular dish or preparation is claimed by one of those regions or countries and has been appropriated or co-opted by the others.

Atsuko Ichijo and Ronald Ranta have called food "fundamentally political" and "one of the essential commodities with which political powers at various levels are concerned". Food historian Michelle T. King suggests that cuisine is a natural focus for studies of nationalism, pointing out dozens of such treatments over the first decades of the 21st century. Examples of gastronationalism include efforts by state bodies, nongovernmental bodies, businesses and business groups, and individuals.

New York University professor Fabio Parasecoli has defined food as an expression of identity. Conflict between two or more regions or countries about whether a particular dish or preparation is claimed by one of those regions or countries and has been appropriated or co-opted by the others is not uncommon, especially in areas where there has been violent conflict. Dishes affected by these culinary wars tend to be those with "a clearly symbolic ethnic significance". They also tend to be dishes that "represent territorial aspirations" and can be developed and prepared only by settled – and therefore indigenous – peoples.

Mary Douglas said "national food cultures become a blinding fetish which, if disregarded, may be as dangerous as an explosion".

In 2006 researcher Liora Gvion argued that cuisines of poverty – typically, traditional foods – "reveal the inter-connection between the culinary discourse and the political one" and that the issue was tied up with those of access to land and national identity.

According to DeSoucey, gastronationalism uses food to promote a sense of national identity and affects how members of the national community develop "national sentiments and taste preferences for certain foods."

Kingston University's Ranta in 2018 said a group's claims to a particular food become important when a "cause or agenda is behind the claim", citing the politics of food in the Arab-Israeli conflict as an example.

== Technology ==
As with many industries, the food industry has experienced growth in the capacity to produce food with the use of improved technologies. In developed countries, there are a number of important trends at play. Yields, or the amount of food harvested per acre of cropland, have increased less than one percent per year in since at least the 1960s and the amount of land devoted to crop use is in decline due to development pressures for housing and other economic concerns. In the U.S. alone, about 3000 acres of productive farmland are lost each day.

This places a premium on quality yields from existing acres of farmland. In addition, the demand for meat products worldwide, expected to double by 2020, has accelerated a trend toward raising more animals on fewer acres of land.

=== Farming of animals ===
More intensive forms of animal farming have largely replaced traditional methods of raising pigs, cattle, poultry and fish for human consumption in the U.S. The increased development of Concentrated Animal Feeding Operations have been associated with increased risk of foodborne illnesses from E.coli, environmental degradation, and increased emissions of ammonia, carbon dioxide, and methane into the air. In addition to food safety and environmental concerns, organizations such as the People for the Ethical Treatment of Animals and the Humane Society of the United States (HSUS) have drawn attention to a range of practices that allow for the more efficient raising of animals for meat consumption, but these practices stress the animals, the land on which they are raised and the supply of food for human consumption. In a recent report on industrialized animal agriculture, HSUS called on people in Western countries to shift to a plant-based diet because half the world's grain crop is used to raise animals for meat, eggs, and milk. Fish farming has also come under scrutiny due to high concentrations of fish in smaller spaces than is experienced in the wild. For both land and water animals, the prophylactic use of antibiotics to promote growth and stem the spread of infection among the animals has also been questioned due to concerns that this practice may contribute to strains of antibiotic-resistant bacteria.

=== Genetically modified foods ===
The use of genetically modified organism seeds to grow commodity and other crops in the U.S. has drawn criticism from organizations such as Greenpeace, The Non-GMO Project, and the Organic Consumers Association among others. Concerns center on both food safety and the erosion of agricultural biodiversity. While the European Union regulates genetically engineered foods as they would any other new product requiring extensive testing to provide it is safe for human consumption, the U.S. does not. The Food and Drug Administration generally considers a food with origins from genetically modified organisms (GMO) to be as safe as its conventional counterpart.

Numerous studies have backed industry claims that GMO foods appear to be safe for human consumption, including an examination of more than 130 research projects conducted in the European Union prior to 2010 and work published by the American Medical Association's Council on Science and Public Health.

In the U.S., the political debate has centered primarily on whether or not to label products with GMO origins to better inform the public about the content of the foods they purchase. A statewide ballot question that would have mandated labeling of GMO products in California was defeated in 2012. The measure, known as Proposition 37 was leading by a wide margin in early polling but was defeated after an advertising blitz bankrolled by Monsanto, the largest supplier of genetically engineered seeds, as well as Kraft Foods, Coca-Cola, PepsiCo, and other large food business interests. The ballot question's results were closely watched across the country as advocates for the measure hoped that it would pass and spur the federal government to mandate labeling of GMO foods as well.

In the wake of the labeling law proposal's defeat, an organization called March Against Monsanto was formed to continue to keep alive the public debate about labeling GMO food products. In 2013, a ballot initiative that would have required labels on GMO foods sold in the state of Washington was defeated by voters, again after a campaign against the initiative was led by major food companies.

=== Pesticide use ===
Among the much-heralded impacts of the Green Revolution was the spread of technological advances in the development of pesticides to ensure higher crop yields. Health effects of pesticides have led to a number of regulatory and non-regulatory efforts to control potential harm to human health from these chemicals in the food supply. The US Environmental Protection Agency has jurisdiction of the use of pesticides in crop management and sets tolerances for trace amounts of pesticides that may be found in the food supply. About 12,000 samples of fruits and vegetables available to U.S. consumers are collected each year and tested for residue from pesticides and the results are published in an annual Pesticide Data Program (PDP) hosted by the USDA.

=== Big food ===
Food manufacturing and processing is a heavily concentrated industry. The 10 largest food companies in the United States control more than half of all food sales domestically and a growing percentage of packaged food and beverage products on store shelves worldwide. Ranked by food sales, PepsiCo, Inc. is the largest food manufacturer in the U.S., followed by Tyson Foods, Nestlé, JBS USA, and Anheuser-Busch, according to a 2013 list published by Food Processing magazine. Big food influence is evident in Washington, D.C. where companies spend millions on lobbying each year, many of whom are members of the Consumer Goods Forum. Lobbying benefits large corporations whose deep pockets and connections get them special access to lawmakers, regulators and other influential officials.

According to figures from the United States Census Bureau from 2007, the most highly concentrated food industries in the country included cane sugar refining, breakfast cereals, bottled water, and cookie/cracker manufacturing using the 4-firm concentration ratio. Consolidation of this industry took place in the 1970s and 1980s through a series of mergers and acquisitions.

"Big food" has come under fire not only because a small number of players are responsible for a large percentage of the food supply chain, but because of concerns about the links between the highly processed foods they produce and the obesity epidemic both in the U.S. and worldwide. A report from Global Health Advocacy Incubator documents the food industry's strategies to defeat warning labels on ultra-processed food products (UPP).

The director general of the World Health Organization, in a speech given at the 8th Global Conference on Health Promotion in Helsinki, Finland in June 2013, noted that the public health community's efforts to combat chronic diseases such as diabetes, hypertension and cardiovascular disease are pitted against the economic interests of the powerful food industry.

Moreover, major investors can hold interests across both food and pharmaceutical companies, potentially creating a "win-win" in which food-related health problems and their treatment generate value across the same investment portfolios.

Marketing and other strategies of the food industry have been compared to those of the tobacco industry at the height of its influence in the consumer marketplace. In response, the food industry has engaged in some voluntary efforts to improve the nutritional content of their foods. In 2005, General Mills announced a plan to ensure that all of its breakfast cereals contained at least eight grams of whole grain per serving. In 2006, Campbell Soup Company announced an initiative to reduce sodium in its products by at least 25 percent. Due to slumping sales, Campbell's acknowledged that it was adding more sodium back into some of its soups in 2011.

The World Health Organization published a report in 2022 which highlights food marketing is especially prevalent where children are and what they watch on TV. Predominantly promoting ultra-processed food which includes sugar-sweetened beverages, and chocolate and confectionery. It confirms food marketing is pervasive, persuasive and bad for health.

=== Food movements ===
A cultural backlash against an increasingly mechanized food industry has taken a number of different forms.

- Local food is a movement to shift food expenditures by individuals, families, community organizations, schools, restaurants, and other institutions from foods produced and shipped long distances by larger corporate entities to regional farmers and other local producers of food. Small farming interests, relatively heterogeneous products and short supply chains characterize local food markets, though there is no agreed-upon measure of the distances that constitute "local." Community-supported agriculture is a mechanism for connecting consumers with local farmers. Farm-to-table efforts are also part of the local food movement.
- Meatless Monday is a public health awareness campaign encouraging individuals and families to eat a meat-free diet at least once each week. Launched in 2003 through the Johns Hopkins Center for a Livable Future, its focus is on preventable diseases associated with excessive meat consumption but the campaign has also been incorporated by many concerned about sustainable agriculture and the environment.
- Slow Food is an international movement founded in Italy in 1986, with Slow Food USA established in 2000. The organization stands in opposition to "the standardization of taste and culture, and the unrestrained power of food industry multinationals and industrial agriculture."

Among those influential in the food movement in the United States are writers, including Michael Pollan and Marion Nestle, and celebrity chefs such as Alice Waters, Mario Batali and Jamie Oliver. Popular books and movies on contemporary topics in food include Fast Food Nation, The Omnivore's Dilemma and the documentary Food, Inc. In 2011, the president of the American Farm Bureau Federation referred to this influential group as "self-appointed food elitists" and the Washington Post published an op-ed from Eric Schlosser, author of Fast Food Nation, defending the work he and colleagues have done to improve food systems in the United States.

=== Social justice ===
While the production and distribution of food is primarily an economic activity, advocates for a variety of social justice concerns are increasingly aware of the role that food policy plays in issues of greatest concern to causes they espouse.

==== Biofuel mandates and food supply ====
The interests of varied sectors of the agricultural industry are not always in alignment as illustrated by tensions stemming from a drought in 2012 that affected domestic corn production. Described as the most severe and extensive drought in the U.S. in the last 25 years by the USDA Economic Research Service, thousands of acres of mostly corn and soy fields in the Midwest were damaged or destroyed.

This led to increased pressure on the federal government from some domestic farmers and international anti-hunger organizations to relax the Renewable Fuel Standard that call for a portion of the US-grown corn supply to be set aside for ethanol production. Meat and poultry producers, both of whom rely on corn for animal feed and feared rising prices due to the drought conditions, accused the federal government of "picking winners and losers" with its ethanol policy while ethanol producers, many of whom are corn farmers, argued that price spikes would affect them as well and that ethanol production had been scaled back.

==== Domestic food aid ====
Offering government food assistance to the lowest income Americans dates back to the administration of President Franklin D. Roosevelt and has continued into the 21st century. In FY 2011, the budget for the USDA Food and Nutrition Service, which is responsible for the major feeding programs, was $107 billion. The largest single food assistance program in the country is the Supplemental Nutrition Assistance Program, the provisions for which are contained in a Farm Bill that is re-authorized by Congress and signed by the president every five years. Benefits to SNAP recipients cost approximately $75 billion in 2012. Largely uncontroversial for most of its history, the SNAP program was targeted for major cuts by members of the House of Representatives in the 2012 Farm Bill re-authorization attempt.

House leaders also endeavored to separate the SNAP program from the Farm Bill, splitting the long-standing coalition of urban and rural legislators who traditionally backed the renewals of funding for the Farm Bill every five years.

Increases in the size of the SNAP caseload during the early 2000s were associated with increases in the unemployment rate and with a number of policy changes made to the program in many states. A series of six measures to better understand employment trends developed by the Bureau of Labor Statistics, three of which are more conservative estimates of unemployment and three of which define it more broadly, all showed correlations with SNAP participation. In particular, it was suggested that longer-term unemployment results in the heaviest utilization of SNAP benefits.

In addition to concerns about the cost of the program from fiscal conservatives, leaders in the movement to improve the nutritional content of the American diet suggested changes to the program to preclude the purchase of sugar-sweetened soft drinks or other forms of junk food with low nutritional value. In fact, the House of Representatives' version of the initial Food Stamp Act of 1964 prohibited using food stamps for the purchase of soft drinks, but the provision was not adopted.

Efforts to more narrowly define the food purchases by SNAP recipients were derided by anti-hunger organizations as a form of paternalism. The 2008 Farm Bill re-authorization established the Healthy Incentives Pilot, a $20 million effort in five states to learn if offering select SNAP recipients credits on purchases of fresh, frozen, canned, or dried fruits and vegetables with no added sugar, salt, fat, or oil will result in increased purchases of these foods. Results of the pilot study were expected in 2014.

In addition to advocacy work in Washington, D.C., on behalf of those in poverty, public awareness campaigns around the constraints faced by families receiving SNAP were launched. The food stamp challenge or SNAP challenge is one mechanism used by advocates such as Feeding America. Individuals are challenged to restrict food spending for a week to levels typical for families receiving SNAP benefits.

==== Labor and immigration ====
Hired farmworkers are among the most economically disadvantaged groups in the United States. Farm labor statistics are published twice yearly by the National Agricultural Statistics Service, a division of the U.S. Department of Agriculture and are compared with similar data from the prior year. In April 2013, the number of workers hired by farm operators was 732,000. Field workers received an average pay of $10.92 per hour and livestock workers earned $11.46 hourly. Average hourly rates for field and livestock work have been on the rise since 1990. Language barriers, fear of deportation, frequent re-locations, and lack of voting status have contributed to difficulties in organizing farm laborers to advocate for wage, benefit, and working condition reforms.

The agricultural industry's reliance on non-native workers has become part of the political debate over immigration policies and enforcement in the country. United States Department of Labor statistics from 2009 indicated that about 50 percent of hired crop workers were not legally authorized to work in the U.S., a figure that remained largely unchanged over the course of the prior decade. During that same time period, intense debate took place in the nation's capital regarding immigration policies and enforcement. Farm interests, concerned about access to a steady workforce, worked on Capitol Hill to secure their interests in the Border Security, Economic Opportunity, and Immigration Modernization Act of 2013. Provisions favored by the farm lobby included: "earned adjustments" that will allow for temporary legal immigration status based on past experience with the possibility of applying for permanent residency by continuing to work in agriculture for a set period of time; and a more flexible guest worker program for agricultural workers.

In addition to farm labor, workers in the nation's food service industry garnered attention in 2012 and 2013 with a series of strikes against fast food outlets demanding higher wages, better working conditions, and the right to form unions. A study by the Labor Center at the University of California, Berkeley in October 2013 demonstrated that 52 percent of families of fast-food workers receive public assistance, in comparison to 25 percent of the workforce as a whole. According to the study, full-time hours were not sufficient to compensate for low wages.

== Security ==
In the past, the denial of food deliveries has been used as a weapon in war. For example, during both world wars, the British naval blockade was intended to starve Germany into submission.

Food security is an important political issue as national leaders attempt to maintain control of sufficient food supplies for their nation. It can drive national policy, encourage the use of subsidies to stimulate farming, or even lead to conflict. This is mostly a national policy because nations have only recognized that there is a negative duty to not disrupt other nations food supply and do not require that one help them attain such secure access by protecting them against other threats.

In 1974, the World Food Summit defined food security as:

availability at all times of adequate world food supplies of basic foodstuffs to sustain a steady expansion of food consumption and to offset fluctuations in production and prices

=== In MENA politics ===
According to a 2012 report by Georgetown University in Qatar, "There are three traditional routes to national food security: 1) domestic production, which contributes to self-sufficiency; 2) commercial food imports; and 3) international food aid". Therefore, we need to make it clear that there is a distinction "between self-sufficiency and food security, in that the former is only one possible route to food security at the national level".

Since 2007/2008, multiple Middle Eastern and North African (MENA) region governments have begun to consider more domestic food production as a part of their national aggregate food security laws. Although from a political view that approach may be justified due to it helping in stabilizing domestic food prices and deducting vulnerability to international markets and reliance on other countries, it comes at an enormous economic cost. This due to the resource endowments of the majority "of MENA countries—water scarcity and lack of arable land—are not well-suited to food production", specifically cereal production, and "these countries' comparative international advantages lie in other economic activities".

Many of "the international organizations involved in the MENA economies during the 1990s and the 2000s advocated a food security strategy for most countries" that based on diversification away from agriculture towards multiple other activities, "including manufacturing exports, with the resulting foreign exchange used to purchase food imports". "Within the agricultural sector there has also been emphasis on shifting resources into high- value crops that are most efficient in water use, such as fruits, vegetables, and tree crops", with a view on export markets, in replace of cereal production for domestic consumption.

== See also ==
- Agroecology
- Animal welfare
- Consumer Goods Forum
- Food and drink prohibitions
- Food marketing
- Free range
- List of food labeling regulations
- Global Food Security Act of 2009 (in the US)
- Grass fed beef
- Organic food
- Right to food
- Sustainable agriculture
- Ultra-processed food
- Vegetarianism
- Virtual water

== Bibliography ==
- Monbiot, G. (2000) Captive State, Basingstoke: Macmillan, pp. 162–208.
