= Politics of food in the Arab–Israeli conflict =

A significant facet of the Arab–Israeli conflict deals with a cultural struggle over national cuisines. Foods like falafel and hummus, which originated in Middle Eastern cuisine, have historically been politicized in general expressions of gastronationalism throughout the region. The development of Israeli cuisine occurred largely through the mixing of Jewish diasporic cuisines with Levantine cuisine, including Palestinian cuisine. This effort aided the effective definition of the national identity of Israel as that of a melting pot, but simultaneously prompted claims of cultural appropriation, particularly with regard to the Palestinian people. More specifically, critics of Israeli cuisine's incorporation of dishes that are traditionally seen as part of Arab cuisine assert that Israel lacks recognition for their Palestinian aspects, disqualifying the process as one of cultural diffusion. Opposition to Israeli cuisine in the Arab world revolves around the accusation that dishes of Palestinian origin, or other Arab dishes to which there have been significant Palestinian contributions, are presented by Israel in a way that suppresses or omits the role of the Palestinians in their development.

Although Middle Eastern foods were naturally part of Mizrahi Jewish cuisine before the development of Israeli cuisine, not all of them were exclusively Jewish foods and instead overlapped with Arab foods. As such, from the Palestinian perspective, the downplaying of Palestinian food within Israeli culture is widely regarded as an erasure of Palestinian culture and, as a result, of the Palestinian Arab identity as a whole, although there are Arab citizens of Israel who operate restaurants serving Palestinian cuisine.

Among the arguments put forth by Israeli culinary artists who oppose the Arab accusation of cultural appropriation is the fact that many of the disputed Middle Eastern foods of Israeli cuisine were as integral to Middle Eastern Jewish cuisines (i.e., of the Mizrahi Jews) as they were to Arab cuisines, thus qualifying them as Israeli as well, since they were popularized by Jewish migration from these lands. Israel's inclusion of Levantine cuisine is also regarded as a means of enabling other populations of the Jewish diaspora, such as Ashkenazi Jews, who saw themselves as returning to the region, to further reconnect with ancient Jewish civilization in the sense of recalling Israelite culinary traditions.

The politics of food between Arabs and Israeli Jews have also carried over globally, particularly in parts of the Western world, where some well-known modern Levantine dishes are Israeli, such as Israeli salad, which is closely related to Arab salad. The claiming of some of these foods as national dishes among Israel and the Arab countries has led to legal disputes at local and international levels, and has also served as the basis for culinary competitions between Israeli and Arab chefs. Overall, the phenomenon is ongoing as the subject of extensive debate between culinary anthropologists.

== Background ==
=== Food as politics ===
According to culinary anthropologist Yael Raviv, "David Bell and Gill Valentine, in Consuming Geographies (1997), see a certain paradox in the discussion of nation and food since the two seem 'so commingled in popular discourse that it is often difficult not to think of one through the other' ".

According to Alexander Lee, writing for History Today in 2019, "More often than not, arguments about the origins of falafel are refracted through the lens of political rivalries. Particularly for the Israelis and the Palestinians, ownership of this most distinctively Levantine dish is inexorably bound up with issues of legitimacy and national identity. By claiming falafel for themselves, they are each, in a sense, claiming the land itself – and dismissing the other as an interloper or occupier."

=== Between Israelis and Palestinians ===
Particularly after the 1948 creation of the State of Israel, Jews migrated from many parts of the world, where they had many different culinary cultures; these immigrants embraced local ingredients such as olives, olive oil, lemons and lemon juice, and oranges and regionally traditional foods such as falafel and hummus, absorbing these ingredients and dishes into diasporic Jewish foodways to create an Israeli cuisine.

According to Palestinian writer Reem Kassis, food was one of the items used "to achieve a sense of Israeli nationalism". Writing about the distinction between cultural diffusion and cultural appropriation and explaining the Palestinian objection to an "Israeli cuisine" that includes Palestinian dishes, Kassis says that "presenting dishes of Palestinian provenance as 'Israeli' not only denies the Palestinian contribution to Israeli cuisine, but it erases our very history and existence." Raviv argued that "Israelis' choice of falafel and hummus as markers of identity should perhaps be perceived as a reflection of their wish to become part of the Middle East" and used the development of this cuisine and the foods themselves as unifying symbols. Traditional foods of the region were seen as "biblical" foods, the adoption of which would allow Jews who saw themselves as returning to the region of their historical roots to reconnect with the past.

== Dishes ==
The cuisine of Israel includes Mizrahi Jewish cuisine: the cuisine of the Jews of North Africa and the Middle East, who arrived in large numbers after 1948. Many restaurants in Israel also serve Palestinian cuisine and cater to Arab citizens of Israel as well as the other citizens, who eat there together.

As well as hummus and falafel, other dishes such as ka'ak, shakshuka, labneh, knafeh, tabouleh, maftoul, za'atar, shawarma, and fallahi salad have been incorporated into Israeli cuisine, often being renamed. Some of the dishes, including hummus, falafel, msabaha, baba ghanoush, and knafeh have come to be considered national dishes in Israel; according to Palestinian cookbook author Reem Kassis, Israeli scholars Ilan Baron, Dafna Hirsch, Yonatan Mendel, and Ronald Ranta have determined that the dishes were likely learned from Palestinian cooks.

In some cases, migration of Jews was from areas where these foods were already traditional to the local food culture. Yotam Ottolenghi and Sami Tamimi write that hummus "is undeniably a staple of the local Palestinian population, but it was also a permanent feature on dinner tables of Aleppine Jews who have lived in Syria for millennia and then arrived in Jerusalem in the 1950s and 1960s".

Characterizations of hummus and falafel being adopted into Israeli cuisine date back to at least the 1960s; found in the commentary of Syrian sociologist Sadiq Jalal al-Azm.

=== Falafel ===
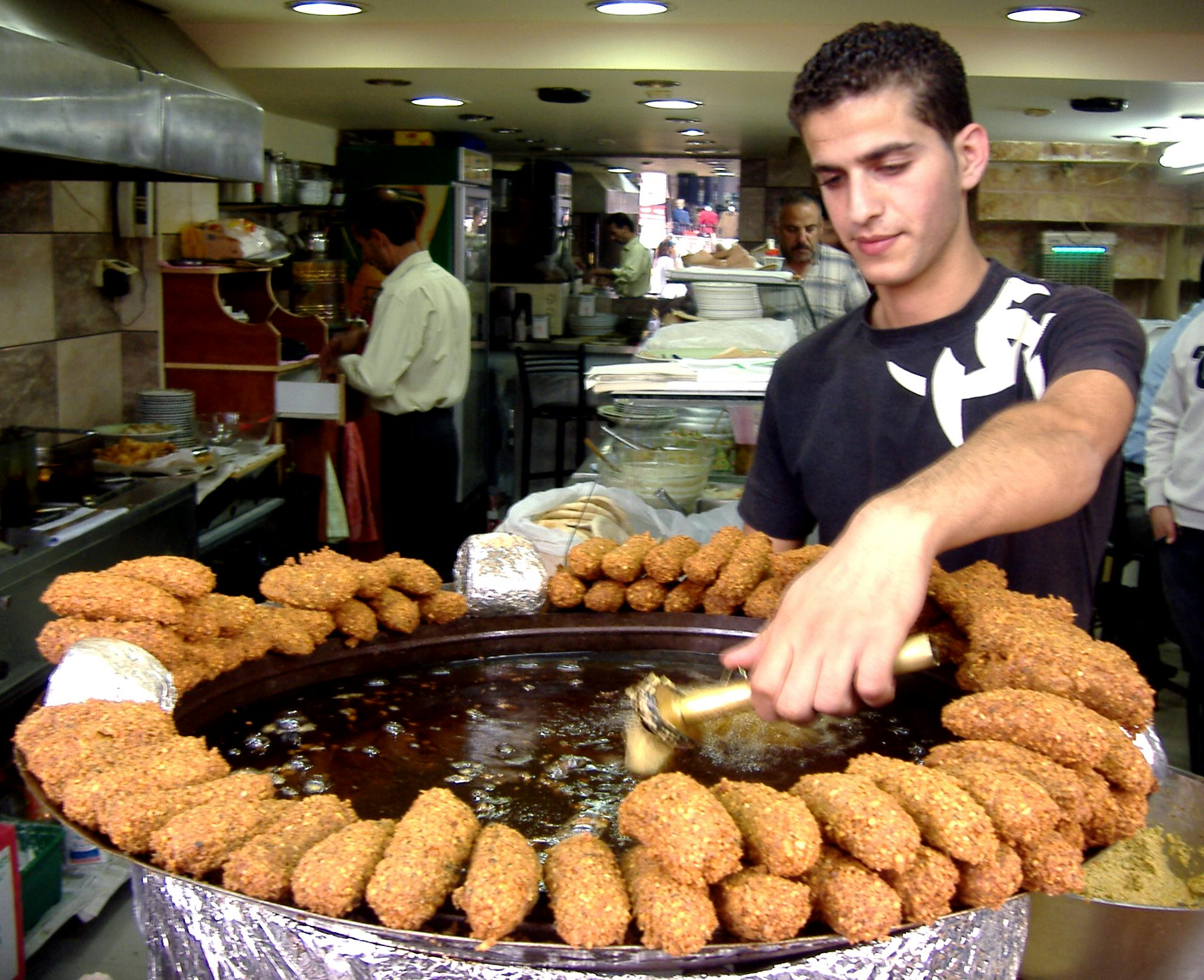
Preparation of falafel at a Palestinian shop in Ramallah, part of the Israeli-occupied West Bank, 2007

The origin of falafel is uncertain. The dish most likely originated in Egypt, possibly influenced by Indian cooking.

Arguments over the relative importance of falafel in various cuisines is an example of gastronationalism. In particular, discussion centers around the adoption of the dish into Israeli cuisine as an example of cultural appropriation. The Palestinian version of the falafel, made with chickpeas, has been adopted into Israeli cuisine, where it now features prominently and has been called a national dish of Israel – an attribution that Palestinians and other Arabs have criticized.

While according to author Claudia Roden, falafel was "never specifically a Jewish dish" in Syria and Egypt, it was consumed by Syrian and Egyptian Jews, and was adopted in the diet of early Jewish immigrants to the Jewish communities of Ottoman Syria. As it is plant-based, Jewish dietary laws classify it as pareve and thus allow it to be eaten with both meat and dairy meals.

Journalist Dorothy Kahn Bar-Adon wrote in 1941 that “since the outbreak of war domestic science institutions have been advocating the use of local products" but that there was a "wall of resistance", and that many Eastern Europeans were reluctant to use local foods. Dafna Hirsch of the Open University of Israel, wrote that despite this initial reluctance, "several ingredients from the Palestinian repertoire did penetrate many Jewish kitchens by the early 1940s, mostly vegetables like olives, tomatoes, eggplants, and squashes. Prepared dishes, however, were rarely adopted, except for falafel, which became a popular street food in Tel Aviv by the late 1930s. Excluding consumption by immigrants from Arab countries, both falafel and, later, hummus seem to have been adopted mainly by the first generation of Jews born in the country." Some authors have disagreed on the politics of food and its relative merit as a topic in the conflict.

The Association of Lebanese Industrialists in 2008 brought a lawsuit against Israel seeking damages for lost revenues, claiming copyright infringement regarding the branding of Israeli falafel, hummus, tabbouleh, and other foods.

Jennie Ebeling, writing in Review of Middle East Studies, argued that "food in general is sacred in the Middle East and falafel specifically is loaded with issues of national identity." Some Palestinians and other Arabs have objected to the identification of falafel with Israeli cuisine as amounting to cultural appropriation. Kassis wrote that the dish has become a proxy for political conflict. Joseph Massad, a Jordanian-American professor at Columbia University, has called the characterization as Israeli of falafel and other dishes of Arab origin in American and European restaurants to be part of a broader issue of appropriation by "colonizers". Israeli chef and cookbook author Yotam Ottolenghi told Anthony Bourdain that Israelis had "made falafel their own, and everybody in the world, and everybody in the world think falafel is an Israeli food, but in actual fact it's as much a Palestinian food, even more so".

The dish and its politico-cultural significance were the subject of a 2013 documentary by Ari A. Cohen, Falafelism: The Politics of Food in the Middle East which attempted to use falafel symbolically to argue that Arabs and Israelis had much in common, including the fact that multiple Middle Eastern cuisines consider falafel to be central to their national identity, but according to Ebeling the film was "ultimately unable to contribute more than anecdotally to issues of Israeli appropriation of Arab cuisine and cultural coexistence between Palestinians and Israelis". According to the Toronto Star, Cohen intended the film to be about "the unifying power of falafel".

=== Hummus ===
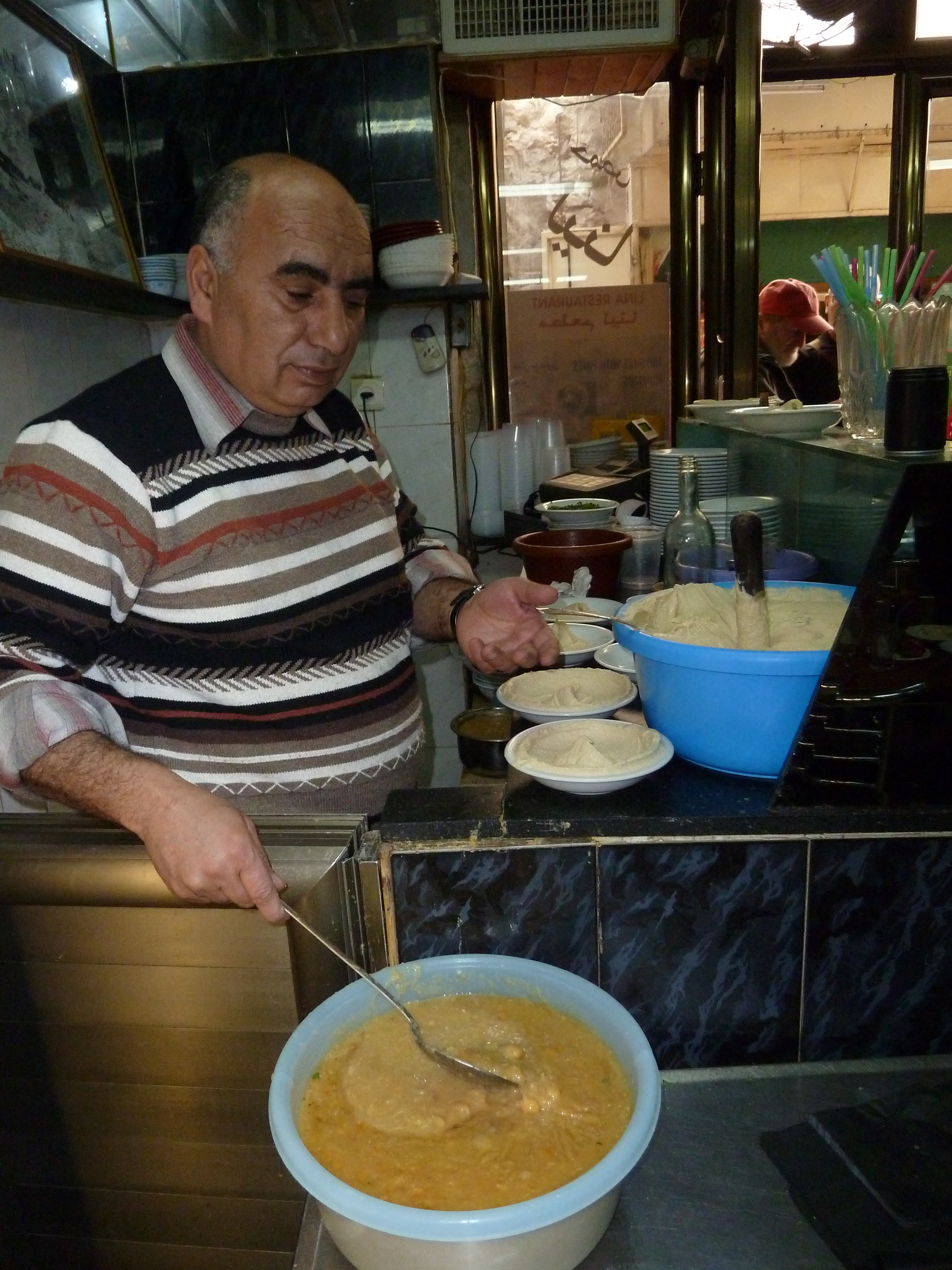
Preparation of hummus at a Palestinian restaurant in East Jerusalem, part of the Israeli-occupied West Bank, 2011

Although multiple different theories and claims of origins exist in various parts of the Middle East, evidence is insufficient to determine the precise location or time of the invention of hummus. However, the earliest known mention of hummus was in a 13th-century cookbook attributed to the Syrian historian Ibn al-Adim from present-day Syria. Its basic ingredients—chickpeas, sesame, lemon, and garlic—have been combined and eaten in Egypt and the Levant for centuries. Various academic theories argue the dish has its origins in Turkey, Syria, Lebanon, or Egypt.

Hummus is claimed as a national dish by Israel, Palestine, and Lebanon in a disagreement sometimes referred to as the "hummus wars".

Hummus is often seen as an unofficial "national dish" of Israel, reflecting its huge popularity and significance among the entire Israeli population, which Israel's critics describe as an appropriation of Lebanese, Palestinian or Arab culture. According to Ofra Tene and Dafna Hirsch, the dispute over ownership of hummus, exposes nationalism through food and the important role played by the industrialization of hummus made by Israeli private companies in 1958. Although hummus has traditionally been part of the cuisine of the Mizrahi Jews who lived in Arabic-speaking lands, the dish was also popularized among the Jewish immigrants from Europe in the late 19th and early 20th century. Historian Dafna Hirsch describes its adoption in their diet as part of an attempt of blending in the Middle Eastern environment, while sociologist Rafi Grosglick points out the importance of its health aspects to their diet. In recent years, through a process of gourmetization, the Arab identity of hummus became a marker of its authenticity, making famous Arab-Israeli villages such as Abu Gosh and Kafr Yasif. Hence, enthusiasts travel to the more remote Arab and Druze villages in the northern Galilee region in search of culinary experiences.

After Sabra, a US food company, created a marketing event using hummus, the Association of Lebanese Industrialists (ALI) created "Hands Off Our Dishes", a campaign claiming hummus as Lebanese and objecting to Sabra's marketing of the dish as Israeli. Fadi Abboud, then president of ALI and later tourism minister for Lebanon, threatened legal action against Israel for marketing hummus and other commercial food products as Israeli. Abboud characterized the hummus wars as being not about just hummus but about "the organized theft carried out by Israel" in connection to the culture of the entire Arab region.

In October 2008, the Association of Lebanese Industrialists petitioned to the Lebanese Ministry of Economy and Trade to request protected status from the European Commission for hummus as a uniquely Lebanese food, similar to the Protected Geographical Status rights held over regional food items by various European Union countries. As of 2009, the Lebanese Industrialists Association was still "collecting documents and proof" to support its claim.

The 2005 short film West Bank Story features a rivalry between two fictional restaurants, the Israeli "Kosher King" and the Palestinian "Hummus Hut". A parody of West Side Story, the film won the 2006 Academy Award for Best Live Action Short Film. In 2012, Australian filmmaker Trevor Graham released a documentary, Make Hummus Not War, on the political and gastronomic aspects of hummus.

Lebanon and Israel's chefs have been engaged in a competition over the largest dish of hummus, as validated by the Guinness World Record, as a form of contestation of "ownership". The "title" has gone back and forth between Israel (2008), Lebanon (2009), Israel (January 2010), and, as of 2021, Lebanon (May 2010). The winning dish, cooked by 300 cooks in the village of al-Fanar, near Beirut, weighed approximately 10,450 kilograms (23,040 lb), more than double the weight of the Israeli-Arab previous record. According to local media, the recipe included eight tons of boiled chick peas, two tonnes of tahini, two tonnes of lemon juice, and 70 kilograms (150 lb) of olive oil.

Israeli author Meir Shalev claims that ḥummuṣ was mentioned in the Hebrew Bible, specifically Ruth 2:14, as ḥomeṣ. Even though ḥomeṣ is translated as 'sour wine' in the 1989 New Revised Standard Version (NRSV) (Ruth 2:14), as 'vinegar' in the 1917 Jewish Publication Society of America Version (Ruth 2:14) as well as the 1985 New Jewish Publication Society of America Tanakh, and means 'vinegar' in modern Hebrew, Shalev traces ḥomeṣ and ḥummuṣ as well as ḥimṣa "chickpea" to one Semitic root ḥ-m-ṣ and claims that chickpeas are named thus in Hebrew owing to their rapid fermentation. However, Bristol-based author Harriet Nussbaum criticizes Shalev's identification of ḥomeṣ in Ruth 2:14 with ḥummuṣ: while accepting the linguistic connection proposed by Shalev, Nussbaum objects that ḥomeṣ might not be ḥummuṣ but just another dish seasoned or preserved with fermented foodstuffs; and even if ḥomeṣ meant chickpeas, there is no proof that in Biblical times chickpeas were prepared in the same manner as ḥummuṣ is. Moreover, linguists Pelio Fronzaroli (1971) and Leonid Kogan (2011) reconstruct Proto-Semitic root *ḥmṣ̂- for Hebrew חֹמֶץ ḥomeṣ 'vinegar', Arabic حَامِض ḥāmiḍ 'to be sour; acid' and Jewish Palestinian Aramaic ḥmʕ.

=== Israeli salad ===
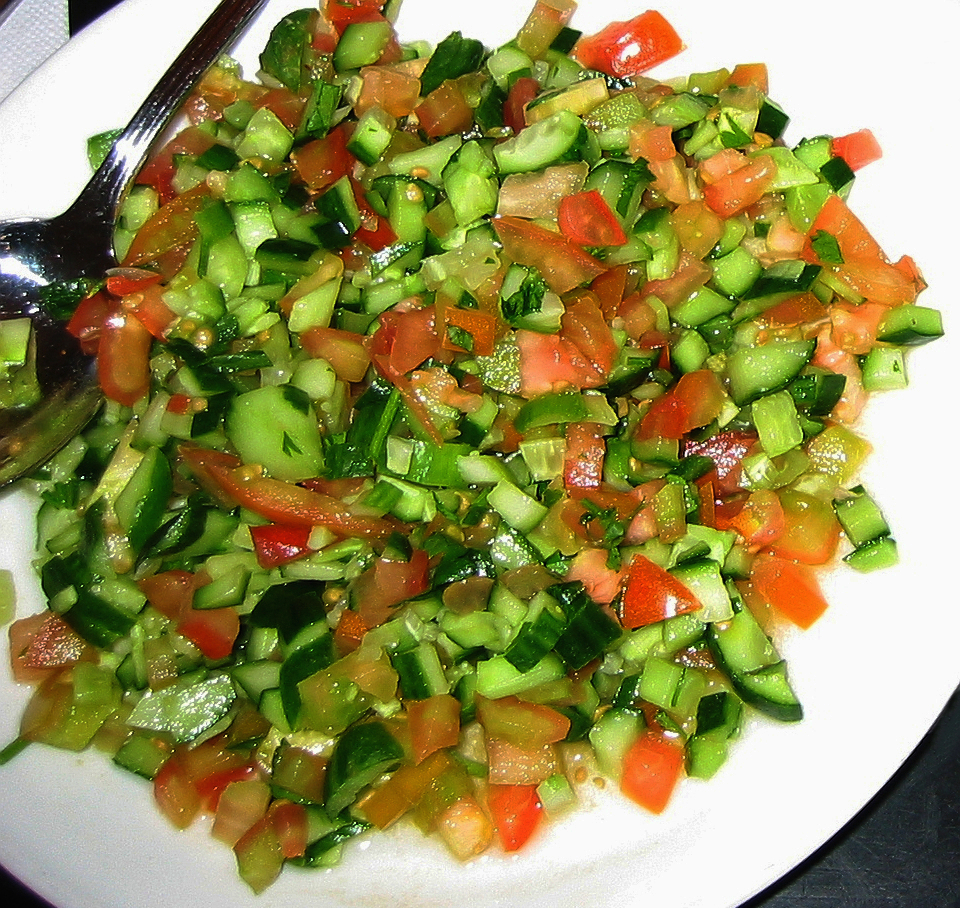
Israeli salad

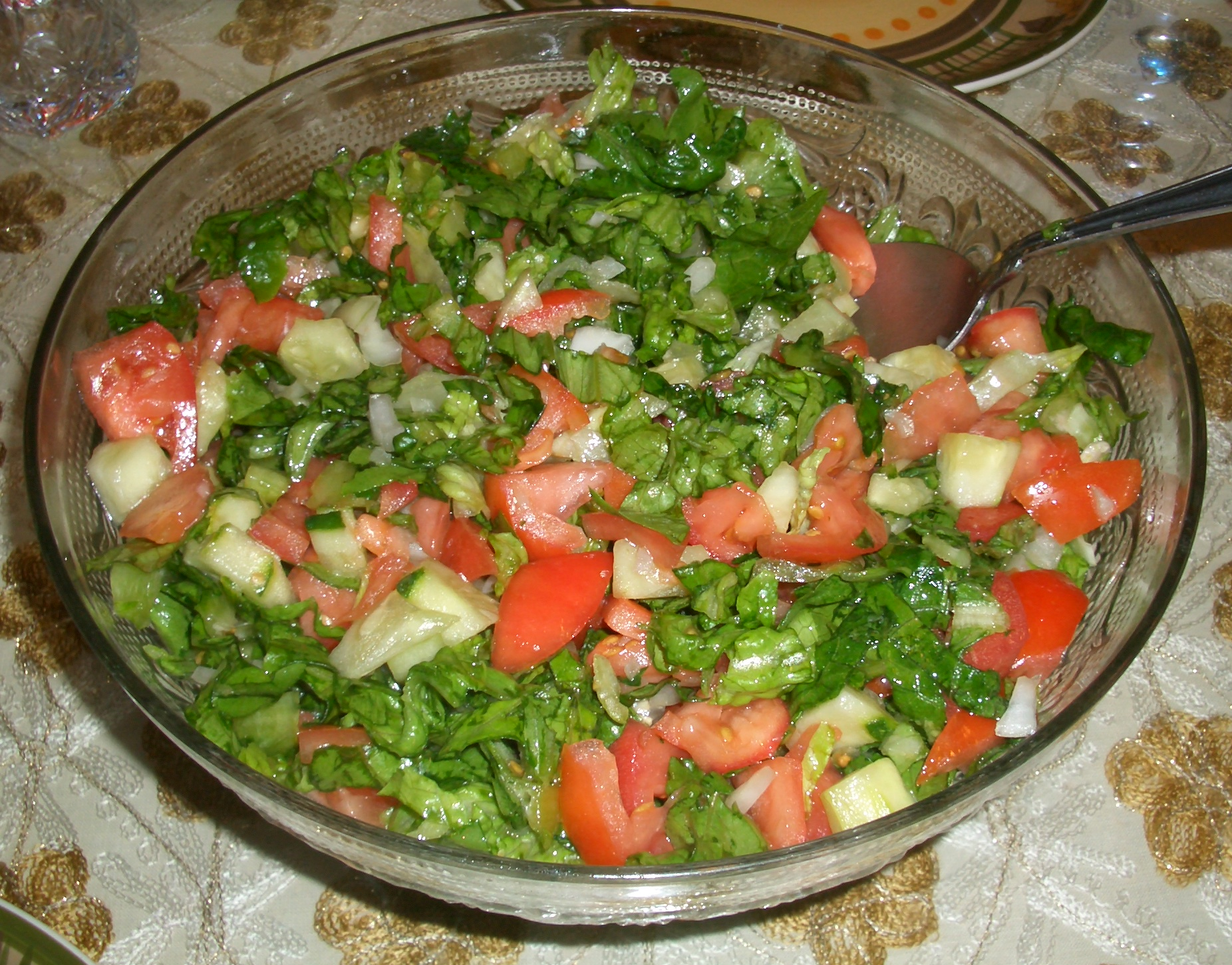
Arab salad

Israeli salad is a dish that was adopted by Jewish immigrants to the Levant in the late 19th century. It is akin to the popular Arab salad made with the locally grown Kirby cucumbers and tomatoes.

The name "Israeli Salad" is used mainly outside of Israel. Within Israel, it is commonly referred to as salat katzutz ("chopped salad"), salat aravi ("Arab salad"), or salat yerakot ("vegetable salad").

In an interview with the BBC, Israeli culinary journalist Gil Hovav said that the Israeli salad is in fact a Palestinian Arab salad. The idea that what is known in New York delis as "Israeli salad" stems from a Palestinian rural salad is agreed on by Joseph Massad, a Palestinian professor of Arab Politics at Columbia University, as an example of the appropriation of Palestinian and Syrian foods such as hummus, falafel, and tabbouleh by Israel as "national dishes".

=== Israeli couscous ===
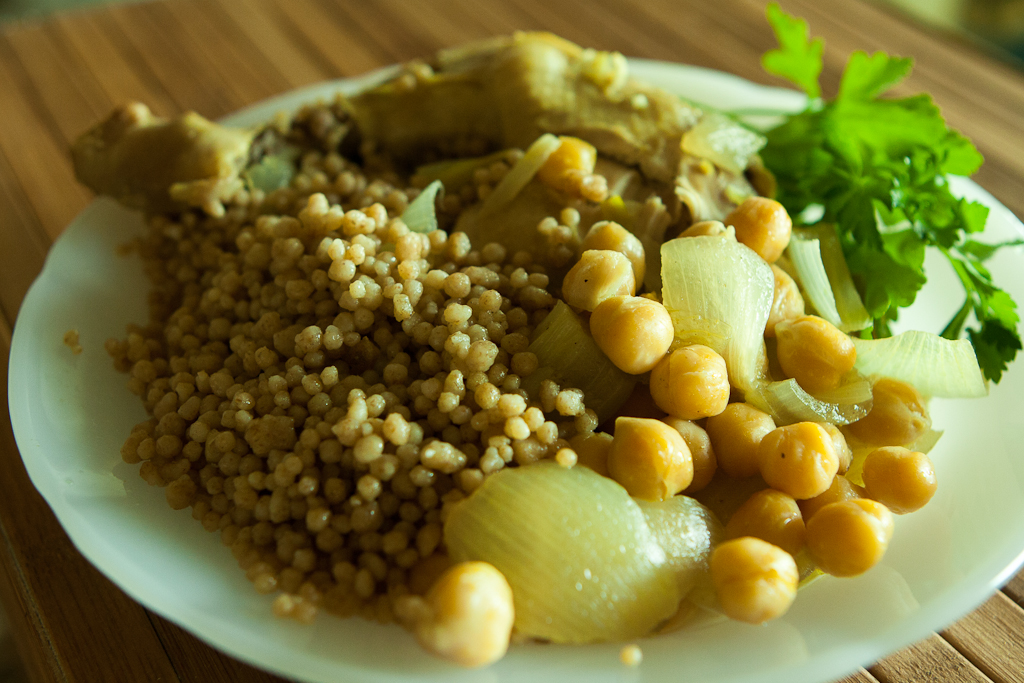
Maftoul, AKA Palestinian couscous

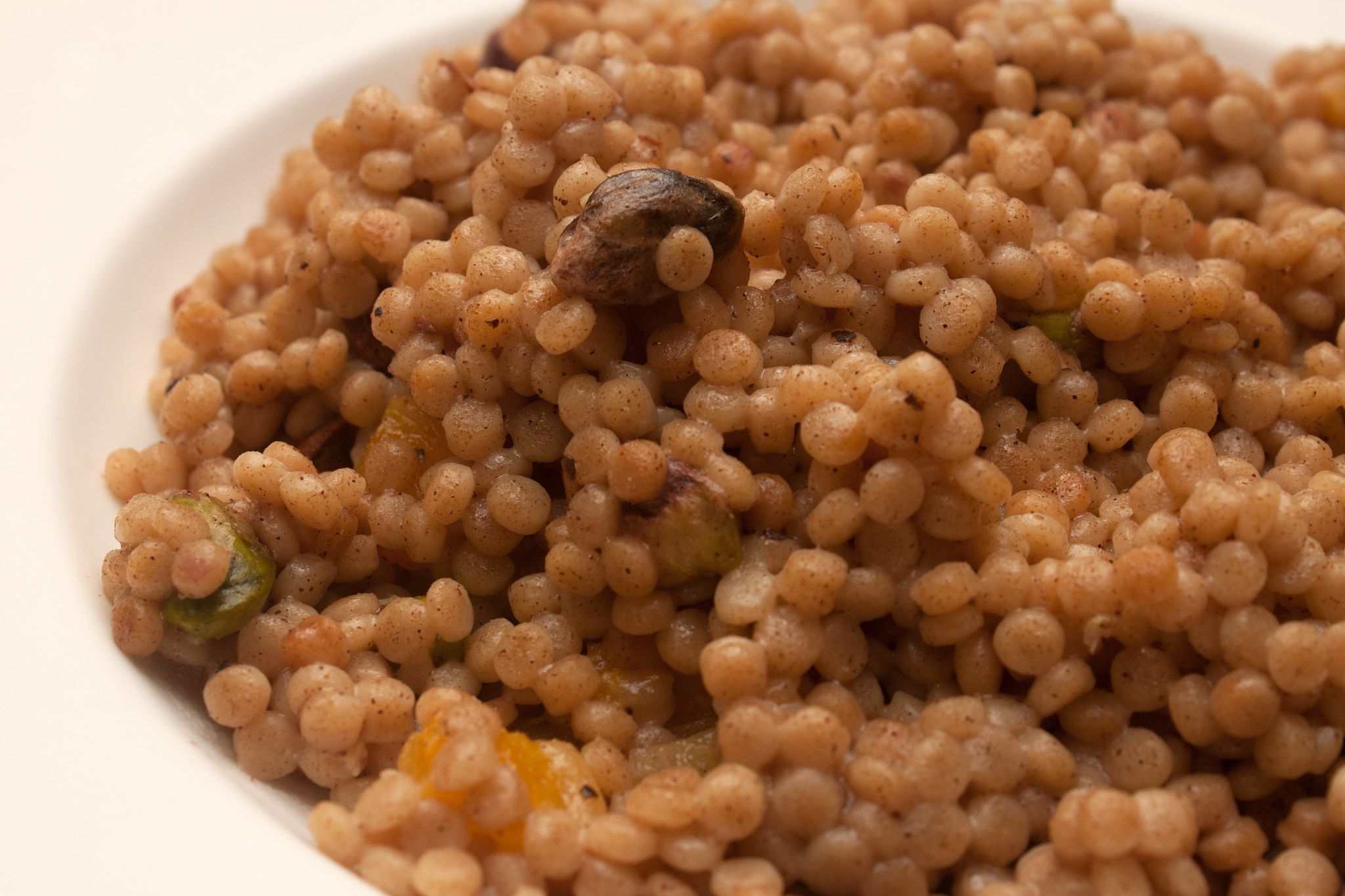
Ptitim, AKA Israeli couscous

Israeli couscous, which is called ptitim in Israel, is a type of extruded and toasted pasta consciously created as a poverty food in 1953 at the behest of then prime minister David Ben-Gurion during the austerity period in Israel. It is sometimes called "Ben-Gurion rice" or pearl couscous.

Joseph Massad objected to the term Israeli couscous and called it an example of how food in the Middle East had become "a target of colonial conquest", but Haaretz called the dish one of the few foods in Israeli cuisine that had not been incorporated from other cuisines, arguing that it and bamba were "more or less the only unique culinary contribution Israel has made to the world".

According to Ottolenghi and Tamimi, the popularity of Israeli couscous in Western countries, including its treatment as a trendy ingredient, "caused some resentment among Palestinians, whose maftoul isn't very different from ptitim, and among Lebanese, whose mograbieh, or Lebanese couscous, is similar to and only a bit larger than ptitim. Mograbieh, which literally means 'from North Africa,' clearly affirms its origin and source of inspiration through its name, while "Israeli couscous", claim the critics, does the exact opposite".

=== Maftoul ===
In 2018, airline company Virgin Atlantic faced social media backlash from Pro-Israel social media users over the naming of a dish on one of their menus. A couscous-salad was described as "inspired by the flavours of Palestine" on a menu for in-flight meals, where the main ingredient was maftoul, which is also referred to as "Palestinian couscous". Maftoul is a variation of couscous made from sundried bulgur wheat.

The airline faced calls for boycotts and accusations of having been influenced by the Boycott, Divestment and Sanctions movement over the naming. Following the criticism, Virgin Atlantic apologized for causing offence and complied with complaints from Pro-Israel users and then renamed the item to "Couscous Salad", which prompted backlash from Pro-Palestinian social media users.

== Characterization as appropriation ==
Over time, Israeli embrace of foods traditional to Middle East cuisine, and particularly those of Arab culture, was seen by critics as cultural appropriation. Kassis argues the concept of an Israeli cuisine that includes traditional Palestinian foods without acknowledging the foods' origins is an attempt to "[erase Palestinians'] very history and existence". Hovav told Haaretz, "Food is about memory and identity. Claiming ownership over a food is a way to assert a nation’s narrative. Israeli Jews have made hummus their own."

Kassis wrote that Israeli cookbooks and restaurant menus commonly name and attribute dishes that come from or are inspired by other Arab and Middle Eastern cuisines—such as referring to schug as "Yemeni schug” or to sabich (a Jewish food) as "Iraqi sabich"—but typically not in the case of Palestinian cuisine, since the Palestinian identity is the only one that is "considered by many Israelis as a threat to their existence" because of the Israeli–Palestinian conflict. She argued that "Food for Palestinians becomes a way to reclaim our country, if not geographically, at least psychologically and emotionally," adding "That’s why referencing traditional dishes adopted from Palestinians as Israeli without regard to their origin is seen as adding insult to injury: First the land, now the food and culture?"

Two dishes in particular, falafel and hummus, were embraced by Israel as markers of national identity. According to Raviv, "political conflict is an unavoidable part of the discussion of Zionist history, even food". Both dishes are commonly served at Jewish social gatherings outside of Israel.

During a 2008 interview with the BBC at the Palestinian restaurant Abu Shukri in Jerusalem, Hovav told his British counterpart Stefan Gates, who had asked him if hummus was originally a Jewish or Arab development: "Humous is Arabic. Falafel, our national dish, our national Israeli dish, is completely Arabic and this salad that we call an Israeli Salad, actually it’s an Arab salad, Palestinian salad. So, we sort of robbed them of everything." He added that during the Second Intifada, "Jews would risk their lives, sneak into the Muslim Quarter just to have a vital, really good genuine humous (from the Arab restaurants)".

== See also ==
- Gastronationalism
- Indigeneity in the Israeli-Palestinian conflict
- Politics of food
- Politics of archaeology in Israel and Palestine
