= Food studies =

Academic discipline

Food studies is the critical examination of food and its contexts within science, art, history, society, and other fields. This field is distinctive from other food-related areas of study, including nutrition, agriculture, gastronomy, and culinary arts, in that it tends to look beyond the consumption, production, and aesthetic appreciation of food. Rather, it seeks to illuminate food across multiple academic fields.

== Research questions ==
Qualitative research questions encompass a range of topics, including the environmental impact of food production, the ethical considerations of consuming certain foods, the role of food in perpetuating social systems of oppression, and its use as a medium for expressing identity. The fundamental questions include: Who chooses what we eat and why? What are the methods employed in traditional food preparation? What is the boundary between culinary heritage and invented traditions? How to teach the subject? This led to the development of the concept of "foodscape" and the practice of foodscape mapping.

Specific issues include food insecurity. Food education has health implications, especially with highly advertised fast food, and the prevalence of obesity in young people.

== See also ==
- Anthropology of food
- Culinary art
- Food choice
- Food preferences in older adults and seniors
- Food science
- Foodways
- Gastronomy
- List of food and drink magazines
- Nutrition
- Sociology of food
- Timeline of food
- Vegan studies
