= Jerusalem: A Cookbook =

2012 cookbook by Ottolenghi and Tamimi

- Author: Yotam Ottolenghi and Sami Tamimi
- Language: English
- Genre: Cookbook
- Published: 2012
- Publisher: Ebury Press
- Publication place: United Kingdom
- ISBN: 9780091943745

Jerusalem: A Cookbook is a 2012 cookbook by Jewish-Israeli Yotam Ottolenghi and Palestinian Sami Tamimi about food in Jerusalem. The book explores cuisine and traditions in the authors' shared hometown.

== Content ==
The authors, both expatriate chefs in London, present in their book an idealized vision of the Middle East and "a modification of the Israeli versus Palestinian nationalist narrative," as the authors see the food they discuss as part of "a shared regional food culture, not an antagonistic one."

== Reception ==
The book is not oriented toward an audience local to where the food discussed comes from—as of 2016 it hadn't been translated into Hebrew or Arabic—but rather it is a commentary on Jerusalem to be exported and consumed elsewhere, in London and throughout the world. The book was well received in anglophone markets. The New York Times described the impact of the book using the term "Jerusalem fever."

While Jerusalem: A Cookbook recognizes and acknowledges the existence of "a Palestinian other" by acknowledging Palestinian dishes, and demonstrates a consciousness of the political nature of the subject, in the analysis of Ilan Zvi Baron it contributes to the "foodwashing" of the political reality in the region by presenting a normative vision of the appropriation. Baron writes that this normalizing narrative treats past injustices as having little current relevance, which inhibits the possibility of engaging with the consequences of the injustices.

In 2013, in discussion with authors of The Gaza Kitchen Laila el-Haddad and Maggie Schmitt, Ottolenghi noted that if he were to rewrite the introduction of Jerusalem: A Cookbook, he would do so differently:

I would have taken the whole aspect of appropriation and ownership more seriously. I probably would have made the point that it's very hard to say who is the originator of each dish, but it's also overwhelmingly true that some of those dishes are the symbols of the Palestinian culture, and as such they just cannot become everybody's sign of culture or identity.

== See also ==
- Politics of food in the Arab–Israeli conflict
