= Reem Kassis =

Palestinian writer and cookbook author (born 1987)

- ريم قسيس
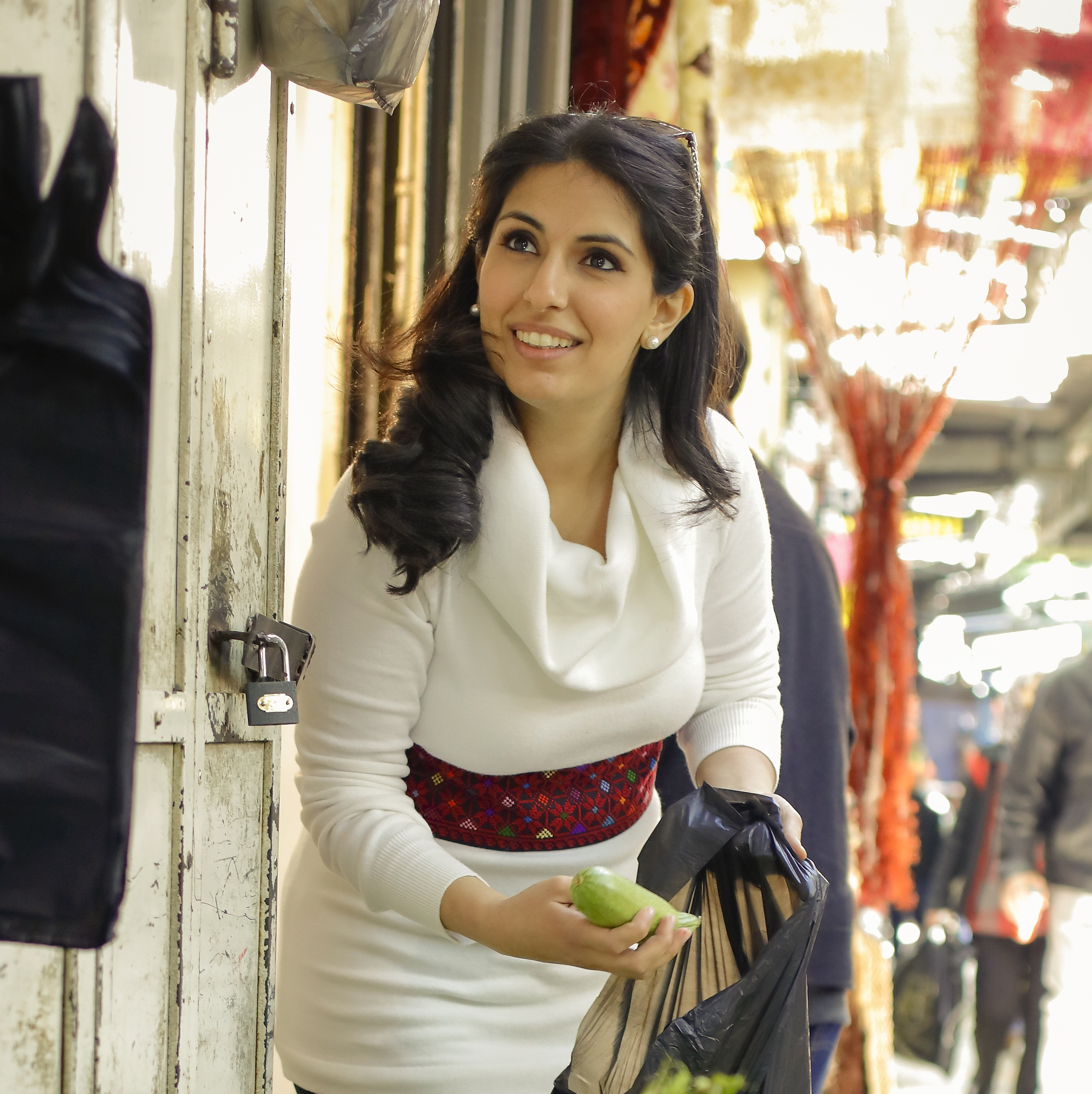
- Kassis in 2017
- Born: 1987 (age 38–39); Jerusalem
- Education: University of Pennsylvania (BA, BSc, MBA); London School of Economics (MSc)
- Occupations: Author; writer
- Years active: 2017–present
- Notable work: The Palestinian Table (2017); The Arabesque Table (2021); We Are Palestinian (2023)
- Website: reemkassis.com

Reem Kassis (Arabic: ريم قسيس; born 1987) is a Palestinian writer and author.

Her work focuses on the intersection of culture, and in particular food, with history and politics. According to The New York Times, her first book The Palestinian Table "broke open a new national conversation about both the cuisine and the appropriation of its recipes".

== Early life ==
Kassis was born in Beit Hanina, East Jerusalem, to Palestinian parents with Israeli citizenship. Her father Philip is a Christian from Galilee and her mother Nisreen is a Muslim from Jaljulya.

Her mother and grandmothers were known locally for their cooking, but Kassis had no early interest in cooking, seeing it as part of a Palestinian culture that kept women in traditional roles. She has no training as a chef.

She left Jerusalem at 17 to attend the University of Pennsylvania, where she earned her undergraduate degrees in business and international studies under the Huntsman Program. She earned her MBA from the University of Pennsylvania's Wharton School in 2010 and later studied at the London School of Economics, obtaining an MSc in social psychology.

== Career ==
=== Business ===
Prior to her career in writing, Kassis worked as a business consultant at McKinsey & Company. She also worked with the World Economic Forum and in executive search. After the birth of her daughters, she decided to leave the business world and pursue a writing career.

=== Writing ===
Kassis writes on issues of culinary appropriation, food history and culture. According to The New York Times, Kassis's first book, The Palestinian Table, "broke open a new national conversation about both the cuisine and the appropriation of its recipes". The Guardian said the book had "established Kassis as a new voice in food writing". She writes extensively for major outlets like The New York Times, The Atlantic, as well more specialized publications like Serious Eats.

==== The Palestinian Table ====
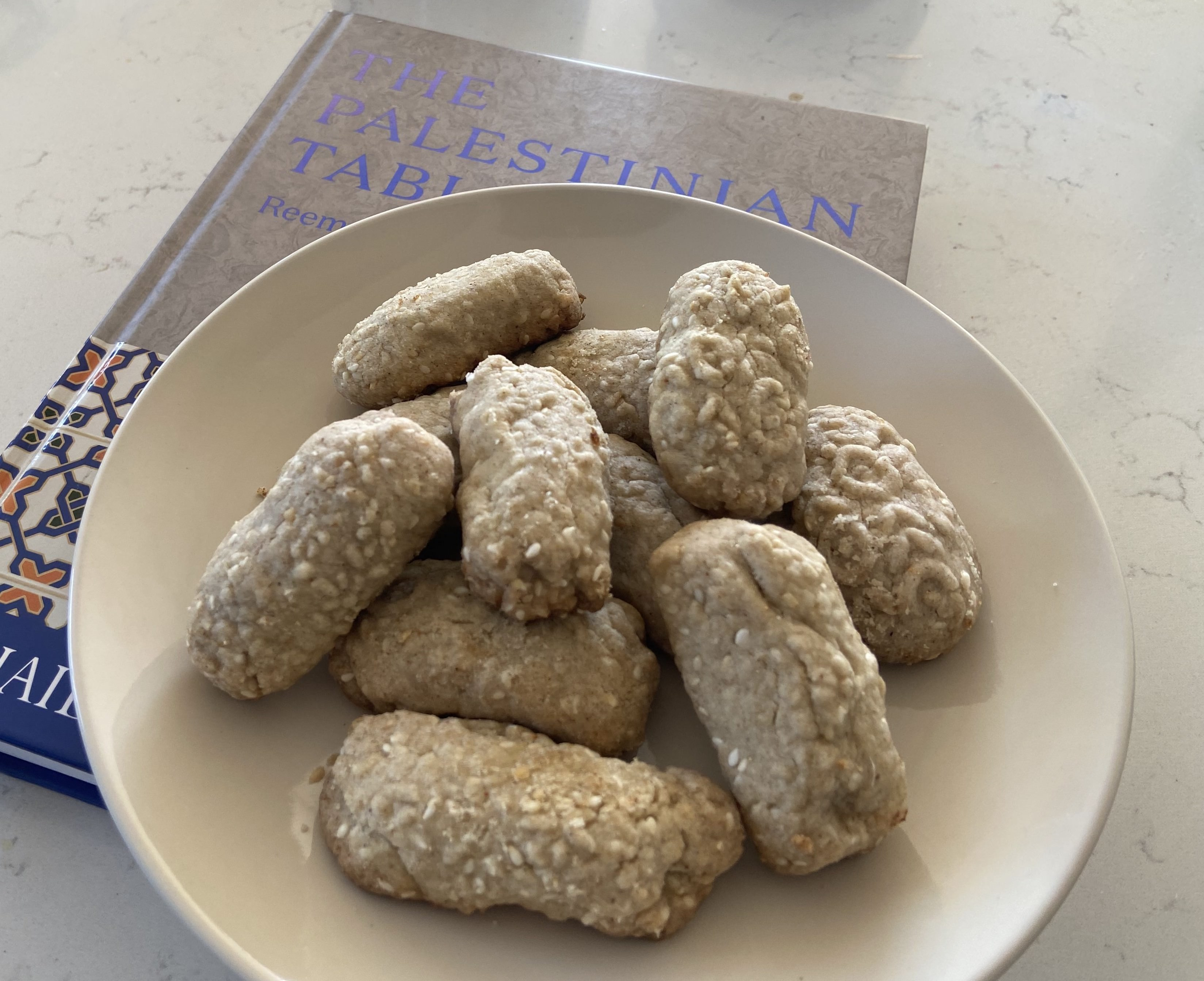
Palestinian aniseed cookies, from The Palestinian Table by Reem Kassis, the book can be seen under the plate

Her debut cookbook, The Palestinian Table, was published in October 2017 by Phaidon Press. The volume moves beyond recipes, using anecdotes and food history to explore Palestinian culture and preserve traditional Palestinian dishes. Journalist Jehan Alfarra called out Kassis' anecdotes for providing "valuable cultural insight as well as specifics about how the local dishes are prepared and served". The book contains 150 recipes. Photography was shot in Jerusalem.

Multiple outlets, including NPR, New York Magazine, The Independent, and Saveur, named the book to their best-of lists for 2017. A journalist in the Institute for Palestine Studies recommended the book for newcomers, calling Kassis “a humble guide who doesn’t dazzle with intimidating recipes”. Tanuahka Marah, the reviewer for the Morning Star, described the photography as “stunning”. Anthony Bourdain called it an "essential book".

The Palestinian Table was short-listed for the Andre Simon Food and Drink Book Awards, the Edward Stanford Travel Writing Awards, and was a winner in the Eugenie Brazier awards in Lyon. It won the First Book award by the Guild of Food Writers and was nominated for the James Beard Foundation Award in the International category.

The book has been translated into German and French.

==== The Arabesque Table ====
The Arabesque Table was published in 2021 by Phaidon Press. The volume takes a much broader look at contemporary cooking from across the Arab world, tracing the evolving and cross cultural food of the region and showcasing the impact of Arab food on global cooking today. Multiple outlets, including The New York Times, Eater, Food & Wine, and CNN, listed it as one of the best cookbooks of 2021. Yotam Ottolenghi said, "The Arabesque Table sees food, recipes and stories as part of the on-going conversation (and feast!) between cultures and their cuisines. It sees food, stories and the identities these things are linked to as fluid, receptive; not as static or fixed in one time or place."

==== We Are Palestinian ====
We Are Palestinian was published in 2023 by Interlink Books. It is an exploration for younger readers of the culture and history of Palestinian people.

== Selected works ==
=== Books ===
- The Palestinian Table (Phaidon, 2017), ISBN 978-0714874968
- The Arabesque Table (Phaidon, 2021), ISBN 978-1838662516
- We are Palestinian (Bonnier Books, 2023), ISBN 978-1800783287

=== Chapter Contribution ===
- The Best American Food and Travel Writing (Harper Collins, 2025) - They Ate at My Table then Ignored My People
- Sing the Truth: The Kweli Journal Short Story Collection (Author's Equity, 2025) - Farradiya, A Short Story
- Resilient Kitchens (James Beard Winner) (Rutgers University Press, 2022) - The Lost Year
- Making Levantine Cuisine (University of Texas Press, 2021) - Even in a Small Country like Palestine, Cuisine is Regional
- Breakfast: The Cookbook (Phaidon, 2019) - Middle Eastern Breakfast Chapter Intro

=== Selection of newspaper articles ===
- They Ate at My Table, Then Ignored My People, The Atlantic (2024)
- What Home Cooking does that Restaurants Can’t, The Atlantic (2023)
- National Cuisine is a Useful Illusion, The Atlantic (2022)
- Do You have Nafas, the Elusive Gift that Makes Food Taste Better?, The New York Times (2021)
- The Best Olive Oil in the World? This Village Thinks So, The New York Times (2021)
- For Arab Americans, It’s Not Thanksgiving Without Hashweh, The New York Times (2021)
- The Menu Evolves for a Muslim Holiday Built Around Food, The New York Times (2021)
- Here’s why Palestinians object to the term ‘Israeli food’: It erases us from history, The Washington Post (2020)
- Why we cook when the world doesn't make sense, The Los Angeles Times (2020)

== Personal life ==
Kassis is married to Albert (Aboud) Muaddi. They lived in London and then moved to Philadelphia.

During a 2022 interview with American journalist Terry Gross, Kassis described her life as a Palestinian with Israeli citizenship as being that of a "second class citizen", citing being singled out for interrogated and strip search during a work trip despite holding an Israeli passport, and the inequity of state provided services in Arab neighbourhoods. "So on paper, the rights are equal, you’re an Israeli citizen, the only difference is you don’t serve in the military. In reality, it wasn’t the case."
