= Opsophagos =

Ancient Greek glutton

Opsophagos (Ancient Greek: ὀψοφάγος) was a type of ancient Greek person who exhibited a seemingly uncontrollable desire for opson, or relishes. The vice of the opsophagos was opsophagia, for which the closest English equivalent is gourmandise. However, because fish/seafood was considered by far the most desirable opson, an opsophagos in ancient Greek literature is almost always a man obsessed with fish or seafood.

Tales of infamous opsophagoi (plural form) focussed on men who took their gourmandise to extreme levels, training their bodies in various ways to be able to consume massive quantities of fish immediately after they had been prepared, ensuring that they would have the fish to themselves, since they would be too hot for others to even touch, let alone eat. These tales of men with heat-resistant throats and padded fingertips were likely fictional, but they served as reminders to all who heard them that letting the pleasure-driven body overcome the rational soul was not the way to become an ideal human. One could enjoy fish, but one had to be careful not to take this enjoyment too far and become an opsophagos.

Eleans used the epithet Opsophagos for the god Apollo.

== More ==
- Davidson, James (1997). Courtesans and Fishcakes: The Consuming Passions of Classical Athens. Great Britain: Harper Collins. Archived from the original on 2007-02-20.
