= Sami Tamimi =

Palestinian chef and author living in London

- سامي التميمي
- Born: 1968 (age 57–58); Jerusalem
- Culinary career
- Cooking style: Middle Eastern
- Current restaurants
- Rovi (Fitzrovia); Nopi (Soho)
- Awards
- James Beard Award (2013)
- Website: www.sami-tamimi.com

Sami Tamimi (Arabic: سامي التميمي) is a Palestinian chef and author living in London. He is the co-owner of six delis and restaurants in London. Tamimi is also the co-author of several bestselling cookbooks, including Ottolenghi (2008), Jerusalem (2012) and Falastin (2020). His first solo cookbook, Boustany, was published in 2025.

== Early life ==
Tamimi grew up in a Muslim family in the Old City of East Jerusalem. Tamimi moved out of his family home at 17. He started his career as a porter at Mount Zion, a Jerusalem hotel. Tamimi quickly became a chef at Mount Zion and after a number of jobs he became head chef of Lilith in Tel Aviv. An English customer at Lilith offered Tamimi a job. He accepted and in 1997 he moved to London to run the kitchen at the bakery Baker & Spice.

== Career ==
=== Collaboration with Yotam Ottolenghi ===
In 1999 while Tamimi was running Baker & Spice, Yotam Ottolenghi visited the store. “It was completely magical,” Ottolenghi said. “I saw all these walls and counters covered with a marvelous mix of food. There were Middle Eastern salads, Italian Caprese salads, rotisserie chickens, even char-grilled broccoli.” Soon afterwards, Ottolenghi started working there. Tamimi was in charge of the savories and Ottolenghi was in charge of the pastries. The two became friends and talked about going into business together. In 2002 Tamimi became partners with Noam Bar and Yotam Ottolenghi in the deli Ottolenghi in Notting Hill. They have expanded to more locations and now this group runs the restaurants Rovi and Nopi.

Tamimi and Ottolenghi have written two critically acclaimed cookbooks, Ottolenghi and Jerusalem. The latter has won many awards, including the International Book Award from the James Beard Foundation in 2013, and it has been credited with starting many cookbook clubs.

=== Other works ===
Tamimi and Tara Wigley coauthored the cookbook Falastin, published in 2020. Tamimi's first cookbook written alone, Boustany, was published in 2025. The cookbook's name means "my garden" in Arabic, and is largely centered around vegetarian dishes and Levantine food preservation. Tamimi described the book as showing both Palestinian and non-Palestinian readers a way to understand Palestinian heritage and history, especially surrounding its cuisine and culture.

== Personal life ==
Tamimi lives with his partner Jeremy Kelly. He writes, paints and composes Arabic poetry.

== Published works ==
- Ottolenghi: The Cookbook (2008) (with Yotam Ottolenghi)
- Jerusalem: A Cookbook (2012) (with Yotam Ottolenghi)
- Falastin: A Cookbook (2020) (with Tara Wigley)
- Boustany: A Celebration of Vegetables from my Palestine [A Cookbook] (2025)

== Awards and recognition ==
- 2011 Condé Nast Traveler "Innovation and Design Awards", NOPI, winner of the Gourmet award
- 2012 Restaurant and Bar Design Awards, "Identity" category for the restaurant Nopi
- 2013 James Beard Award "International Cookbook" for Jerusalem
- 2013 Guild of Food Writers Awards, "Cookery Book Award" for Jerusalem
- 2013 Gourmand World Cookbook Awards, the Dun Gifford Award winner for Jerusalem
- 2013 International Association of Culinary Professionals Awards, winner of the International award and the Best Cookbook award for Jerusalem
- 2013 Observer Food Monthly "Best Cookbook Award" for Jerusalem
