= Anthropology of food =

Study of history behind food production and consumption

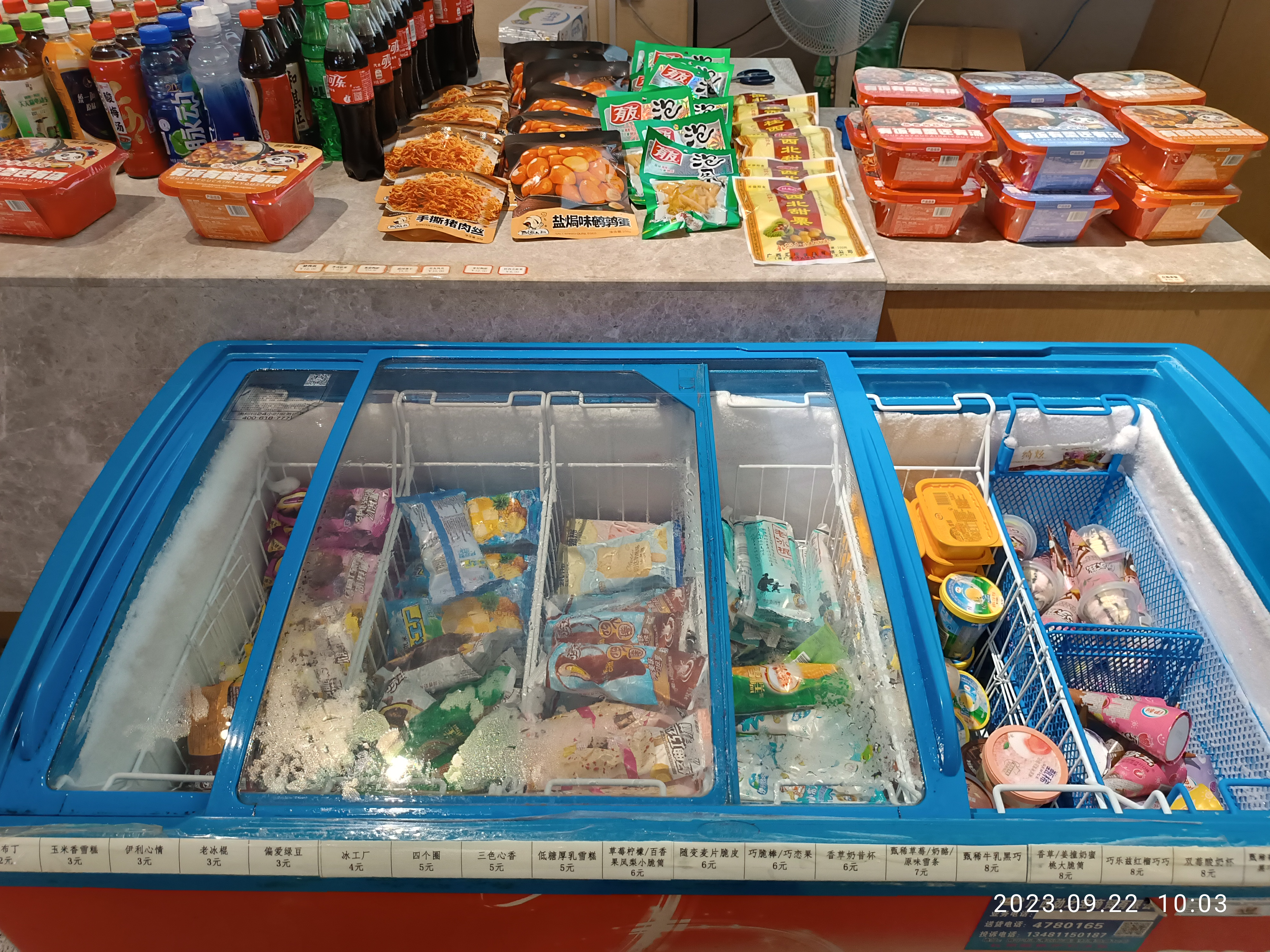

The anthropology of food is a sub-field of cultural anthropology that connects an ethnographic and historical perspective with contemporary social issues in food-production and food-consumption systems.

Although early anthropological accounts often dealt with cooking and eating as part of ritual or daily life, food rarely became the central point of academic focus. This changed in the second half of the 20th century, when foundational work by Mary Douglas, Marvin Harris, Arjun Appadurai, Jack Goody, and Sidney Mintz cemented the study of food as a key insight into modern social life. Mintz became known as the "Father of food anthropology" for his 1985 work Sweetness and Power, which linked Europe's demand for sugar with imperial expansion and with exploitative industrial-labor conditions in both Europe and America.

Research has traced the material and symbolic importance of food, as well as how they intersect. Examples of ongoing research themes include food as a form of differentiation, commensality, and food's role in industrialization and in globalizing labor and commodity chains.

Several related and interdisciplinary academic programs exist in the US and the UK (listed under Food studies institutions).

Anthropology of food is also the name of a scientific journal first published in 2001.

== History ==
In 1885, John Gregory Bourke wrote the first anthropological paper specifically on food: "The Urine Dance of the Zuni Indians of New Mexico". In the paper Bourke questioned what it meant for something to be edible. After some work on the symbolic value of food, anthropologists focused on food from a "functionalist" perspective, writing on how food served a role of nutrition, as seen in the work of Audrey Richards. Others produced ethnographic accounts of food practices and in the US, some focused on the role of psychology, in particular the role of infant feeding. After WWII, food anthropologists took an ecological perspective, to explain cultural notions of habits, taboos etc. One such major figure at this time was Marvin Harris. At the same time, thinkers who characterized food as the product of shared thinking, including Mary Douglas and structuralist Claude Lévi-Strauss were influential.

Disputes between thinkers continued in the 1980s, when the publications of Sidney Mintz's Sweetness and Power, Jack Goody's Cooking, Cuisine and Class and Mary Weismantel's Food, Gender, and Poverty in the Ecuadorian Andes shifted the field to taking a less rigid approach to symbolism, and being more focused on history and economics. Identity became a popular axis of investigation, until at the beginning of the 21st century it was criticised by some scholars as staid and as being theorized in an unsophisticated manner. Following thinkers researched how food could be understood as maintaining a historical identity among eaters, and how this can change with shifts brought about by economic development.

== See also ==
- Nutritional anthropology
- Sociology of food
- Foodways
- Food studies
- The Cooking Gene
- Gastronomica
