= Opson and sitos =

Ancient Greek food categorisation

Opson (Greek: ὄψον) and sitos (σίτος) are an important division in Ancient Greek foodways. Opson is the 'relish' that complements the sitos; sitos is the staple food part of the meal, i.e. grains like wheat or barley, and pulses like chickpeas and fava beans.

Although any kind of complement to the staple, even salt, could be categorized as opson, the term was also commonly used to refer to the most esteemed kind of relish: fish. Hence a diminutive of opson, opsarion (ὀψάριον), provides the modern Greek word for fish: psari (ψάρι). Opson can also be used to mean 'prepared dish' (plural opsa).

== Morality ==
Because it was considered the more pleasurable part of any meal, opson was the subject of some anxiety among ancient Greek moralists, who coined the term opsophagia to describe the vice of those who took too much opson with their sitos. The central focus of Greek personal morality on sophrosyne (approximately, moderation and temperate self-control) made opsophagia a matter of concern for moralists and satirists in the classical period.

The term opsophagos, literally 'opson-eater', is used by classical authors to refer to people who, almost always, are fanatical about seafood, e.g. Philoxenus of Leucas.

== Etymology ==
The complicated semantics of the word opson and its derivatives made the word a matter of concern for Atticists during the Second Sophistic. Plato, probably mistakenly, derived the word opson from the verb ἕψω ― 'to boil'.

The words have made their way into English as loan-words, as have derivatives like "opsophagos". The term parásītos (πᾰράσῑτος) is also the root of the English word parasite.

== Similar concepts in other cultures ==
Opson is somewhat equivalent to banchan in Korean cuisine and okazu in Japanese cuisine. The opson/sitos division also resembles the cài (菜)/fàn (飯) division in Mandarin Chinese, literally vegetables/cooked grain.
