= Global Food Security Act of 2009 =

The Global Food Security Act of 2009, also known as the Lugar-Casey Food Security Bill, is a bill introduced February 5, 2009 in the 111th Congress by Richard Lugar (Indiana-R) and sponsored by Robert Casey (Pennsylvania-D), Mark Begich (Alaska-D), Roland Burris (Illinois-D), Susan Collins (Maine-R), Richard Durbin (Illinois-D), Thomas Harkin (Iowa-D), John Kerry (Massachusetts-D), and Mary Landrieu (Louisiana-D) to the United States Senate as S. 384.

Were this bill to become law, it would have authorized appropriations for fiscal years 2010 through 2014 to provide assistance to foreign countries to promote food security, to stimulate rural economies, and to improve emergency response to food crises, and for other purposes, including to amend the Foreign Assistance Act of 1961. Title II in the Global Food Security Act would amend the FAA's Section 103A as following: "Agricultural research carried out under this Act shall […] (4) include research on biotechnological advances appropriate to local ecological conditions, including genetically modified technology." This amendment has opened the bill to criticism that it would be mandating research on genetically modified technology.

This bill has been endorsed by a large number of humanitarian organizations, including Oxfam, Bread for the World, The Borgen Project and the ONE Campaign.

== See also ==
- Poverty
- International Aid
- International Development
- Millennium Development Goals
