= Sociology of food =

Study of food as it relates to society

The sociology of food is the study of food and its relation to society's history, development, and future. This study includes the production and consumption of food, as well as its medical, ethical, and spiritual uses.

Food distribution in societies can be examined by analyzing changes in the food supply chain. Globalization, in particular, significantly affects the food supply chain by enabling economies of scale in the food distribution industry.

== Food distribution ==
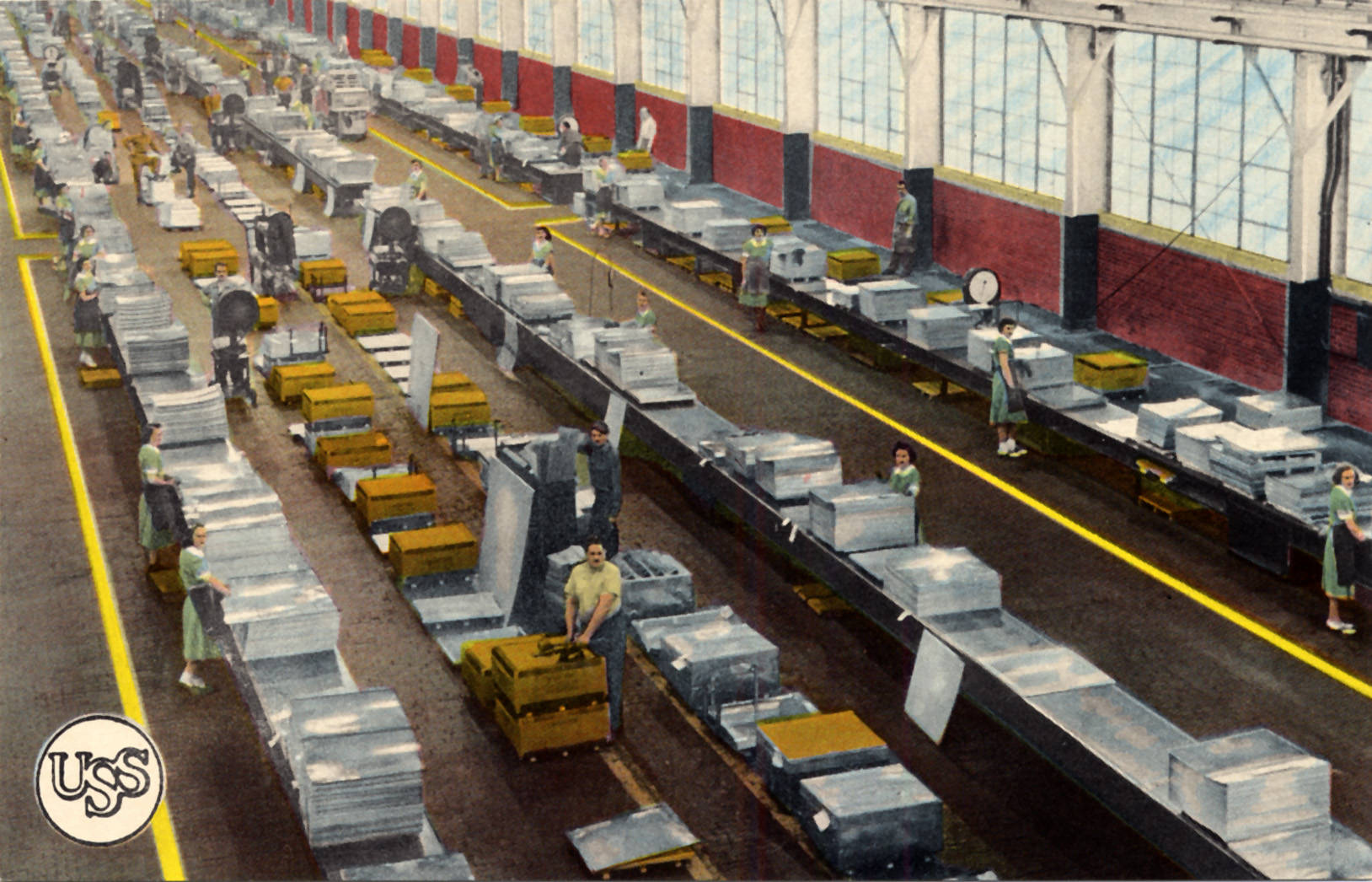
The food and beverage industry in Gary, Indiana, US (1951)

=== Impact of scale effects ===
Economies of scale (or scale effects)—resulting from centralized acquisition/purchase centers in the food supply chain—favor large retailers or distributors in the food distribution market. This situation arises because larger players can use their stronger market power and financial advantages over smaller players. With both stronger market power and greater access to the financial credit market, larger players can impose barriers to entry and cement their position in the market. This advantage results in a food distribution chain with specific characteristics: large players at one end, and small players (choosing niche markets) at the other end. The existence of smaller players in specialized food distribution markets can be attributed to their shrinking market share, as well as their inability to compete with the larger players because of scale effects. Through this process, globalization has displaced smaller players. Another factor affecting specialized food distribution markets is the ability of distribution chains to own their own brands. Stores having their own brands are able to engage in price wars by lowering prices for their own brand, thereby making consumers more likely to purchase their goods.

== History and culture ==
=== Early history ===
In the early stages of humanity, food served the sole purpose of nourishment and survival. Food was a source of energy obtained by hunting and gathering, a labor-intensive process, which required early humans to eat a calorie-rich diet. These developments eventually lead to agriculture—the cultivation of plants and animals—which also contributes to labor for food and economic aspects of the sociology of food.

=== Culture ===
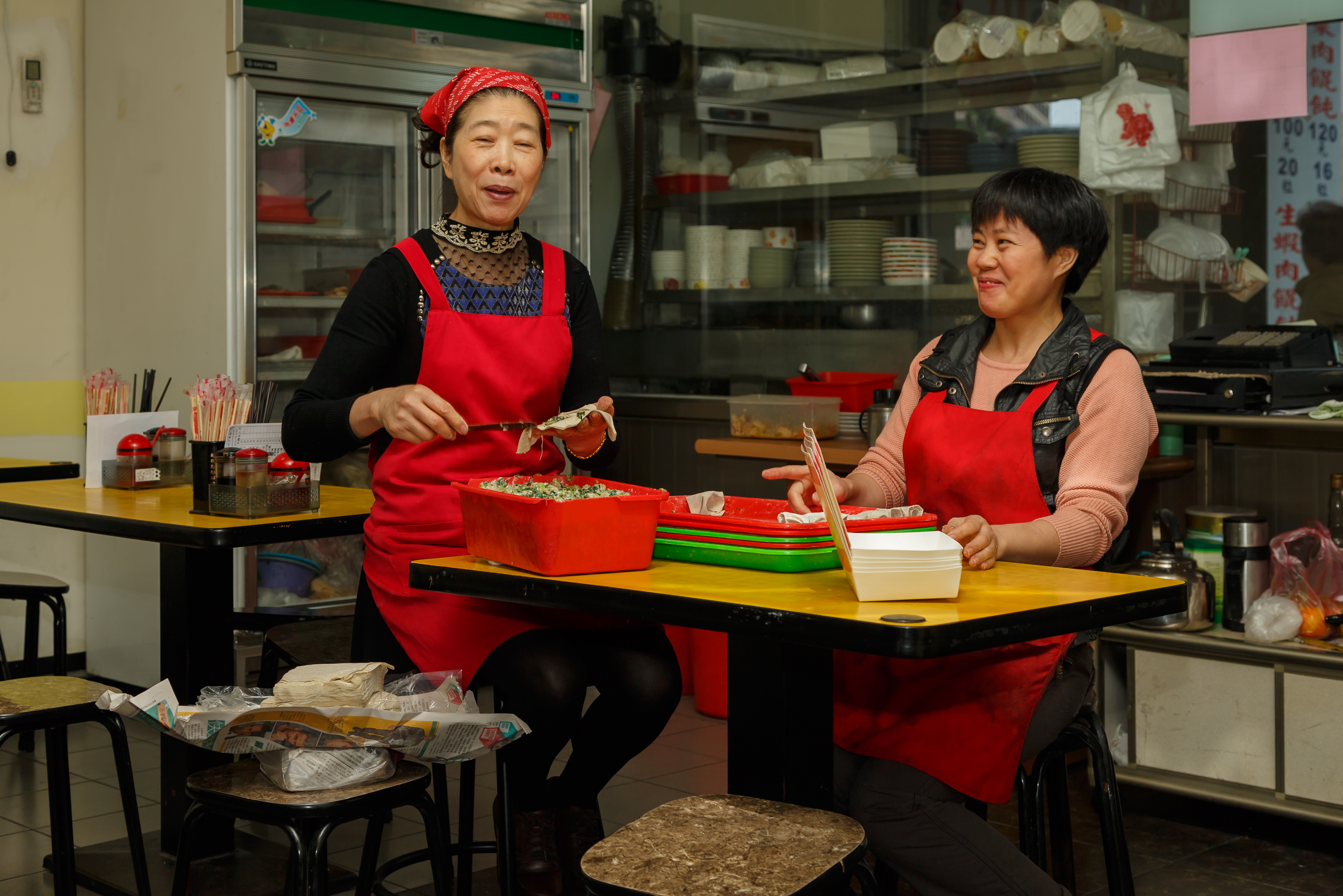
The Jiaotse Restaurant in Taipei, Taiwan. The owner is preparing handmade dumplings.

Over time, food became more of a way to bring people and cultures together. In many cultures, food is a primary motivation for people to socialize. This process has continued over millennia, with some examples as follows:

1. Early Homo sapiens hunting and gathering
2. The New World colonists sharing a feast with Native Americans, which has been revived in the tradition called Thanksgiving
3. The popularization of eating at restaurants during the last several decades, and the community feeling that accompanies eating

The preceding developments demonstrate the communication and connectivity related to food.

According to sociologists, food can be categorized by purpose and meaning:

- Cultural superfoods—the staples for a culture
- Prestige foods—reflecting economic status
- Body image food—mainly consumed to improve the body
- Sympathetic foods—eaten for a praised and desirable property, in the style of a superstition
- Physiological foods—consumed for a specific health reason, such as during pregnancy

These categories help researchers (e.g., sociologists) to study culture from a food perspective. The categorization often shows how food grows, is formed, and evolves with society. For example, if a person believes in homeopathy, their belief could be understood relative to sympathetic or physiological foods. As additional examples, caviar and oysters could be categorized as prestige foods: they are typically more expensive than other foods, and people who purchase and eat them do so to demonstrate their socioeconomic status.

== Social sciences ==
=== Sociological perspectives ===
From the perspective of symbolic interactionism (a sociological theory), many symbols are related to the sociology of food. Food, in many cultures, brings people together and connects them on multiple levels. One example is the tradition of eating with family around a table. This tradition represents community and communication. Food can also symbolize something larger than itself. In the US, fast food could represent a busy family that requires a quick dinner. To other people, however, fast food might demonstrate the McDonaldization theory, which focuses on the idea of American consumption. Another example of the sociology of food as symbolism would be preparing food from scratch. This example is definitely associated with the family. Among other theories of sociology, conflict theories also pertain to the sociology of food. As mentioned above, food was initially and primarily used for nourishment and survival. For this reason, conflict theory may apply. As hunters and gatherers, early humans needed to fight and forage for survival. Such conflict could also demonstrate "the survival of the fittest" (i.e., the process of natural selection): because of conflicts in obtaining food, the only survivors were the people who prevailed, thereby providing nourishment for themselves and their families. This situation evolved into contemporary society, where people must take jobs to earn a living, which is spent on food.

=== Psychology and disorders ===
Eating disorders symbolize the sociology of food. These disorders show how much or little self-control a person can have over something essential for survival. Eating disorders are not limited to anorexia—they also include bulimia and binge eating disorder. People with such disorders often use food as a reward. In other cases, these people see food as something to avoid, even though it is required for survival.

The human relationship with food continually varies and is a complex topic. From a sociological standpoint, modern media have a significant impact. Not only do media relate to the sociology of food, but also to the representation of society as a whole. Men and especially women view targeted and inaccurate representations of "the perfect body", leading people to want a body more like the supposed norm. In disorders such as anorexia and bulimia, patients intensely fear gaining weight and consuming calories. These disorders also represent people's damaged relationship with their food and weight, and how this relationship is generally portrayed negatively in popular media. Inaccurate representation leads people to focus excessively on appearance, rather than considering their definite need for nourishment. The inaccurate public image of a perfect body, and how such a body is affected by normal calorie consumption, has led to anorexia being the mental health disorder with the highest mortality rate. Many people in contemporary society have body dysmorphic disorder. This disorder is a mental health condition where a person spends significant time worrying about flaws in their appearance. Body image has become a related problem, since social media can show unrealistic standards relative to eating problems or disorders; this is related to the sociology of food consumption.

== Health ==
=== Dieting ===
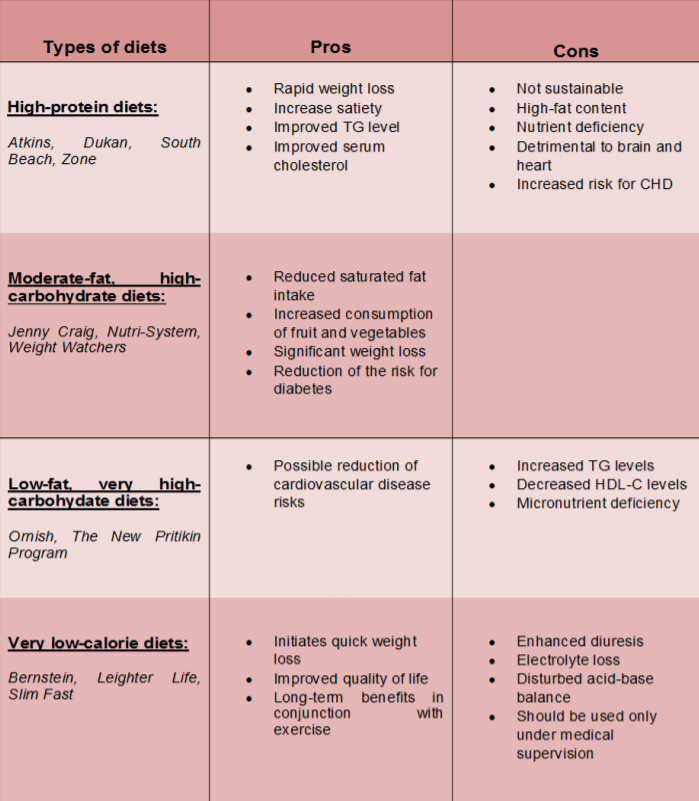
Fad diets: short-term benefits vs. long-term costs

Fad diets have existed for centuries, but the obsession with being thin only really started trending in the mainstream media during the 1990s, for example, through trends such as heroin chic. Historically, if a woman was plump, this showed that she was being taken care of. Her appearance demonstrated her wealth—she could afford to eat, unlike a peasant who lacked access to readily available meals. An ideal woman was not excessively thin. A notable change began during the 1920s, when a boyish figure became the most desirable for a woman. During the 1960s, models such as Twiggy made headlines over their thinness, and many women strove to match her body type. This trend persisted into the 1980s, when dieting—such as through the South Beach Diet or the Weight Watchers company—increased in popularity, along with the popularization of exercise and related videos. This marked the start of mainstream dieting fads. Among these diets, others increased in popularity: examples include the Atkins diet, the Jenny Craig diet, and the paleo diet. As of the early to mid-2010s, other diets became mainstream. These diets included vegetarianism, dairy-free, vegan, raw, and gluten-free. There are many reasons to choose a certain diet: morality, digestive issues, or external influences (including religious).

Related topics include changes in and comparisons among diets and communities, as well as the effect of globalization on food production and supply. An important factor is political states, including the effects of globalization and evolving cultural responses to food. These include cooking and eating practices; the management of consumer anxieties; and concerns about obesity and the medicalization of food. Changing food practices have shaped and are shaped by wider social trends.

=== Obesity ===
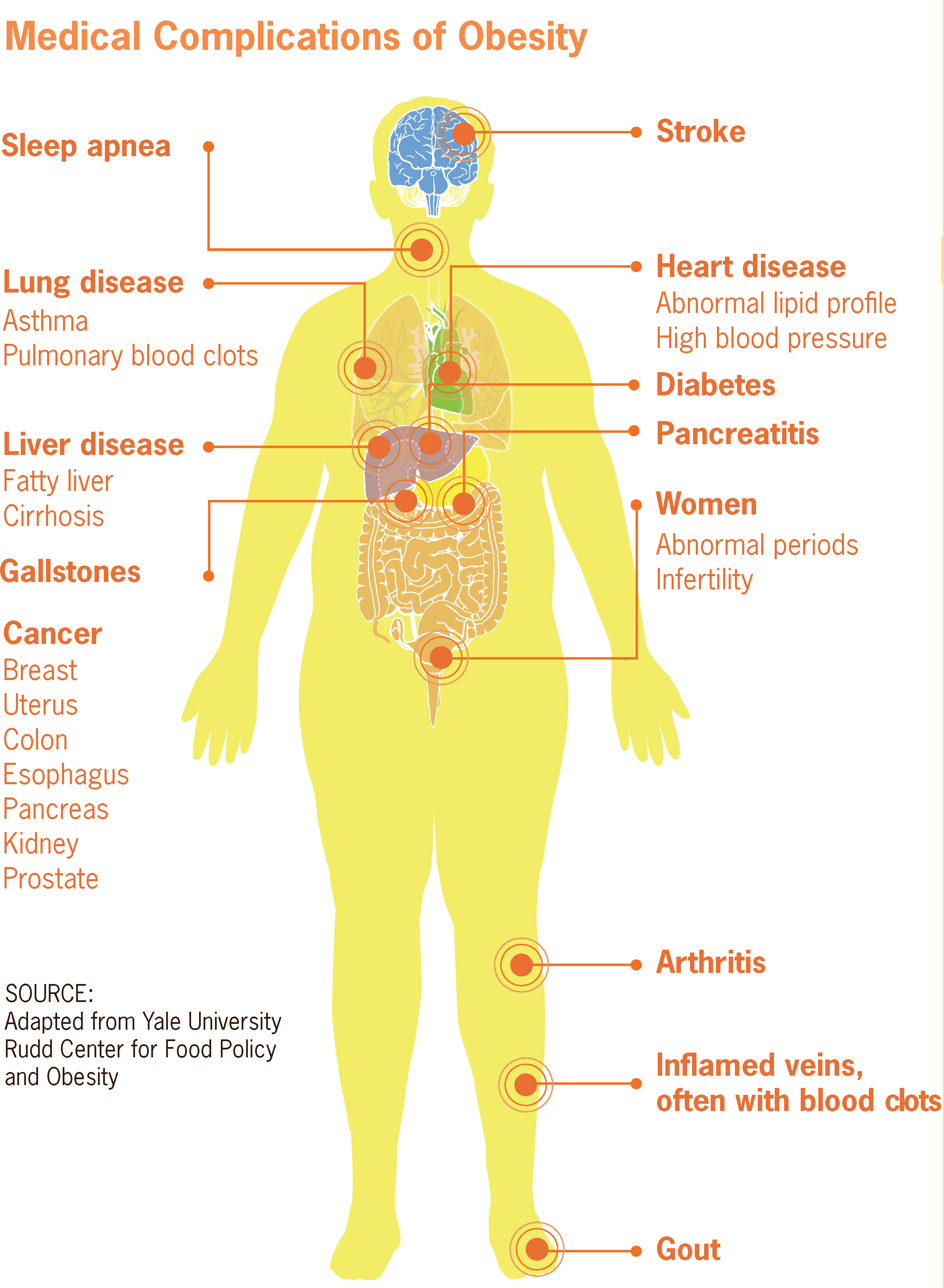
Medical complications of obesity

The evolution of the American diet, along with the resulting rise in obesity, provides a clear example of how food shapes society and daily life. Because of the fast-paced lives led by many Americans, fast food and prepackaged foods with higher caloric density have grown in popularity. A person's socioeconomic status affects the environment in which they live, which also significantly impacts the type of food that they consume,—since high-calorie and low-nutrition food tends to be cheaper and easier to locate. Lack of physical fitness is a crucial contributing factor to the obesity epidemic. Studies have found that a neighborhood's walkability and access to recreational activities are correlated with increased exercise and decreased risk of obesity. Progress has been made in combating the US's obesity problem, with programs being established to help promote healthy eating and fitness.

== See also ==
- Anthropology of food
- Cuisine
- Food and drink prohibitions
- Food studies
- Food industry
- Index of sociology of food articles
