= Foodways =

Food-related concept in social science

In social science, foodways are the cultural, social, and economic practices relating to the production and consumption of food. Foodways often refers to the intersection of food in culture, traditions, and history.

== Etymology and historical overview ==
The Merriam-Webster Dictionary defines foodways as "the eating habits and culinary practices of a people, region, or historical period".

The term ′foodways′ appears to have been coined in 1942 by three University of Chicago graduate students, John W. Bennett, Harvey L. Smith and Herbert Passin. In the 1920s and 1930s, agricultural scientists and rural sociologists, usually under the auspices of the United States Department of Agriculture, had undertaken various studies of food habits of the rural poor, with the aim of improving them. With the advent of World War II, these efforts increased. Those with information to share about different food habits were encouraged to contact the cultural anthropologist Margaret Mead at the National Research Council.

It was in these circumstances that John W. Bennett and his companions went to study Anglo-Americans, German-Americans and African-Americans in the fertile but frequently flooded bottomlands of southern Illinois along the banks of the Mississippi River. All depended on white bread, pork, and potatoes. To the investigators these habits, particularly the spurning of plentiful, nutritious foods such as fish, seemed irrational. They argued "The illusion of an 'economic man,' searching out the most obscure foodstuffs from an unwilling Nature in the reasoned pursuit of complete fulfillment of his needs, must give way to the concept of a man conditioned by the preferences and prejudices of his neighbors, selecting only those foods sanctioned by the 'culture.'" Presumably they chose the term foodways by analogy with the term folkways. This had gained currency in the United States following its adoption by Yale professor and pioneering social scientist William Graham Sumner. Since folkways were established by use, not reason, they were resistant to change and not easily altered by government intervention. Similarly, Bennett et al. concluded, foodways were not likely to change simply because bureaucrats suggested that new ways had economic or nutritional benefits.

The term foodways was little used until the late 1960s and early 1970s and the surge in folklife research, including the establishment of the Smithsonian Folklife Festival in 1967. As the field of foodways develops, scholars offer their own definitions:

Contemporary scholarship defines foodways as the study of what we eat, as well as how and why and under what circumstances we eat it. As folklorist Jay Anderson argued in a pioneering 1971 essay, foodways encompasses "the whole interrelated system of food conceptualization and evaluation, procurement, preservation, preparation, consumption and nutrition shared by all the members of a particular society. This broad definition embraces both historical and regional differences while simultaneously pointing to the importance of food events (barbecues, Brunswick stew suppers, oyster roasts), food processes (ham curing, snap-bean canning, fried apple pie making), and even the aesthetic realms that touch upon the world of food (country songs about food, quilts raffled at community fish fries, literary references to eating)."

— John T. Edge

== Social science ==
Anthropologists, folklorists, sociologists, historians, and food scholars often use the term foodways to describe the study of why we eat what we eat and what it means. The term, therefore, looks at food consumption on a deeper than concrete level and includes, yet goes beyond, sustenance, recipes, and/or taste. According to Harris, Lyon and McLaughlin: "…everything about eating including what we consume, how we acquire it, who prepares it and who's at the table – is a form of communication rich with meaning. Our attitudes, practices and rituals around food are a window onto our most basic beliefs about the world and ourselves." As one research team puts it,

We all eat, and associate different layers of cultural meaning to the food we consume. Explorations of food, then, can be an easy conduit into the complex world of intangible cultural heritage.

Topics like social inclusion and exclusion, power, and sense making are explored under the umbrella term foodways. This is especially evident in political messaging that uses terms like "latte liberal" or "Joe Six Pack" to convey notions of class and community. Such framing is based on perceived consumption patterns and preferences of politicians and their constituents. This food/power dynamic is even present within the former Trump administration's position toward fast food, particularly when Trump offered hamburgers to guests in an implicit appeal to what the White House considered "quintessentially American" cuisine. Furthermore, the ways in which food shapes and is shaped by social organization are essential to examination of foodways. Since consumption of food is socially constructed, cultural study is also incorporated in the term.

Anthropologist Mary Douglas, explains: "A very modest life of subsistence contrasts with our own use of goods, in for example, the use of food. How would we be able to say all of the things we want to say, even just to the members of our families, about different kinds of events and occasions and possibilities if we did not make any difference between breakfast and lunch and dinner and if we made no difference between Sunday and weekdays, and never had a different kind of meal when friends came in, and if Christmas Day had also to be celebrated with the same kind of food?"

While in fields like anthropology, the production, procurement, preparation, presentation, and consumption of foods have always been regarded as central in the study of cultures the use of the term foodways in popular culture is used as an oriented way of looking at food practices. In this sense, the term is a consumer culture expression that encompasses, in popularly understandable and debatable formats, contemporaneous social practices related to foods as well as nutritional and culinary aspects of foods.

== Regional aspects ==
The term foodways can be employed when referencing the "ways of food" of a region or location. For example:

- The Foodways Section of the American Folklore Society and the Department of Popular Culture at Bowling Green State University release an annual publication called Digest: An Interdisciplinary Study of Food and Foodways. In addition to scholarly articles, this annual compendium offers reports of works in progress on foodways. These include photo essays, course syllabi, and announcements. Also found here are reviews of books, periodicals, conferences, exhibits, festivals, museums, and films.
- The website Michigan Foodways is devoted to "exhibitions and public programs focused on Michigan's unique contributions to the national culinary tapestry".
- The Mystic Seaport Museum in Connecticut published the book Saltwater Foodways, focusing on the foods of New Englanders. It examines the population's behavior as seafaring people and when ashore.
- Colonial Williamsburg has a foodways staff dedicated to studying and recreating the foodways and practices of historical Williamsburg's upper class. "The foodways team prepares dishes served to the colony's upper class because so much historical information about their culinary life is available, said Frank Clark, foodways supervisor and Colonial Williamsburg's first journeyman cook. Historians know far less about food practices of people further down the social scale, but cookbooks, documents, kitchen inventories, and archaeological research provide a detailed picture about how the governor and the gentry dined."
- The Southern Foodways Alliance explores the foodways of the American South via oral history projects, films, sharing of recipes, and promoting the teaching of foods and cultures of the region. Their website also links to that of the University of Mississippi.

Immigrant foodways are also featured prominently in America. For example, the University of Massachusetts Dartmouth, located in Southeastern Massachusetts - which has a very large immigrant population from Cape Verde - describes Cape Verdean foodways by publishing recipes from these southern Atlantic islands.

== Scholarly approaches ==
In contrast to the anthropological treatments of food, the term foodways aims at a highly cross-disciplinary approach to food and nutrition. For example, the refereed journal Food and Foodways, published by Taylor & Francis, is "devoted to publishing original scholarly articles on the history and culture of human nourishment. By reflecting on the role food plays in human relations, this unique journal explores the powerful but often subtle ways in which food has shaped, and shapes, our lives socially, economically, politically, mentally, nutritionally, and morally. Because food is a pervasive social phenomenon, it cannot be approached by any one discipline".

In consumer culture research, contemporary and postmodern foodways are topics of interest. In an article in the journal Consumption Markets & Culture, from Taylor & Francis publications, Douglas Brownlie, Paul Hewer, and Suzanne Horne explore culinary consumptionscapes through a study of contemporary cookbooks, with chic recipes often turning intensely into a kind of "gastroporn", creating a "simulacrum of desire" as well as a "simulacrum of satisfaction."

Historical studies of foodways help scientists, anthropologists, and scholars gain insight into past cultures.

Springer Publishing has released the book, Pre-Columbian Foodways, by John Staller and Michael Carrasco, which studies and examines "the symbolic complexity of food and its preparation, as well as the social importance of feasting in contemporary and historical societies." Books like this help further the study of foodways and increase public awareness.

== See also ==
- Anthropology of food
- Ethnography
- Food studies
