= Yotam Ottolenghi =

Israel-British chef, cookery writer

Yotam Ottolenghi יותם אוטולנגי
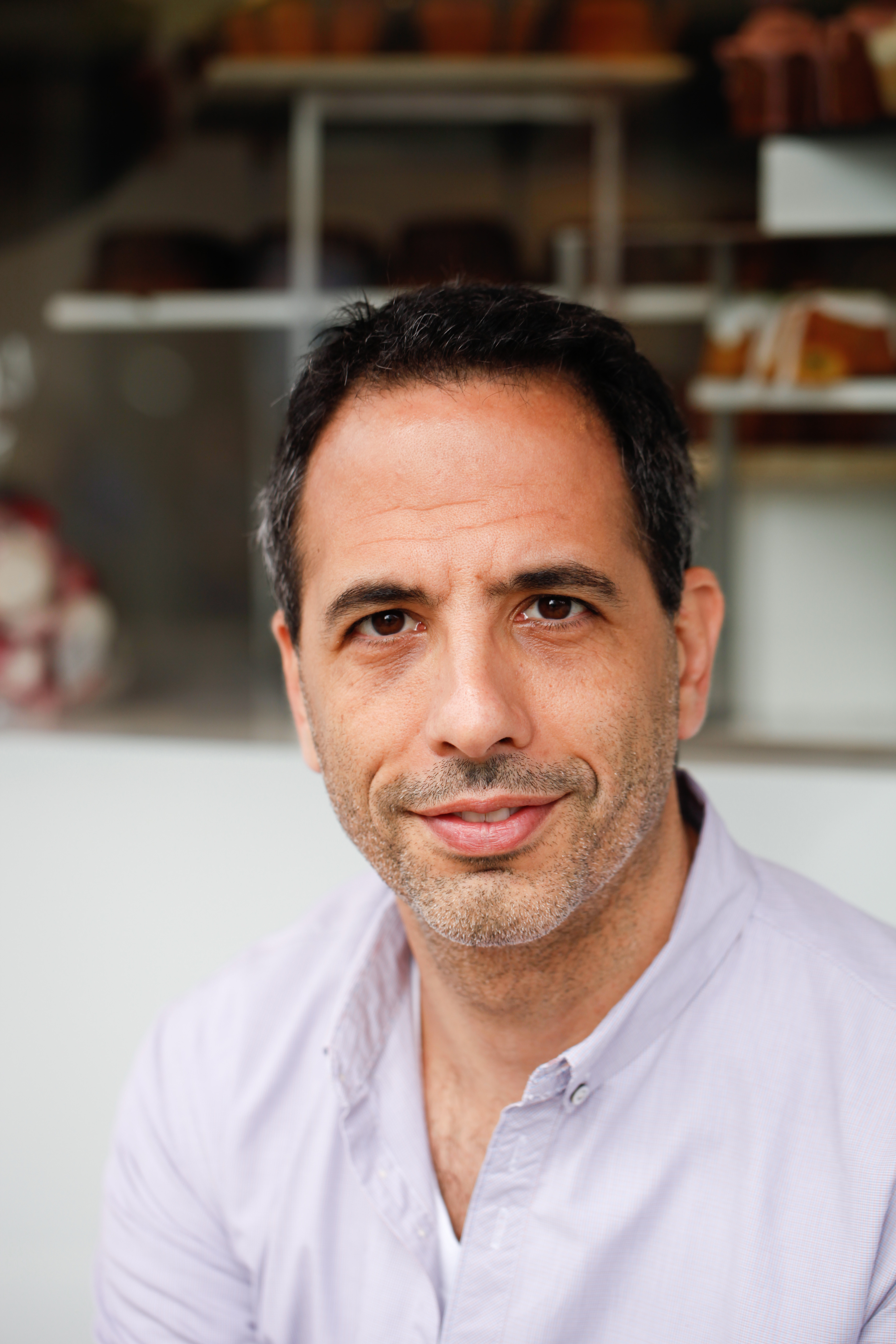
- Born: Yotam Assaf Ottolenghi; 14 December 1968 (age 57); Jerusalem, Israel
- Education: Tel Aviv University; Le Cordon Bleu
- Spouse: Karl Allen (m. 2012)
- Children: 2
- Culinary career
- Cooking style: Middle Eastern
- Current restaurants
- NOPI (London); ROVI (London)
- Award
- James Beard Award (2013, 2016)
- Writing career
- Notable works: Plenty; Jerusalem
- Website: www.ottolenghi.co.uk

Yotam Assaf Ottolenghi (Hebrew: יותם אוטולנגי; born 14 December 1968) is an Israeli-British chef, restaurateur, and food writer. Alongside Sami Tamimi, he is the co-owner of nine delis and restaurants in London and Bicester Village and the author of several bestselling cookbooks, including Ottolenghi: The Cookbook (2008), Plenty (2010), Jerusalem (2012) and Simple (2018).

== Biography ==
Yotam Ottolenghi was born to Jewish parents in Jerusalem and raised in its Ramat Denya suburb, the son of Michael Ottolenghi, a chemistry professor at Hebrew University and Ruth Ottolenghi, a high school principal. He is of Italian Jewish and German Jewish descent and often spent his childhood summers in Italy. He has an older sister, Tirza Florentin. His younger brother, Yiftach, was killed by friendly fire in 1992 during his military service. Ottolenghi is an Italian name, an Italianised form of Ettlingen, a town in Baden-Württemberg from which Jews were expelled in the 15th and 16th centuries; many settled in Northern Italy.

Ottolenghi was conscripted into the Israel Defence Forces in 1989, serving three years in IDF intelligence headquarters. He then studied at the Adi Lautman Interdisciplinary Programme for Outstanding Students of Tel Aviv University where in 1997, he completed a combined bachelor's and master's degree in comparative literature; his thesis was on the philosophy of the photographic image. While working on his thesis, Ottolenghi served as a night copy editor for Haaretz. In 1997, Ottolenghi and his then partner Noam Bar moved to Amsterdam, where he edited the Hebrew section of the Dutch-Jewish weekly NIW. He later relocated to London to study French pastry cooking at Le Cordon Bleu.

Ottolenghi met Karl Allen in 2000, they married in 2012 and had two sons, born in 2013 and 2015. In 2013, Ottolenghi "came out as a gay father" in a Guardian essay that detailed the lengthy process of conceiving their first son via gestational surrogacy, an option that he believes should be more widely available to those who cannot conceive naturally. Ottolenghi and Allen have since separated in 2025 and are now divorced.

== Culinary career ==
=== Catering ===
Ottolenghi served as a pastry chef at three London restaurants: the Michelin-starred Capital Restaurant, Kensington Place, and Launceston Place in Kensington New Town. In 1999, he became head pastry chef at the artisanal pastry shop Baker and Spice, where he met the Palestinian chef Sami Tamimi, who grew up in Jerusalem's Old City. Ottolenghi and Tamimi bonded over a joint "incomprehension of traditional English food".

In 2002, the duo (in collaboration with Noam Bar) founded the eponymous delicatessen Ottolenghi in the Notting Hill district of London. The deli quickly gained a cult following due to its inventive dishes, characterised by the foregrounding of vegetables, unorthodox flavour combinations, and the abundance of Middle Eastern ingredients such as rose water, za'atar, and pomegranate molasses. When asked to explain his cooking philosophy Ottolenghi said "I want drama in the mouth." The Ottolenghi brand has since expanded to three more delis (in Islington, Marylebone and Chelsea), a formal restaurant in Spitalfields, a brasserie named NOPI in Soho, and a vegetable-centric restaurant named ROVI which opened in Fitzrovia in June 2018. The London restaurants have received coverage from major UK food critics and have been featured in restaurant and dining guides published by outlets such as The Guardian, Financial Times, and Time Out London.

=== Writing ===
In 2006, Ottolenghi began writing a weekly column for The Guardian titled "The New Vegetarian," though he himself is not a vegetarian and has sometimes noted where a vegetable-centric recipe would pair well with a particular cut of meat. Influenced by the straightforward, culturally-grounded food writing of Nigella Lawson and Claudia Roden, Ottolenghi's recipes rarely fit within traditional dietary or cultural categories. He explained that his mission is "celebrating vegetables or pulses without making them taste like meat, or as complements to meat, but to be what they are. It does no favour to vegetarians, making vegetables second best."

His debut cookery book Ottolenghi: The Cookbook was published in 2008. Eight volumes have followed: the all-vegetable cookery books Plenty (2010), Plenty More (2014) and Ottolenghi Flavour (2020); Jerusalem (2012); NOPI (2015); the dessert cookery book Sweet (2017); Ottolenghi Simple (2018); and most recently a series of Ottolenghi Test Kitchen (OTK) books: OTK: Shelf Love (2021) and OTK: Extra Good Things (2022). Ottolenghi's bestselling cookery books have proven influential, with The New York Times noting that they are "widely knocked-off for their plain-spoken instructions, puffy covers, and photographs [that Ottolenghi] oversees himself, eschewing a food stylist". In 2014, the London Evening Standard remarked that Ottolenghi had "radically rewritten the way Londoners cook and eat", and Bon Appétit wrote that he had "made the world love vegetables".

=== Broadcasting ===
Ottolenghi has hosted three television specials: Jerusalem on a Plate (BBC4, 2011); Ottolenghi's Mediterranean Feast (More4, 2012); and Ottolenghi's Mediterranean Island Feast (More4, 2013). He served as a guest judge on the ninth (2017), eleventh (2019) and thirteenth (2021) seasons of the cooking game show Masterchef Australia. He had declined numerous guest-judge offers in the past and agreed to appear on Masterchef Australia "because it's quite humane and positive. It's about the personal development of the contestants more than the competition."

== Restaurants ==
- NOPI (Soho): A brasserie offering all-day dining with bold flavors.
- ROVI (Fitzrovia): A larger venue focusing on vegetables, fermentation, and cooking over fire.
- Ottolenghi Delis/Restaurants: These locations function as both restaurants and high-end, take-away shops featuring signature salad displays and pastries.

== Published works ==
- Ottolenghi: The Cookbook (2008) (with Sami Tamimi)
- Plenty (2010)
- Jerusalem: A Cookbook (2012) (with Sami Tamimi)
- Plenty More (2014)
- NOPI (2015) (with Ramael Scully & Tara Wigley)
- Sweet: Desserts from London's Ottolenghi (2017) (with Helen Goh & Tara Wigley)
- Ottolenghi Simple (2018) (with Tara Wigley & Esme Howarth)
- Ottolenghi Flavour (2020) (with Ixta Belfrage & Tara Wigley)
- Ottolenghi Test Kitchen: Shelf Love (2021) (with Noor Murad)
- Ottolenghi Test Kitchen: Extra Good Things (2022) (with Noor Murad)
- Ottolenghi Comfort (2024) (with Helen Goh, Verena Lochmuller & Tara Wigley)

== Awards and recognition ==
- 2010 Galaxy National Book Awards "Food and Drink Book of the Year" for Plenty
- 2010 Observer Food Monthly's "Best Cookbooks Ever", Plenty ranked number 40
- 2011 Condé Nast Traveler "Innovation and Design Awards", NOPI, winner of the Gourmet award
- 2011 Observer Food Monthly's "Best Cookbook Award" winner for Plenty
- 2012 Restaurant and Bar Design Awards, "Identity" category for the restaurant Nopi
- 2012 Guild of Food Writers Awards, "Kate Whiteman Award for Work on Food and Travel" for Jerusalem on a Plate (BBC4)
- 2013 James Beard Award "International Cookbook" for Jerusalem
- 2013 Guild of Food Writers Awards, "Cookery Book Award" for Jerusalem
- 2013 Guild of Food Writers Awards, "Evelyn Rose Award for Cookery Journalist" for journalism in The Guardian
- 2013 Gourmand World Cookbook Awards, the Dun Gifford Award winner for Jerusalem
- 2013 International Association of Culinary Professionals Awards, winner of the International award and the Best Cookbook award for Jerusalem
- 2013 Fortnum and Mason Food and Drink Awards, "Television Programme of the Year" for Ottolenghi's Mediterranean Feast (Keo Films)
- 2013 German Gastronomic Academy Silver Medal for Jerusalem
- 2013 Observer Food Monthly "Best Cookbook Award" for Jerusalem
- 2014 Specsavers National Book Awards "Food and Drink Book of the Year" for Plenty More
- 2015 Honorary Doctor of Humane Letters from Brandeis University
- 2016 James Beard Award "Cooking from a Professional Point of View" for NOPI, the Cookbook
