= Ethical eating =

Moral food consumption choices

Ethical eating or food ethics refers to the moral consequences of food choices, both those made by humans and animals. Common concerns are damage to the environment, exploitive labor practices, food shortages for others, inhumane treatment of food animals, and the unintended effects of food policy. Ethical eating is a type of ethical consumerism.

== Concerns ==
=== Environmental ===
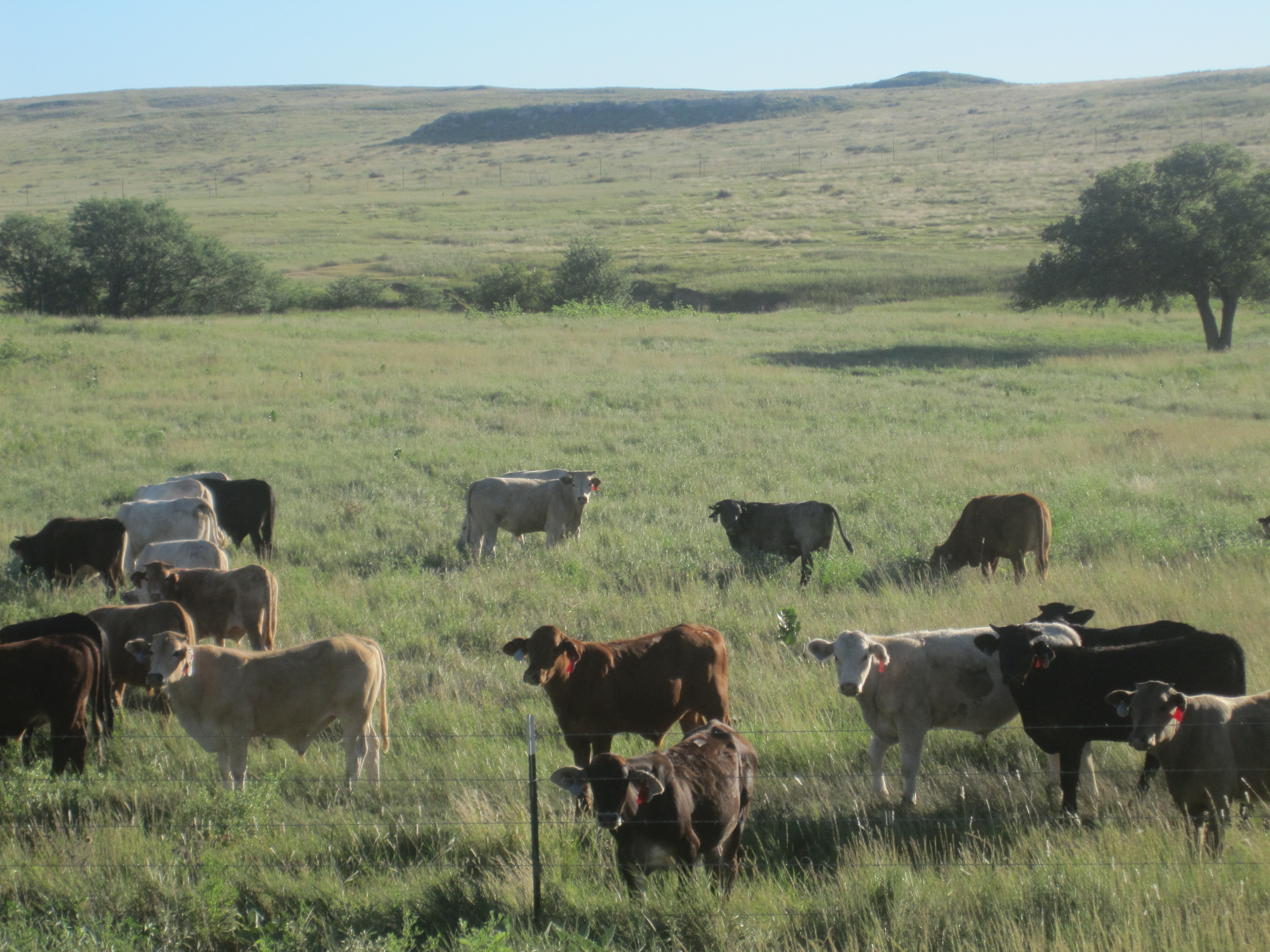
Cattle grazing in Texas

The extent of environmental impacts depends on the methods of food production and types of food. The Union of Concerned Scientists advises that avoiding eating beef may potentially help the environment, because of the large amounts of water needed to produce beef, the pollution from fecal, ammonia, carbon dioxide and methane waste associated with raising cows, the physical damage from grazing, and the destruction of wildlife habitat and rainforests to produce land for grazing. Industrially produced meat, such as that from animals raised in concentrated animal feeding operations (CAFOs), has "the greatest impact of any food product on the environment". Livestock production takes up the majority of agricultural land use, which ultimately results in the increase of methane and nitrous oxide emissions. These two gases are known for being harmful and damaging to the environment. It also takes 7 kilograms of grain to produce 1 kilogram of beef, and the process to convert this requires even more energy and water usage. This poses another ethical dilemma, which is choosing to feed the cattle over people in poverty. The latter is what brings in the most revenue, so that is where the attention and resources go towards.

Packaging of commercially produced foods is also an area of concern, because of the environmental impact of both the production of the packaging and the disposal of the packaging.

Transportation of commercially produced goods can influence the environmental impact of the food products.

=== Labor practices ===
Within the food system there are many low-paid occupations. Many farm workers are paid below-minimum wages or work in substandard conditions, especially farm workers in developing countries and migrant workers in industrialized nations. Through the H-2A guest worker program, farms are able to hire for seasonal work or sometimes grant visas to workers. Due to the cost of this program, the administration of the program has been delayed. Year-round food and farm industries have become reliant on undocumented labor because they are unable to use the H-2 guest worker program. More recently, the topic of concern has been over labor shortages. The solution is investing into automation; new technologies have developed to the point where robots can now perform the tasks of an employee. Jobs within food processing catering and food retailing are also often poorly paid and sometimes hazardous. The conditions in the fields require repetition of the same movements-with little to no breaks, and the workers are oftentimes exposed to toxic chemicals used on the crops. Factory farms are just as dangerous, as workers inhale gas from manure pits. The hydrogen sulfide in the manure has been known to cause bronchitis in the lungs, among other threatening health conditions. Although meat packing plant workers receive better pay, they risk their well-being on the job. The work is presented like an assembly line, and the employees each have to go through the same motions at a fast pace. Many employees have been sent to the hospital from incidents related to the knives and machinery they use.

=== Distribution of wealth ===
Since the 1980s, policies promoting global free trade have increased the amount of food exported from poorer countries, which may adversely affect the food available for their own populations. Campaign to reduce levels of food imports, however, may reduce the incomes of farmers in poorer countries, who rely on export sales.

=== Food availability ===
Since the 1970s, the food system has become increasingly global and a small number of multi-national corporations now dominate trade in many food products. One result is that the proportion of industrially processed foods in diets is increasing globally.

=== Animal welfare ===
The welfare of animals who are farmed for food is considered a major source of concern, especially when they are farmed intensively, which can lead to negative welfare outcomes.

== Specific food choices ==
Take a Bite Out Of Climate Change flashcards

=== Meat ===
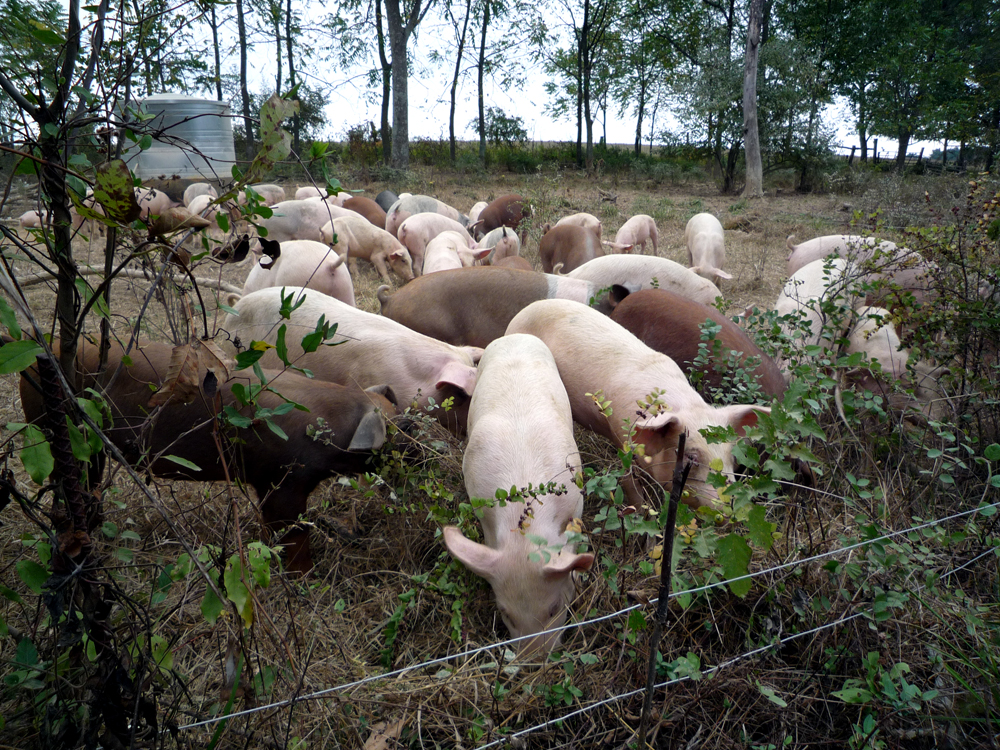
Free-range pigs grazing at Polyface Farm, which promotes 'more sustainable' methods of animal husbandry

Some ethicists argue that the keeping and killing of animals for human consumption is in itself unethical. Others point out that animal husbandry is "essential to sustainable farms, which don't rely on fossil fuels and chemicals," rather using animal waste as fertilizer and animal activity as weed and pest control and using animals to "convert vegetation that's inedible to humans, and growing on marginal, uncultivated land, into food."

The method in which food animals are raised and the type of food animal affect the ethics of eating that animal. Farm-raising is a method of raising food animals with lesser environmental impacts.

=== Dairy and eggs ===
Dairy and egg production have ethical consequences, in particular in large-scale industrialized production. Chickens and milk-animals raised in industrial operations are often treated less fairly for commercial purposes.

Male chicks serve no use in the egg industry because they can't lay eggs or be used for meat production. Shortly after hatching they are separated and placed onto a conveyor belt to be killed. Sick and weak female chicks are also inspected and grouped together with the males to be killed. The two ways of doing this involve either being thrown into a grinder or being gassed to death. The healthy females are transported to another facility where they grow until they are able to lay eggs. Once those chickens are unable to produce more eggs, they are then killed. This usually happens around 18 months, which is premature for their typical lifespan. This is due to the unnatural conditions for the chickens, such as confinement in battery cages, surgical beak procedures, forced molting, and genetic mutations that lead to health complications.

Small-scale production of eggs, such as by backyard chicken raisers and small diversified farms raising pastured birds or milk-animals, are less ethically fraught but still create some issues for ethicists.

=== Seafood ===
Industrial fishing has broad effects with ethical consequences. An example is nutrient and chemical pollution. The seafood industry has also been criticized due to issues with forced labor. Much of the seafood in the United States is imported from overseas, which means that certain regulations are out of jurisdiction and no longer apply. The standards aren't as high in other countries, which has led to problems with extortion. For example, Thailand has been known to participate in illegal, unregulated, and unreported fishing. Ships and vessels depend on third parties for recruitment, meaning U.S. companies that get seafood from international locations are unable to keep track of supply chains. It's common for these third party agencies to hire migrants, who are easier to take advantage because of their vulnerability. Human trafficking has been another issue in some regions.

=== Crops ===
Some foods produced in developing countries are exported in quantities that threaten the ability of local residents to affordably obtain their traditional foods. Western demand for quinoa, a traditional food in Bolivia Peru and Ecuador, has become so high that producers are eating significantly less of the grain, preferring to sell it for import instead and sparking concerns about malnutrition.

== Criticism ==
Some critics of the food ethics movement argue that parsing the various concerns is futile.

Fairtrade International, the certifying body for Fair Trade products, has been accused of "misleading consumers about its ability to monitor production practices" and giving Fairtrade certification to at least one coffee association despite the fact they were "illegally growing some 20 per cent of its coffee in protected national forest land."
