= Zarat, Siazan =

Zarat
- Municipality
- Location within Azerbaijan
- Coordinates: 40°56′57″N 49°17′01″E
- Country: Azerbaijan
- Rayon: Siazan

Population
  - Total: 1,440
- Time zone: UTC+4 (AZT)
  - Summer (DST): UTC+5 (AZT)

Zarat (also, Zabrat; Tat: Zərat) is a village and municipality in the Siazan Rayon of Azerbaijan. It has a population of 1,440. The municipality consists of the villages of Zarat, Qalaşıxı, and Cəndəhar. The native people of Zarat are Tats.
