= Allahyarlı =

Allahyarlı or Alakhyarly or Allakhyarly may refer to:

- Allahyarlı, Beylagan, Azerbaijan
- Allahyarlı, Davachi, Azerbaijan
- Allahyarlı, Masally, Azerbaijan
- Allahyarlı, Siazan, Azerbaijan
