= Hişgədərə =

Hişgədərə or Hişkədərə or Khashka-Dara or Khashkadere or Khashkadara or Keshkedar or Khyshkadar may refer to:

- Hişgədərə, Masally, Azerbaijan
- Hişgədərə, Siazan, Azerbaijan
