= Qaragöz =

Qaragöz or Karagëz may refer to:

- Qaragöz, Siazan, Azerbaijan
- Qaragöz, Zangilan, Azerbaijan
