= Çarxana =

Çarxana or Charkhana or Charkhany may refer to:

- Çarxana, Qabala, Azerbaijan
- Çarxana, Siazan, Azerbaijan
