= Siyəzən (disambiguation) =

Siyəzən or Siyazan or Siazan may refer to:

- Siyəzən, Azerbaijan
- Siyəzən, Beşdam, Azerbaijan
- Siyəzən Rayon, Azerbaijan

== See also ==
- Siazan
