= Tat people (Iran) =

Iranian ethnic group in Northern Iran

Tats
Total population
- c. 300,000

Regions with significant populations
- Northern Iran, especially Qazvin province

Languages
- Tati

Religion
- Islam, Zoroastrianism

Related ethnic groups
- Talyshis, Gilaks, Mazanderanis, and other Iranian peoples

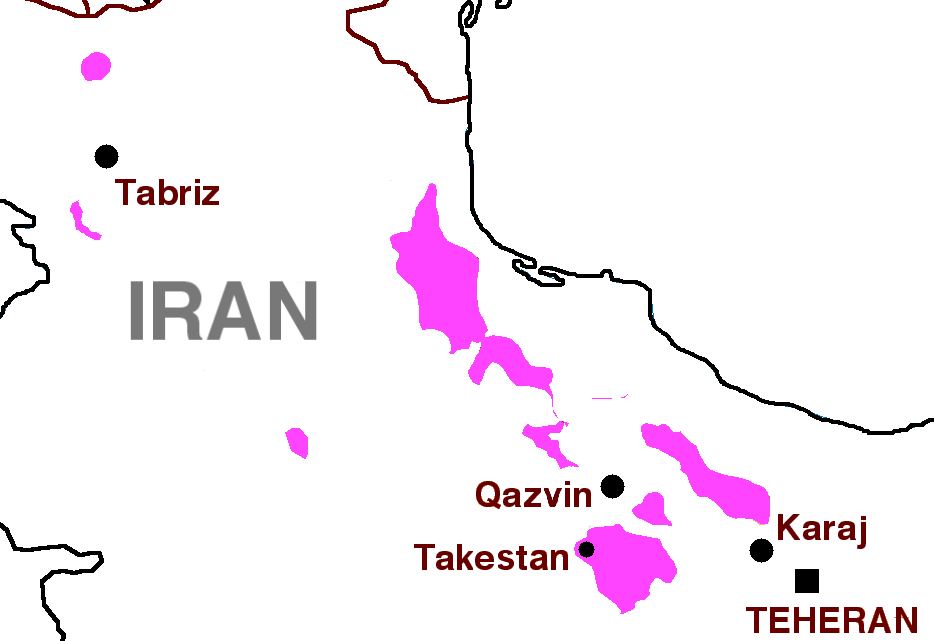
Tati speaking areas in Iran

The Tats (Tati: Irünə Tâtün, ایرون تاتون) are an Iranian people living in northern Iran, especially in Qazvin province. The Tats of Iran are mainly Shia Muslims and number about 300,000.

The Tat population in Iran is estimated at about 300,000.

== Etymology ==
Starting from the Middle Ages, the term Tati was used not only for the Caucasus but also for northwestern Iran, where it was extended to almost all of the local Iranian languages except Persian and Kurdish.

== Language ==
The Tats of Iran use the Tati language, a group of northwestern Iranian dialects which are closely related to the Talysh and Zaza. Persian and Iranian Azerbaijani are also spoken.

Currently, the term Tati and Tati language is used to refer to a particular group of north-western Iranian dialects (Chali, Danesfani, Hiaraji, Hoznini, Esfarvarini, Takestani, Sagzabadi, Ebrahimabadi, Eshtehardi, Hoini, Kajali, Shahroudi, Harzani) in Iranian Azerbaijan, as well as south of it in the provinces of Qazvin and Zanjan. These dialects have a certain affinity to the Talysh language, Mazanderani language and may be descendants of the extinct Old Azari language.

== Notable Tats ==
- Alireza Jahanbakhsh, Iranian footballer who plays for Iran and Feyenoord

== See also ==
- Tat people (Caucasus)
- Tati language (Iran)
- Tat language (Caucasus)
- History of Tat people
