= Nardaran (disambiguation) =

Nardaran or Nardayan may refer to:

- Nardaran, Baku, Azerbaijan
- Nardaran, Gobustan, Azerbaijan
- Nardaran, Siazan, Azerbaijan
