= Alayaz =

Emoz Alyaz may refer to:

- Emoz Alyaz, India
- Artabuynk, Armenia
- Yeghegis, Armenia
- Yanıq Alayaz, Azerbaijan
- Yuxarı Alayaz, Azerbaijan
