= Qərəh =

Coordinates: 41°07′N 48°59′E

Qərəh (also, Garah) is a village in the municipality of Məşrif in the Siazan District of Azerbaijan.
