= Takyaliakty =

- Location within Azerbaijan
- Coordinates: 40°54′15″N 49°14′46″E
- Country: Azerbaijan
- Rayon: Siazan
- Time zone: UTC+4 (AZT)
  - Summer (DST): UTC+5 (AZT)

Takyaliakty is a village in the Siazan Rayon of Azerbaijan.
