= Hacışəkər =

Village in Azerbaijan

Coordinates: 40°57′N 49°00′E

Hacışəkər is a village in the municipality of Yuxarı Ələz in the Siazan Rayon of Azerbaijan.
