= Beşdam =

- Municipality
- Location within Azerbaijan
- Coordinates: 40°59′37″N 49°12′11″E
- Country: Azerbaijan
- Rayon: Siazan

Population
  - Total: 691
- Time zone: UTC+4 (AZT)
  - Summer (DST): UTC+5 (AZT)

Beşdam (also, Bəşdam) is a village and municipality in the Siazan Rayon of Azerbaijan. It has a population of 691. The municipality consists of the villages of Beşdam, Dərə Zarat, Nardaran, and Siyəzən.
