= Qozağacı =

- Municipality
- Location within Azerbaijan
- Coordinates: 41°06′04″N 48°59′16″E
- Country: Azerbaijan
- Rayon: Siazan

Population
  - Total: 378
- Time zone: UTC+4 (AZT)
  - Summer (DST): UTC+5 (AZT)

Qozağacı (also, Kozagadzhi and Kozagadzhy) is a village and municipality in the Siazan Rayon of Azerbaijan. It has a population of 378.
