= List of historical reserves in Azerbaijan =

This is a list of historical reserves in Azerbaijan, which includes 29 historical reserves in the Republic of Azerbaijan.

Of these reserves, 14 are historical and cultural; eight are historical and architectural, and two are historical and artistic. Yanardag functions as a historical, cultural and natural reserve. Three of the reserves are located on the territory of the Nakhchivan Autonomous Republic. Icherisheher, Gobustan and Yuxari Bash nature reserves are a UNESCO World Heritage Site, and Ateshgah, Ordubad and Shusha are on the list of candidates.

== Approval process ==
According to the Resolution of the Cabinet of Ministers of Azerbaijan "On approval of the Model Regulations on Memorial Reserves", the reserve is a state-protected territory and settlements where historical and cultural monuments, archaeological and architectural objects, ethnographic, numismatic, epigraphic, anthropological materials, buildings, memorials, objects related to historical events and personalities are located. Archaeological, ethnographic, architectural, urban planning and other complexes of special importance have been declared nature reserves by the order of the President of Azerbaijan.

== List ==
| No. | Name | Date listed | Brief information | Notes |
|---|---|---|---|---|
| 1 | Gulustan historical and cultural reserve | | Includes: Jugha bridge, caravanserai, Jugha fortress, mausoleum, church, necropolis, khanagah Alinjachai, etc. | |
| 2 | Nardaran historical and cultural reserve | | Includes: Safavid caravanserai, Haji Bakhshi mosque, Nardaran mosque, Pirsaid mosque, Juma mosque, Said Yusif mosque, Nardaran fortress, Khan's bath, Gazi Mausoleum. | |
| 3 | Icherisheher historical and architectural reserve | | Monuments of world significance: the Maiden Tower, the Palace of Shirvanshahs, Muhammad mosque. | |
| 3 | Icherisheher historical and architectural reserve | | Monuments of state significance: Agha Mikail bathhouse, caravanserai, Baku Fortress, Molla Ahmed mosque, Gasim bey bathhouse, Haji mosque, Khanlar mosque, Ashura mosque, Sheikh Ibrahim mosque, Hazrat Ali mosque, Gileyli mosque, Juma mosque, Market Square, Khan's Palace, underground bathhouse, Baba Kuhi Bakuvi mosque. | |
| 3 | Icherisheher historical and architectural reserve | | Monuments of local significance: Beyler mosque, St. Nicholas Church, St. Bartholomew Church, Agha Zeynal bath, Haji Eibat Mosque, Mirza Ahmed mosque, Haji Gaib mosque, shah's house, arched building. caravanserai. | |
| 4 | Chiraggala and Shabran historical and cultural reserve | | Includes: semicircular towers, a quadrangular fortress, a workshop for the production of ceramic wares. | |
| 5 | "Old city Shamkir" state historical and cultural reserve | | Includes: ruins of ancient Shamkir, bridge, Shamkir fortress, Maiden Tower, Abbasly mosque, Korogly fortress, German church, Oguz cemetery, Christian church, German kirkha. | |
| 6 | Yanardag historical, cultural and nature reserve | | Includes: Gurd Yuvasi, Gyrmyaki hollow and Yanardag Mountain itself. | |
| 7 | Gobustan state historical and artistic reserve | | Includes: Rock carvings and ancient sites, camps named Ana Zaga, Firuz-1, Jeyranlar, Firuz-2, Shongar, Maral, petroglyphs, Gavaldash. | |
| 8 | Khynalig historical, architectural and ethnographic reserve | | Includes: Temple of fire worshippers, tomb of Khidyr Nabi, Sheikh Shalbuz mosque, Abu Muslim mosque, caves, etc. | |
| 9 | Keshikchidag historical and cultural reserve | | Includes: Keshikchidag, Bertuban, Chichikuri, Udabno monasteries. | |
| 10 | Ateshgah historical and architectural reserve | | Includes: temple, chapel, 26 cells and a caravanserai (1713). | |
| 11 | Gandja historical and cultural reserve | | Includes: old city Gandja, Gandja fortress, tomb of Imamzade. | |
| 12 | Gala historical and ethnographic reserve | | Includes: 7 monuments of state and 34 monuments of local significance. | |
| 13 | Shusha historical and architectural reserve | | Includes: Shusha fortress, Gandja gates, Irevan gates, Aghoglan gates, divankhana, Rasta bazaar, Sheitan bazaar, Palace of the Karabakh Khan, Palace of Ibrahimhalil khan, Palace of Karaboyuk khanum, Palace of Mukhammedgasan agha, house of Khurshidbanu Natavan, house of the Mehmandarovs, house of the Hajibeyovs, house of the Zohrabbekovs, house of the Safarbekovs, house of the Faramazovs, house of the Beybutovs, house of the Gadimovs, houses of Mir Mohsun Navvab, Asad bey, Jafargulu agha, Abdurrahim bey Hagverdiyev, Yusif Vezir Chemenzaminli, Sadygjan, Seyid Shushinsky, Bulbul, Firudin bey Kocharli, Kechachi oglu Muhammad, Suleiman Sani Akhundov, Geray Asadov, Jabbar Garyagdioglu, Suleiman Vezirov, Najaf bey Vezirov, Khanlyk caravanserai, Kazan Cathedral, Church of St. John the Baptist, Church of the Mother of God, Maiden Monastery, Upper and Lower Gevhar Agha mosques, Haji Yusifli mosque, Saatli Mosque, Malybeyli Mosque, Julfalar Mosque, Chukhur Mahalla mosque, Chol Gala mosque, Kocharli mosque, Mamay mosque, Mardinli mosque, Guyulug mosque, Seyidli mosque, Khoja Marjanli mosque, Malbeyli bathouse etc. | |
| 14 | Yuxari-bash historical and architectural reserve | | Includes: Nukha fortress, Palace of Shaki Khans, Shakikhanovs house, Lower and Upper caravanserais, Khan mosque, Juma mosque, Omar Efendi mosque, Gilakhli mosque, Imam Ali mosque, Agvan bath, etc. | |
| 15 | Basgal historical and cultural reserve | | Includes: two monuments of local significance. | |
| 16 | Lahij historical and cultural reserve | | Includes: 93 monuments of local significance. | |
| 17 | Kish historical and cultural reserve | | Includes: Necropolis. | |
| 18 | Ordubad historical and cultural reserve | | Includes: Yuxari Ailis Church, St. Thomas Church, Juma mosque, Meiramcha, Yetim, Dilber, Mingis, Gyrkhayag mosques, Ashagi and Yuxari Ambaras, Angam mosque, Eyvaz and Der mausoleums. | |
| 19 | Zagatala historical and cultural reserve | | Includes: 19 monuments of local significance. | |
| 20 | Gabala historical and cultural reserve | | The area of the reserve consists of three parts: ancient town, Salbir and Gala. There is an archaeological centre functioning in the reserve. | |
| 21 | Avey historical and cultural reserve | | Includes the Damjili cave. | |
| 22 | Ilisu historical and cultural reserve | | Includes: Ulu bridge, Juma mosque, Sumug fortress, Shamilgala (Galacha) fortress, Jinli-gala fortress, Ram-rama waterfall. | |
| 23 | Gamigaya historical and artistic reserve | | Includes petroglyphs. | |
| 24 | Khanegah of Pir Huseyn historical and architectural reserve | | Includes: a mosque with a minaret, a complex surrounded by fortress walls, etc. | |
| 25 | "The Palace of Shirvanshahs" state historical and architectural reserve-museum | | Includes: the Palace of Shirvanshahs, Divankhana, Keykubad Mosque, tomb of Seyid Yahya Bakuvi, Murad's Gates, Shah's mosque, tomb of the Shirvanshahs, bathhouses. | |
| 26 | "Medieval town of Aghsu" state historical and cultural reserve | | Includes the medieval town of Aghsu. | |
| 27 | Guba Genocide Memorial Complex | | Includes a complex of remains of the victims of the March genocide of 1918. | |
| 28 | Arpachay historical and cultural reserve | | Includes: Oglangala, Gazma cave, Akhurin necropolis etc. | |
| 29 | "Besh barmag Mountain" state historical, cultural and nature reserve | June 8, 2020 | Includes: Besh Barmag Mountain and the Pir Khidir Zinda. | |

== See also ==
- State reserves of Azerbaijan
