= Məlhəm =

- Municipality
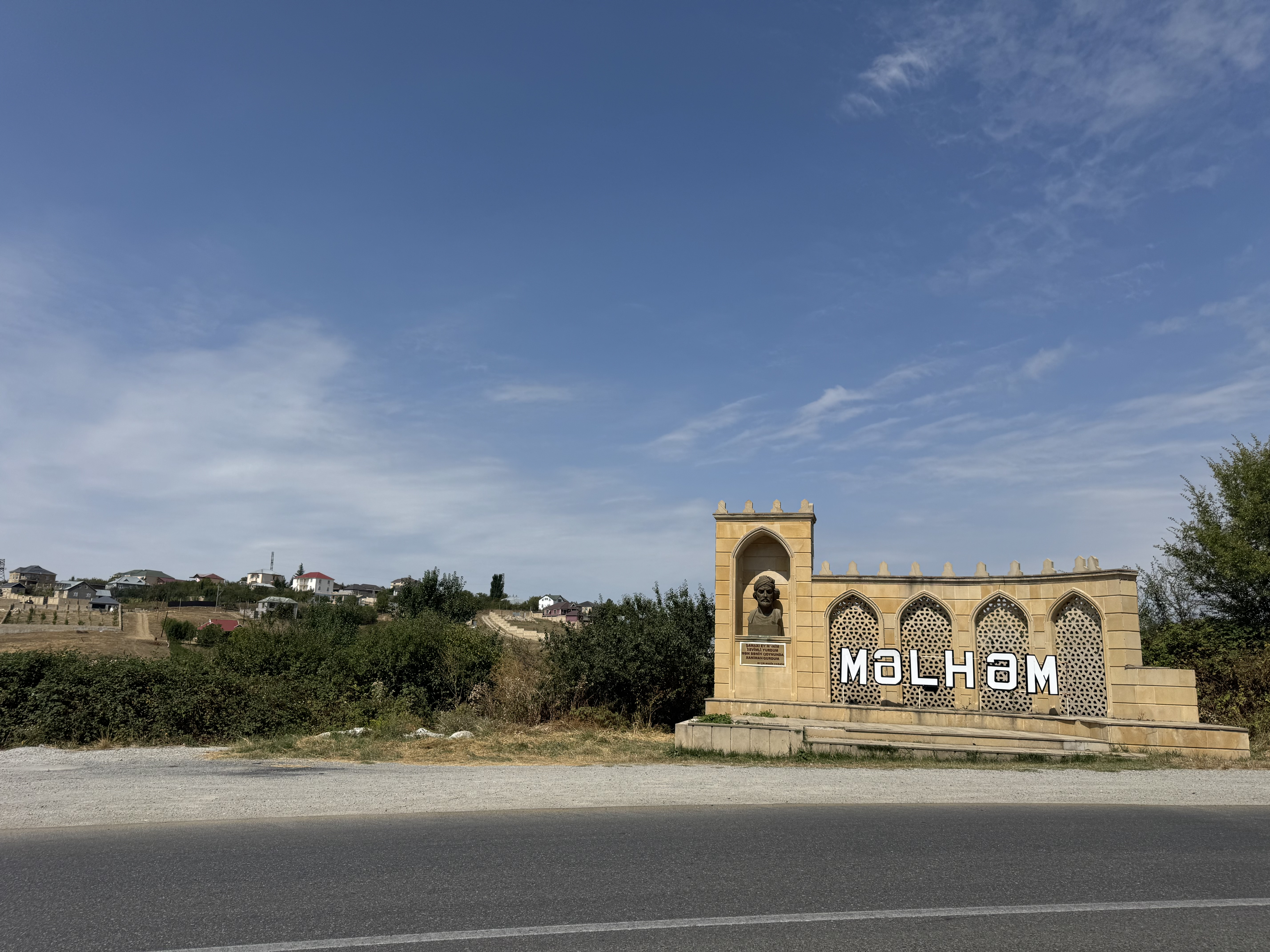

- Location within Azerbaijan
- Coordinates: 40°41′30″N 48°37′50″E
- Country: Azerbaijan
- Rayon: Shamakhi

Population
  - Total: 1,378
- Time zone: UTC+4 (AZT)
  - Summer (DST): UTC+5 (AZT)

Məlhəm (also, Mel’gam and Mel’kham) is a village and municipality in the Shamakhi Rayon of Azerbaijan. It has a population of 1,378.

Khaqani was born in this village.

Part of the village residents are Tats and they speak the Tat language, which belongs to the Iranian language group. Due to the economic difficulties that arose after the collapse of the USSR, a large number of rural residents migrated, especially to Russia. The population of the village is 1347, of which 687 are men and 660 are women. [1]

== Notable residents ==
Khaqani
