= Eynibulaq =

- Municipality
- Location within Azerbaijan
- Coordinates: 41°06′35″N 49°01′53″E
- Country: Azerbaijan
- Rayon: Siazan

Population
  - Total: 915
- Time zone: UTC+4 (AZT)
  - Summer (DST): UTC+5 (AZT)

Eynibulaq (also, Eynibulag, Eyni-Bulagi, and Eynibulak) is a village and municipality in the Siazan Rayon of Azerbaijan. It has a population of 915.
