= Qonaqkənd =

Qonaqkənd or Konakh-Kent or Konagkend or Konakkend or Konakhkend may refer to:

- Qonaqkənd, Quba, Azerbaijan
- Qonaqkənd, Shamakhi, Azerbaijan
