= Dərə Zarat =

- Location within Azerbaijan
- Coordinates: 40°59′11″N 49°06′55″E
- Country: Azerbaijan
- Rayon: Siazan
- Municipality: Beşdam
- Time zone: UTC+4 (AZT)
  - Summer (DST): UTC+5 (AZT)

Dərə Zarat (also, Dərəzarat, Derezarat, and Dere-Zorat) is a village in the Siazan Rayon of Azerbaijan. The village forms part of the municipality of Beşdam.
