= Tat language (Caucasus) =

Southwestern Iranian language of Azerbaijan and Russia

Tat
- zuhun tati, зугьун тати
- Native to: Azerbaijan, Dagestan (Russia)
- Region: Caucasus
- Ethnicity: Tats, Armeno-Tats
- Native speakers: 34,000 excluding Judeo-Tat (2011–2020 census)
- Language family: Indo-European: Indo-Iranian; Iranian; Western Iranian; Southwestern Iranian; Persian; Tat
- Writing system: In Azerbaijan: Latin (Azerbaijani alphabet); In Russia: basic Cyrillic plus digraphs; Among Armeno-Tats: Armenian alphabet

Official status
- Official language in: Russia: Dagestan

Language codes
- ISO 639-3: ttt
- Glottolog: cauc1242 Caucasian Tat musl1236 Muslim Tat
- Linguasphere: 58-AAC-g
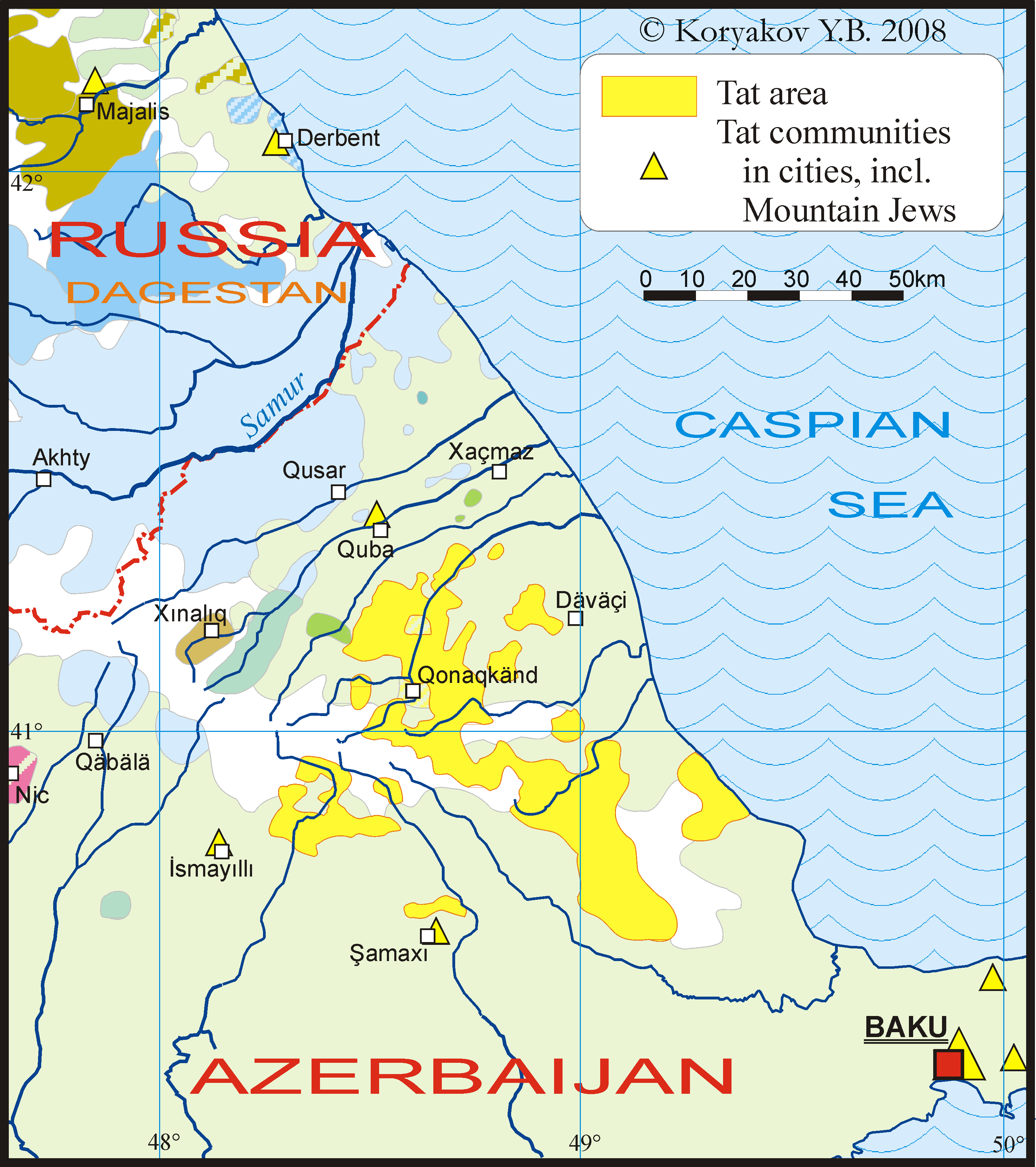

- Tat is classified as Severely Endangered by the UNESCO Atlas of the World's Languages in Danger

Tat, also known as Caucasian Persian, Tat/Tati Persian, or Caucasian Tat, is a Southwestern Iranian language closely related to Persian and spoken by the Tats in Azerbaijan and Russia.

== General information ==
The Tats are an indigenous Iranian people in the Caucasus who trace their origin to the Sassanid-period migrants from Iran (ca. fifth century AD).

Tat is endangered, classified as "severely endangered" by UNESCO's Atlas of the World's Languages in Danger. Most scholars divide Tat into two primary varieties: Jewish and Muslim, with religious differences correlating with linguistic differences.

Another, almost extinct, variety of Tat is spoken by Christians of Armenian origin, who are referred to as Armeno-Tats.

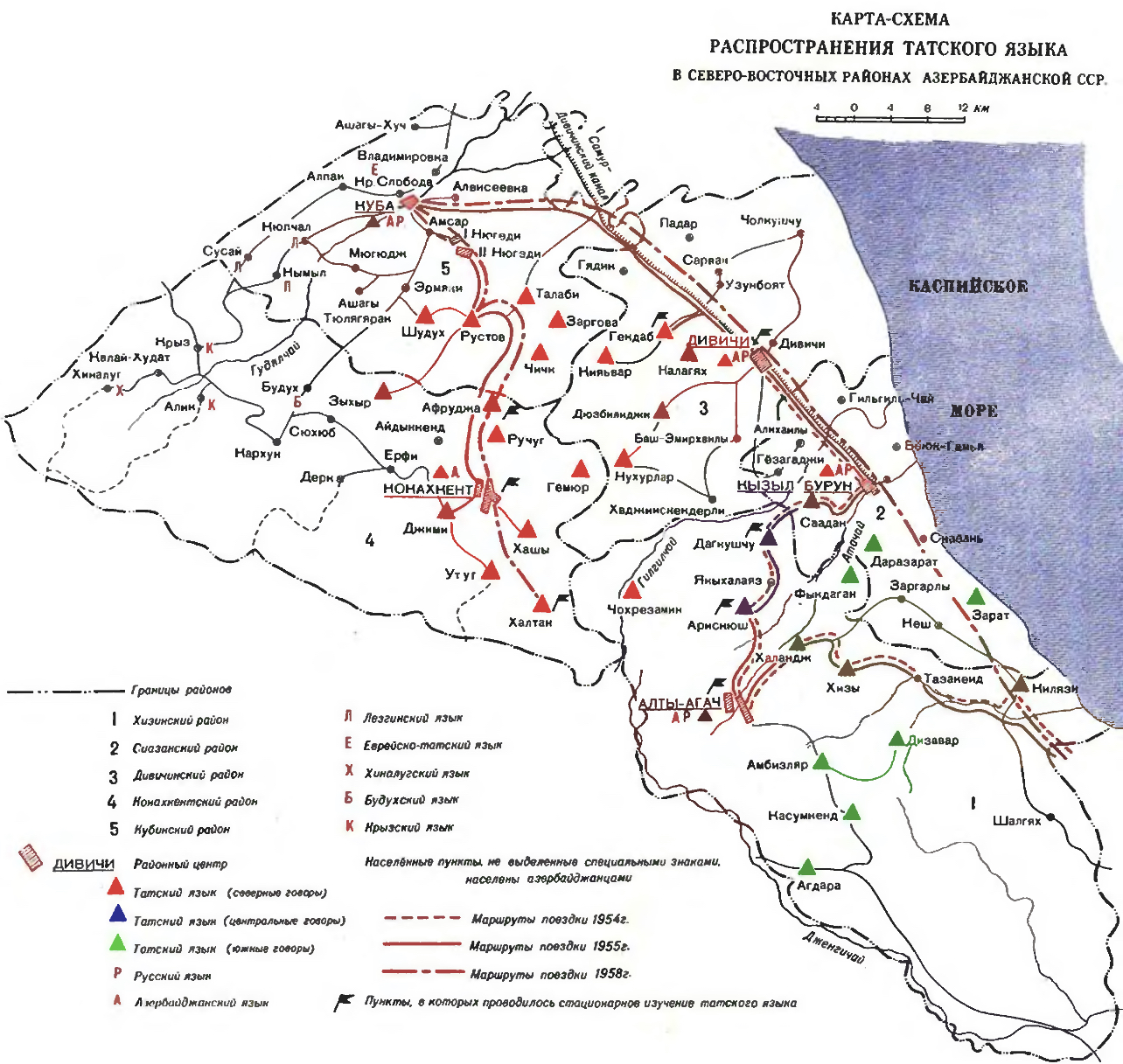
Map of the Tat dialects' distribution according to Aleksandr Gryunberg-Tsvetinovich

== Classification ==
Caucasian Tat is classified within the Southwestern Iranian branch of the Western Iranian languages. Within this specific sub-branch, Tati shares a close genetic relationship with Persian.

- Southwestern Iranian
  - Farsic-Caucasian Tat
    - Caucasian Tat
      - Judeo-Tat
        - Central Judeo-Tat, Northern Judeo-Tat, Southern Judeo-Tat
      - Muslim Tat
        - Absheron, Mədrəsə, Northern Muslim Tat, Şirvan Muslim Tat, Xızı

== Dialects ==
Vladimir Minorsky mentions in the first edition of Encyclopaedia of Islam that similar to most Persian dialects, Tati is not very regular in its characteristics, and occupies a position between modern Persian and the Caspian dialects. According to him, The Great Russian Encyclopedia of 1901 gives the number of Tati speakers in 1901 as 135,000. In the 1930s, Minorsky estimated the number of Tati speakers to be 90,000 and the decrease to be the result of gradual Turkicization.

=== Variants ===
- Aruskush-Daqqushchu
- Lahyj
- Balakhani
- Devechi
- Qyzyl Qazma
- Qonaqkend
- Absheron
- Surakhani
- Northern Tats
- Malham
- Quba

== Speakers ==
According to the 1989 Soviet census, 30,000 Tats lived in the Soviet Union, of which 10,000 were in Azerbaijan. Not all likely speak Tati, and this does not include the more rural locations that were not reached by the census. It is vital to stress that the Tats are one of the most assimilated of Azerbaijan’s ethnic groups. This is particularly true for urban Tats. All of this makes it difficult to identify the true number of the Tat ethnic group.

The adults in most of the mountain and foothill communities reported they use Tat as their main language of interaction. They speak Tat with each other, but speak Azerbaijani with their children so that they will learn the language before beginning school. If the wife in the family is non-Tat speaking, however, the family is most likely to use Azerbaijani in the home. In the villages of Lahıc and Zǝyvǝ, women who marry in are reported to learn Tat.

== Ethnic population ==
Research has demonstrated that the word “Tat” does not have an ethnic origin. This is the term the Turks used to denote the settled Iranian-speaking population of Azerbaijan. This is proven by the names some groups of the Tat population have given themselves. For example, the residents of the Apsheron settlements of Balakhany and Surakhany call themselves Pars, and those of the settlement of Lagich in the Ismailly district the Lohudj. It must be mentioned that in the 19th century, cattle herders called the seasonal workers from southern Azerbaijan Tat, although they were ethnic Turks.

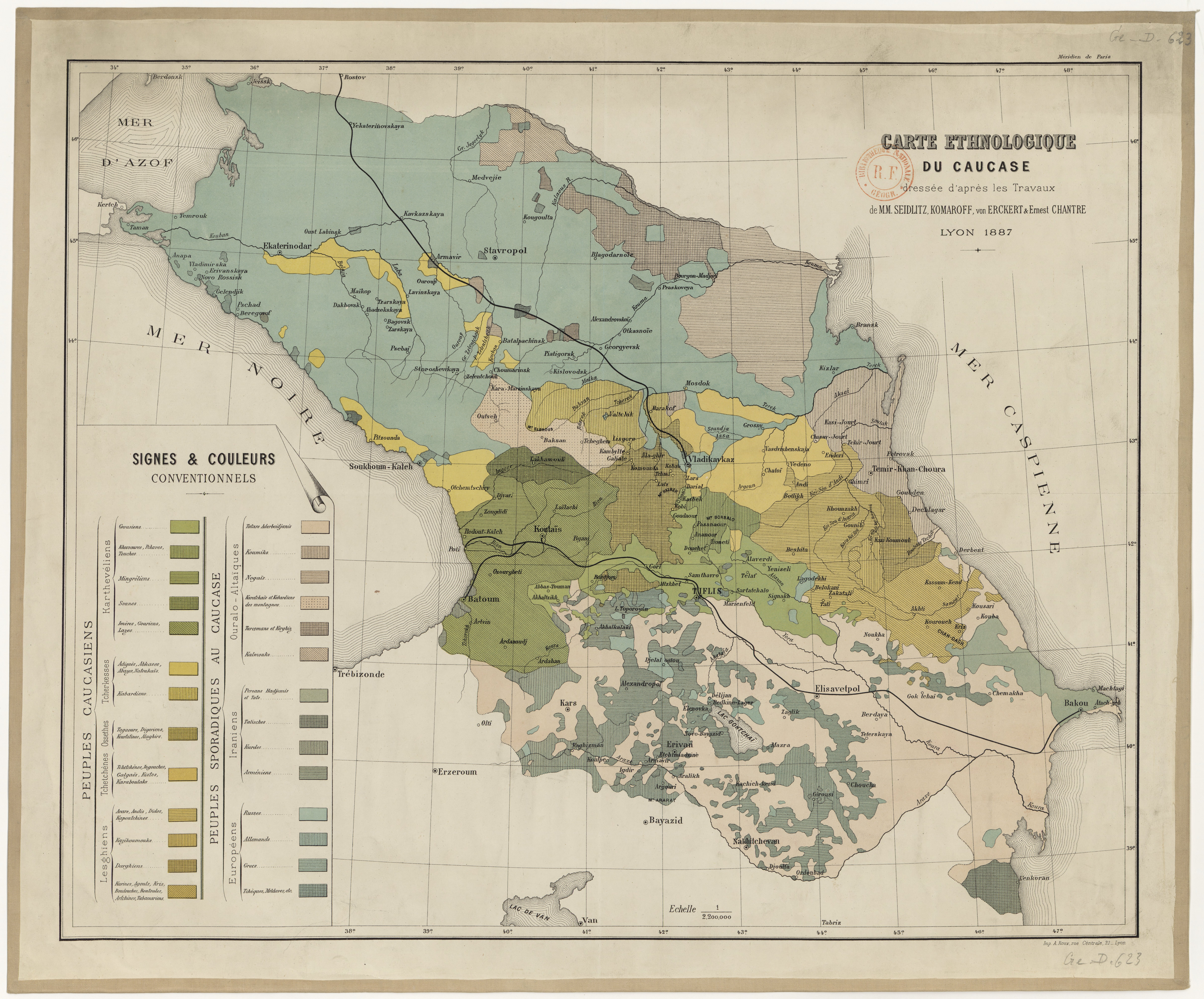
Spread of Tat in 1887

=== Case study: Mǝlhǝm ===
The town of Mǝlhǝm is largely Tat. Mǝlhǝm lies 6 km north of Şamaxı town on the A12 road. An estimated 1,500 residents live in Mǝlhǝm, a number higher than five years ago. The increase in population is primarily due to an increase in birth rate. According to the mayor, while approximately 10–15% of residents go to Baku to study or work, most return. Ethnically, the village is made up entirely of Tats, with the exception of a handful of ethnic Azerbaijani brides.

Major Persian poet and prose-writer Khaqani was born in this village.

== Phonology ==
The following information is of the dialect of Apsheron:

=== Consonants ===
		Labial	Dental/ Alveolar	Post- alveolar	Palatal	Velar	Glottal
Plosive	voiceless	p	t		(c)	k	
Plosive	voiced	b	d		ɟ	ɡ	
Affricate	voiceless			tʃ			
Affricate	voiced			dʒ			
Fricative	voiceless	f	s	ʃ		x	h
Fricative	voiced	v	z	(ʒ)		ɣ	
Nasal		m	n				
Trill			r				
Approximant			l		j		

- Stop sounds /t, d/ are phonetically dental as [t̪, d̪]
- /ʒ/ is mainly heard from loanwords.
- Velar fricative sounds /x, ɣ/ can be heard in free variation as uvular fricative sounds [χ, ʁ].
- /k/ is heard as palatal [c] when preceding front vowels, and occurs as velar [k] elsewhere.
- Sounds /ʒ, d͡ʒ/ can also be heard as retroflex sounds [ʐ, d͡ʐ].

=== Vowels ===
	Front		Back
High	i	y	u
Mid	e	œ	o
Low	æ		ɑ

- A back-unrounded vowel /ɯ/, can also appear, but only as a result of Azeri loanwords.

== Writing system ==
Tat was not written until 1935. Efforts are being made at preservation. "Since 1996, the Azerbaijani government has provided money for the development of minority languages, including Tat. Haciyev (personal communication) reports that Tat classes have been started in several schools in the Quba region using an alphabet based on the current Azerbaijani Latin alphabet."

== Vocabulary ==
English	Tat	Persian	Tajik	Zaza	Kurmanji
big	kələ	bozorg, kalān	kalān	gırd, pil	girs, mezin, kale
blood	xun	xūn	xun	goni	xûn, xwîn
bread	nun	nān	nān	nan, non	nan
bride	ərüs	arus	arūs	veyve	bûk
cat	pişik, nazu	gorbe, pišak	pišak, gurba	pısing	pisîk, kitik, pişîle
cry (v)	girəstən	gerīstan	giristan	bermayen	girîn
dark	târîk, tariki	tārīk	tārik	tari	tarî
brother	birar	barādar, birār (local dialects, i.e. Herat)	barādar, dādar, aka, uka	bıra	bira, birat, birar
father	piyər	pedar, piyar (local dialects, i. e. Herat)	padar, dada/dado	pi, pêr	bav, bab
mother	may, dədə	mādar	mādar, buva, māma, nana	may, dadî	dayik, dade
day	ruz	ruz	rūz	roce, roje, roze	roj
night	şöü	šab	šab	şew, şü	şev
donkey	xər	xar	xar	her	ker
egg	xaykərg	toxm, xaye	tuxm	hak	hêk
eye	çüm	češm	cašm	çım	çav, çüm
fear (v)	tərsirən	tarsidan	tarsidan	tersayen	tirsîn
fire	âtaş	âtaš	ātaš, ālāb	adır	agir
God	Xuda	Xodā, Yazdān	Xudā, Yazdān, Ēzid	Homa, Huma, Oma, Heq	Xweda, Xudê, Xwedê, Yezdan
good	xub, xas	xub	nağz, xub, xuš	hewl, rınd, weş	baş, rind
plant (n)	güyo	giyāh	giyāh	vaş	giya, çêre
house (n)	xunə	xāne	xāna	keye	xanî
language	zuhun	zabān	zabān, lafz	zıwan, zon	ziman
moon	ma	māh	māh	aşme	meh, heyv, mang
place (n)	cə, cigə	jā	jā, jāy, -gāh	ca	cih, geh, ce

=== Linguistic migration ===
The prominence of the Tati language is directly related to migration. Additionally, most Tats in Azerbaijan live in the Apsheron zone, as well as the following districts: Khyzy, Divichi and Guba. The Tat people have been dispersed in northeast Azerbaijan. By their origin, the Tats are direct descendants of the Iranian-speaking population that migrated back in the era of the Sassanids to the Caspian coastal regions of Azerbaijan. Most of the Tats in Azerbaijan live in the Apsheron zone and the districts of Khyzy, Divichi, Guba and some others.

=== Tats and Azerbaijanis ===
Coexistence between Tats and Azerbaijanis have combined much of the two cultures. Azerbaijani has largely overtaken Tati, which has also sparked a takeover in the ethnic consciousness of the Tats. The Tats and Azerbaijanis have gained much in common both industrially and culturally and in everyday life from their centuries of co-existence. Here a significant role has been played by the Azerbaijani language, which since the 19th century has been virtually the second native tongue for the Tats. The wide use of Azerbaijani, though, has imposed some constraints on the Tat language, which had become the general language in rural areas. Significant changes have taken place in the ethnic consciousness of the Tats. Many of them consider themselves to be Azerbaijani and have largely lost the Tat language.

== See also ==
- Azerbaijan
- Russia
- Languages of Azerbaijan
- Judeo-Tat
- Tat people (Iran)
- Tati language (Iran)
- Tat alphabet
