= Künövşə =

- Location within Azerbaijan
- Coordinates: 40°56′33″N 48°56′59″E
- Country: Azerbaijan
- Rayon: Siazan
- Municipality: Yuxarı Ələz
- Time zone: UTC+4 (AZT)
  - Summer (DST): UTC+5 (AZT)

Künövşə (officially known as Günəvşa until 2000) is a village in the Siazan Rayon of Azerbaijan. The village forms part of the municipality of Yuxarı Ələz.
