= Xəndək =

Xəndək or Khandek may refer to:

- Xəndək, Qubadli, Azerbaijan
- Xəndək, Siazan, Azerbaijan
