= Məşrif =

- Municipality
- Location within Azerbaijan
- Coordinates: 41°05′42″N 48°57′19″E
- Country: Azerbaijan
- Rayon: Siazan

Population
  - Total: 1,192
- Time zone: UTC+4 (AZT)
  - Summer (DST): UTC+5 (AZT)

Məşrif (also, Meshrif and Meşrif) is a village and municipality in the Siazan Rayon of Azerbaijan. It has a population of 1,192. The municipality consists of the villages of Məşrif, Qalaaltı, Daşlı Çalğan, Qərəh, and Orta Çalğan.
