= Əlməkolu =

- Location within Azerbaijan
- Coordinates: 40°59′N 48°57′E
- Country: Azerbaijan
- Rayon: Siazan
- Municipality: Dağ Quşçu

Population (2014)
  - Total: 4
- Time zone: UTC+4 (AZT)
  - Summer (DST): UTC+5 (AZT)

Əlməkolu (also, Almagovlu and Almakuyuly) is a village in the Siazan Rayon of Azerbaijan. The village forms part of the municipality of Dağ Quşçu. According to Azerbaijan's State Statistics Committee, only four people lived in the village as of 2014.
