= Sədan =

- Municipality
- Location within Azerbaijan
- Coordinates: 41°03′51″N 49°02′32″E
- Country: Azerbaijan
- Rayon: Siazan

Population
  - Total: 1,600
- Time zone: UTC+4 (AZT)
  - Summer (DST): UTC+5 (AZT)

Sədan (also, Saadan and Siadan) is a village and municipality in the Siazan Rayon of Azerbaijan. It has a population of 681. The municipality consists of the villages of Sədan, Müşkülqazma, Sağolcan, and Çarxana.
