= Palkhash =

- Location within Azerbaijan
- Coordinates: 40°58′28″N 48°58′04″E
- Country: Azerbaijan
- Rayon: Siazan
- Time zone: UTC+4 (AZT)
  - Summer (DST): UTC+5 (AZT)

Palkhash is a village in the Siazan Rayon of Azerbaijan.
