= Müşkülqazma =

- Location within Azerbaijan
- Coordinates: 41°03′47″N 49°01′09″E
- Country: Azerbaijan
- Rayon: Siazan
- Municipality: Sədan
- Time zone: UTC+4 (AZT)
  - Summer (DST): UTC+5 (AZT)

Müşkülqazma (also, Mümgülqazma, Mükülqazma, Munyul’ and Myungyul’kazma) is a village in the Siazan Rayon of Azerbaijan. The village forms part of the municipality of Sədan.
