= Orta Çalğan =

- Location within Azerbaijan
- Coordinates: 41°04′57″N 48°58′09″E
- Country: Azerbaijan
- Rayon: Siazan
- Municipality: Məşrif
- Time zone: UTC+4 (AZT)
  - Summer (DST): UTC+5 (AZT)

Orta Çalğan (also, Orta Calğan and Orta Dzhalgan) is a village in the Siazan Rayon of Azerbaijan. The village forms part of the municipality of Məşrif.
