= Sağolcan =

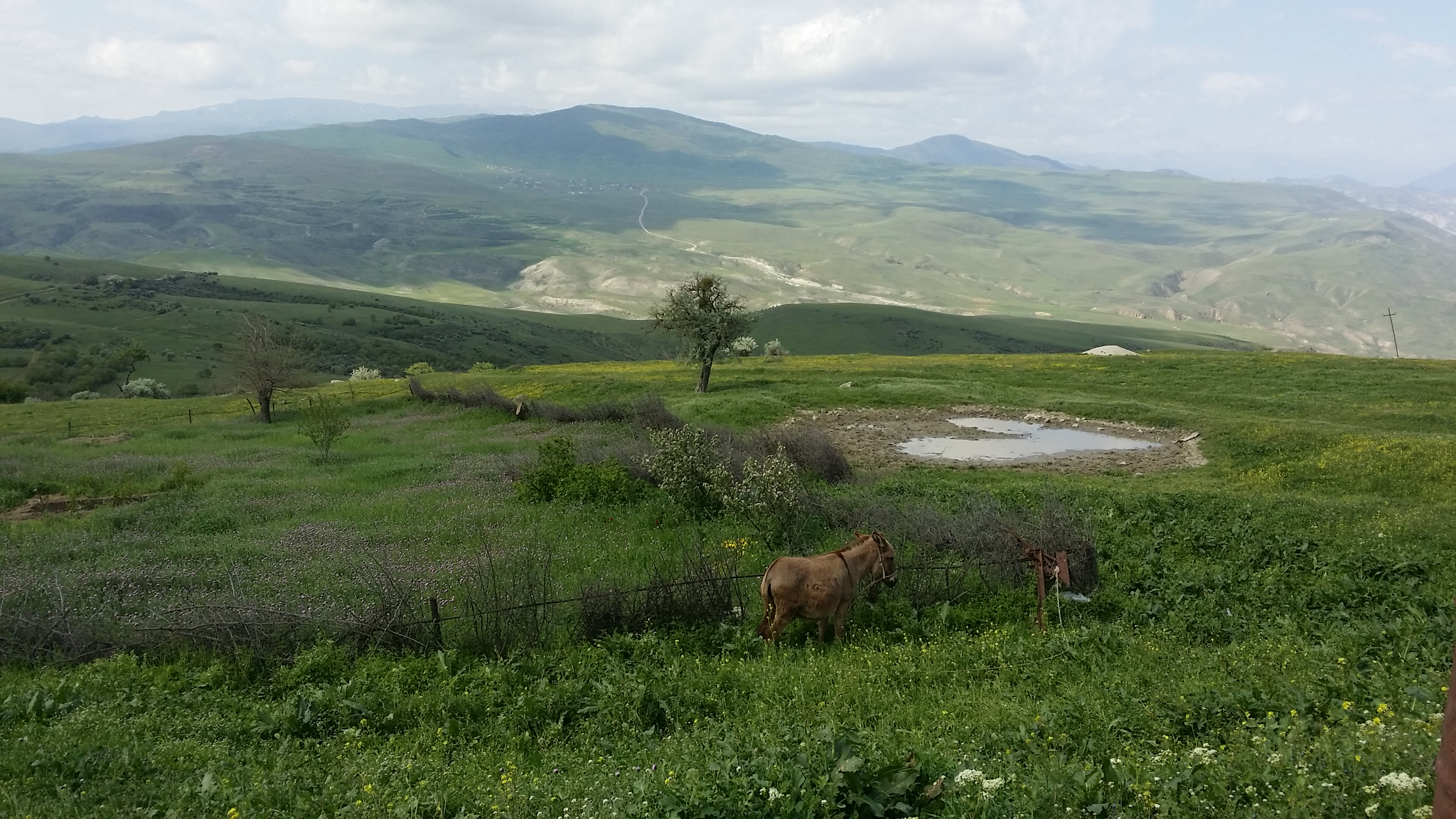

- Location within Azerbaijan
- Coordinates: 41°02′28″N 49°01′12″E
- Country: Azerbaijan
- Rayon: Siazan
- Municipality: Sədan
- Time zone: UTC+4 (AZT)

Sağolcan (also, Sağlocan, Saqolcan, Sagoldzhan, Sakhladzhan, and Sokhuldzhan) is a village in the Siazan Rayon of Azerbaijan. The village forms part of the municipality of Sədan.
