= Chandak =

Chandak may refer to:

- Nikita Chandak, Nepalese model and beauty pageant titleholder
- Pankaj Chandak, Indian-born British surgeon
- Chandak Sengoopta, British-Indian professor

== See also ==
- Chandaka Elephant Sanctuary, Odisha, India
- Chandakhar, Azerbaijan
