= Köhnə Quşçu =

Kohne Gushchu
- Azerbaijani: Köhnə Quşçu
- Location within Azerbaijan
- Coordinates: 40°57′59″N 48°54′41″E
- Country: Azerbaijan
- District: Siazan
- Municipality: Yuxarı Ələz

Population (2015)
  - Total: 12
- Time zone: UTC+4 (AZT)
  - Summer (DST): UTC+5 (AZT)

Köhnə Quşçu (also, Kohne Gushchu) is a village in the Siazan District of Azerbaijan. The village forms part of the municipality of Yuxarı Ələz.
