= Allahyarlı, Siazan =

Allahyarly
- Azerbaijani: Allahyarlı
- Location within Azerbaijan
- Coordinates: 40°57′N 48°59′E
- Country: Azerbaijan
- District: Siazan
- Time zone: UTC+4 (AZT)
  - Summer (DST): UTC+5 (AZT)

Allahyarlı (also, Alahyarly) is a village in the Siazan District of Azerbaijan.
