= Siyəzən, Beşdam =

Siyəzən
- Municipality
- Location within Azerbaijan
- Coordinates: 41°00′13″N 49°10′14″E
- Country: Azerbaijan
- Rayon: Siazan
- Municipality: Beşdam
- Time zone: UTC+4 (AZT)
  - Summer (DST): UTC+5 (AZT)

Siyəzən (also, Siazan’, Karasiyazen, Karasiazan’, and Kafasiyazen) is a village in the Siazan Rayon of Azerbaijan. The village forms part of the municipality of Beşdam.
