= History of Tat people =

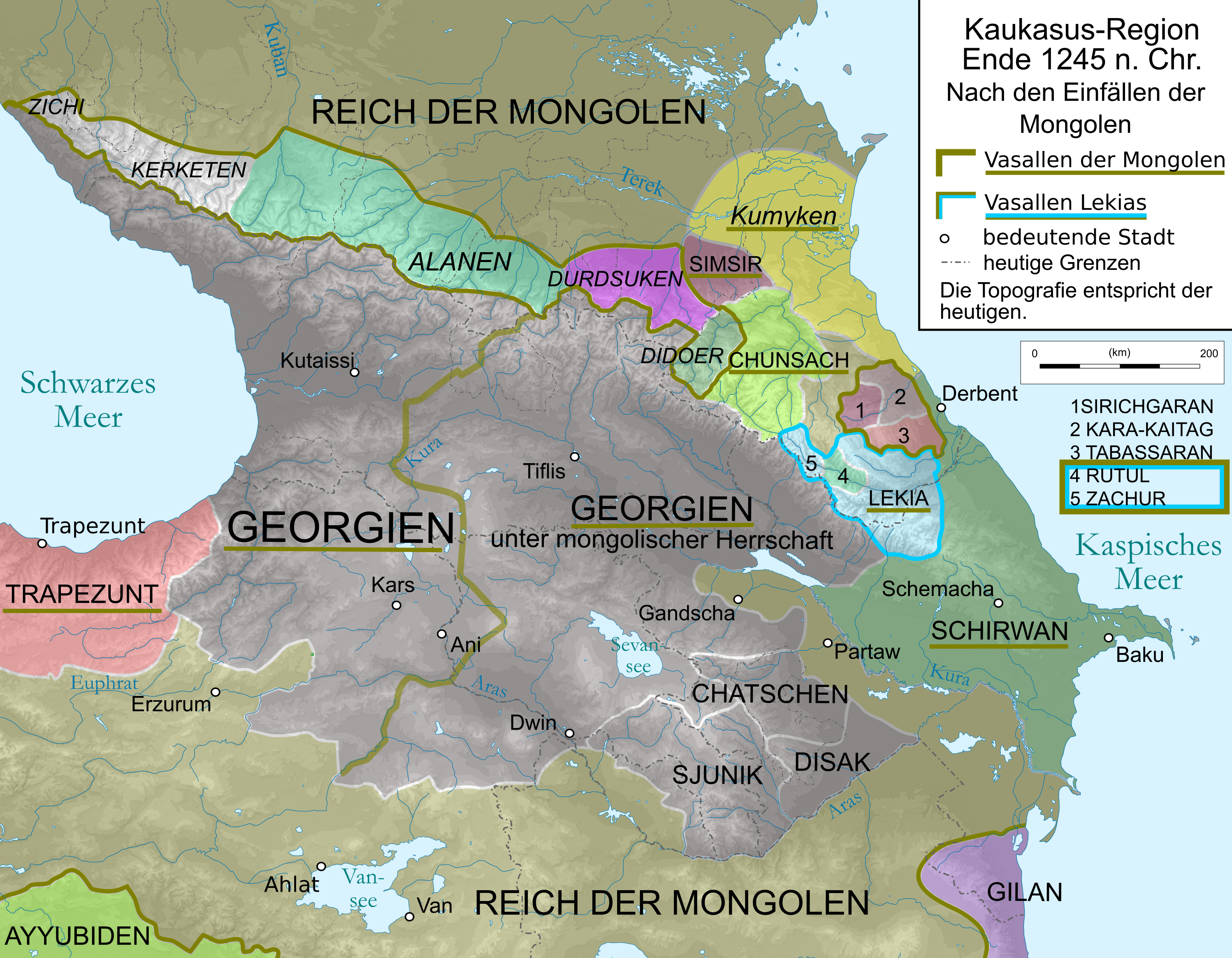
Caucasus 1245

Tat (variants of names - Caucasian Iranians, Tat, Parsi, Daghly, Lahij) - are Iranian-speaking people who live in Azerbaijan and Russia (in the south of the Republic of Dagestan). They profess Islam - Shiite and Sunni directions. The Sunni Tats mainly live in the Guba, Siyazan and Shabran regions of Azerbaijan and also in Dagestan (Russia) they inhabit villages to the west of the city of Derbent. Also, the Tats live in Georgia - Gombori (Sagarejoi municipality).

The Tats live in Absheron and call themselves Parsi, and the Tats in the mountain villages of the northeast are called Daghly. Residents of the village of Lahij in the Ismailli region use another name. They refer to themselves as Lahij.

== Etymology ==
The name of tats first appeared in the 8th century. The ethnonym "Tat" has changed its meaning several times over the centuries. In the early era, the name tats is found in the monumental inscriptions of the ancient Persian kings of the Achaemenid dynasty (the time of the mention of the inscription is about the 5th century BC). The word "tat" meant one of the ancient Iranian tribes". It is also worth noting that the Christian population in the mountainous regions of the Crimea were also called tat, but spoke Greek.

== Background ==
The history of the Tats is not fully understood and there are very few facts about their origin. There are several versions of historians about the origin of the Tats. Some historians are inclined to believe about their Scythian origin, calling their ancestors in the person of ancient tapurs. Others speak of their Sassanian origin. There are versions about their Jewish origin and their assimilation of the Massagetae.

== Middle Ages ==
The Tats were the main population of the Shirvanshah state.

== Ethnogenesis ==
The Tat ethnogenesis was formed due to the mixing of Iranian, Caucasian and Semitic peoples. The Massagetae unambiguously participated in the etogenesis of the Tats, tribes of Caucasian Albania and Arab-Turkic conquerors.

== Writing system ==
Until the October Revolution, the Tats used Persian as a written language, a small part of them spoke Arabic. In subsequent years, the Tat language remained unwritten.

== Census of tat ==
According to the 1921 census, there were more than 100 thousand tats. In 1931, 60.5 thousand tats were marked, and in 1989 their number dropped to 10 thousand, in 1999 only 10.9 thousand people called themselves tatami. The Tats are one of the small peoples of Azerbaijan, who are most susceptible to assimilation processes. This is noticeable among urban Muslim Tats. All this complicates the implementation of the actual number of tats. M. Velili-Baharly claims that the majority of the Azeri-Turks of north-western Azerbaijan, as well as the mountainous region of the Quba and Shemakhi districts, as well as the Absheron peninsula, consists of turkicized tats.

== Flag of tat ==
The flag of tat was created in 2012.

== Khorasan and Turkmen tats ==
In the Middle Ages, the name tat was found on the territory of present-day Turkmenistan and in Khorasan.

== Tats in Georgia ==
Despite the fact that during the Soviet period in the Soviet Union, including Georgia, the ethnic situation was scrupulously described, one ethnic group escaped the field of view of both scientists and state structures. These are lajjs (lakhijs), which were designated (registered) as Azerbaijanis both in the population censuses and in official legal documents proving the identity. Attention should be paid to one more circumstance: the people under such an ethnonym are not attested anywhere.

The Laijs live in Gare Kakheti (Eastern Georgia), in the village of Gombori, Sagarejo region. Although the Laijs were recorded as Azerbaijanis, they did not consider themselves to be such. Along with Laij ethnic consciousness, they have such a basic feature of ethnicity as language. Since this ethnic unit was not known to the general scientific community until today, from now on, such awareness of the scientific community is necessary. The priority of detecting Laijah belongs to the Georgian orientalist (Iranian) scientist Manana Kvachadze, who scientifically studied the Laij language, playing the role of a kind of pioneer in this matter (Kvachadze 1988; 1989; 1998; 2004). The author of the article was familiar from childhood with the original ethnic community of the Laijs, with which he was even linked by certain family ties. What language do the Laijs speak? - In tat language. But it should certainly be emphasized that layjs do not identify themselves with the tatami. And one more interesting circumstance: in the village of Gombori, there is also another group of Muslims who call themselves tat, but speak Azeri rather than Tati. They are also recorded in all documents - both Soviet times and the current ones - as Azerbaijanis. These two ethnic groups of the Islamic faith communicate with each other in Azerbaijani.

According to the materials we obtained, in 2010 there were between 300 and 400 Laijis living in Georgia. For various reasons, it is impossible to determine their exact number. The Laij are people of Iranian / Tato-speaking origin, and the Tats still live in Azerbaijan and Iran (in the Zohra and Talikan regions), as well as in Dagestan. According to linguistic data, Laidzh language is included in the southwestern group of Iranian languages and is one of the dialects of the Tat language. The Laij speech reveals a close genetic link with the Persian and Tajik languages .
