= Xəndək, Siazan =

Xəndək
- Location within Azerbaijan
- Coordinates: 40°58′35″N 48°59′41″E
- Country: Azerbaijan
- Rayon: Siazan
- Time zone: UTC+4 (AZT)
  - Summer (DST): UTC+5 (AZT)

Xəndək (also, Khandag and Khandek) is a village in the Siazan Rayon of Azerbaijan.
