= Qalaaltı =

Coordinates: 41°05′N 48°57′E

Qalaaltı is a village in the municipality of Məşrif Qala alti in the Shabran Rayon of Azerbaijan.
