= Besh Barmag Mountain =

Mountain in Azerbaijan

Besh Barmag
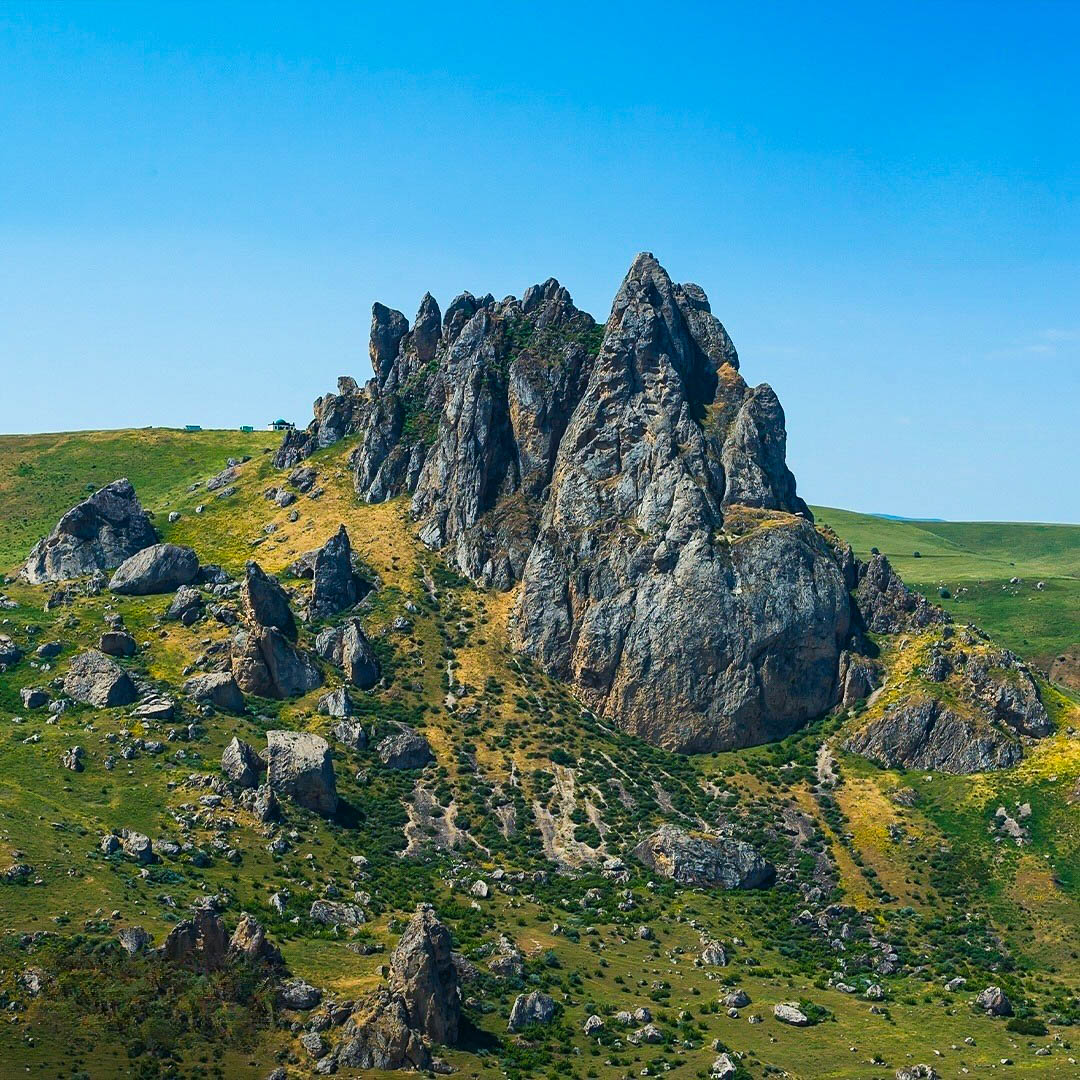
- Besh Barmag Mountain in northeastern Azerbaijan

Highest point
- Elevation: 382 m (1,253 ft)
- Coordinates: 40.9307°N 49.2356°E

Naming
- Native name: Beş Barmaq (Azerbaijani)

Geography
- Location within Caucasus Mountains
- Location: Azerbaijan

Besh Barmag (Azerbaijani: Beşbarmaq) literally translated as Five Fingers, is in Siazan District of Azerbaijan, not far from the Caspian Sea, in the territory of Qalaşıxı village.

It rises to 382 m (1,253 ft) above the sea level overlooking the Baku-Quba Highway. The mountain is a solid rock and is one of the most famous mountains in the Caucasus, known for its mythical stories. It is a sacred place for regular visitation by pilgrims.

Tide marks on the mount attest to meltwater inundation from the northern glacial ice caps and date back to the end of the last ice age. The tidelines confirm the theory of a Holocene outflow of meltwater from the Black Sea to the Mediterranean Sea, rather than a direct incursion of sea water into the Black Sea as a result of global sea level rise. Estimates of the increase in Caspian Sea level height are between + 20 and 30 meters.

== See also ==
- Pir Khidir Zinda
