= Dağ Quşçu =

Dagh Gushchu
- Municipality
- Azerbaijani: Dağ Quşçu
- Location within Azerbaijan
- Coordinates: 41°00′25″N 48°58′20″E
- Country: Azerbaijan
- District: Siazan

Population
  - Total: 539
- Time zone: UTC+4 (AZT)
  - Summer (DST): UTC+5 (AZT)

Dağ Quşçu (also, Dagh Gushchu) is a village and municipality in the Siazan District of Azerbaijan. It has a population of 539. The municipality consists of the villages of Dagh Gushchu and Əlməkolu.
