= Qaragöz, Siazan =

Garagoz
- Azerbaijani: Qaragöz
- Location within Azerbaijan
- Coordinates: 40°57′N 48°59′E
- Country: Azerbaijan
- District: Siazan
- Municipality: Yuxarı Ələz
- Time zone: UTC+4 (AZT)
  - Summer (DST): UTC+5 (AZT)

Qaragöz (also, Garagoz) is a village in the Siazan District of Azerbaijan. The village forms part of the municipality of Yuxarı Ələz.
