= Çarxana, Siazan =

Çarxana
- Location within Azerbaijan
- Coordinates: 41°02′45″N 49°03′09″E
- Country: Azerbaijan
- Rayon: Siazan
- Municipality: Sədan
- Time zone: UTC+4 (AZT)
  - Summer (DST): UTC+5 (AZT)

Çarxana (also, Charkhana and Charkhany) is a village in the Siazan Rayon of Azerbaijan. The village forms part of the municipality of Sədan.
