= Qalaşıxı =

- Location within Azerbaijan
- Coordinates: 40°57′55″N 49°14′20″E
- Country: Azerbaijan
- Rayon: Siazan
- Municipality: Zarat
- Time zone: UTC+4 (AZT)
  - Summer (DST): UTC+5 (AZT)

Qalaşıxı (also, Kalashykhy) is a village in the Siazan Rayon of Azerbaijan. It forms part of the municipality of Zarat.
