= Pir Khidir Zinda =

Mausoleum in Azerbaijan

- Azerbaijani: Xıdır Zində piri
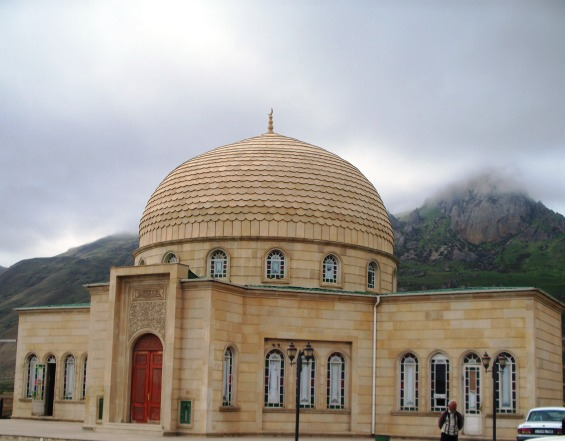
- The mausoleum in 2009
- Interactive map of Pir Khidir Zinda
- Location: Beşbarmaq, Siyazan rayon, Azerbaijan
- Coordinates: 40°57′20″N 49°13′56″E
- Type: Mausoleum
- Dedicated to: Khidir

The Pir Khidir Zinda (Azerbaijani: Xıdır Zində piri), also called Khidir Zunja and Beshbarmag-piri, is a mausoleum, pilgrimage site, and sacred place for Muslims, located on the slopes of Beşbarmaq rock, in the Siyazan rayon of Azerbaijan.

The mausoleum site is located within the “Beshbarmag Mountain” State Historical Cultural and Nature Reserve, proclaimed in 2020.

The mausoleum and pilgrimage site becomes especially crowded in summer. It is appropriate and compulsory to wash hands with holy water flowing from mountain springs prior to approaching the mausoleum.

== History ==
The site is considered to be the meeting place of the prophets Moses and Khidir.

For drivers and passengers going from Baku to the northern districts of Azerbaijan, including to Siyazan, Quba, Qusar, Khachmaz and Nabran, and to Russia along the Baku-Rostov highway, the nearby village of Beshbarmag is often the first destination, with a fuel station and resting place located in the village. In the village there are shops, cafés and restaurants, located near the white-stone mosque, several hundred meters below the Pir Khidir Zinda mausoleum.

=== Legends about Khizir ===
According to one of widely spread legends, Khidir served in the army of Alexander the Great and helped the great commander to find a spring of fresh water in the outskirts of Beshbarmag Mountain. (Note: According to another version, it is in Middle Asia.)

== Gallery ==
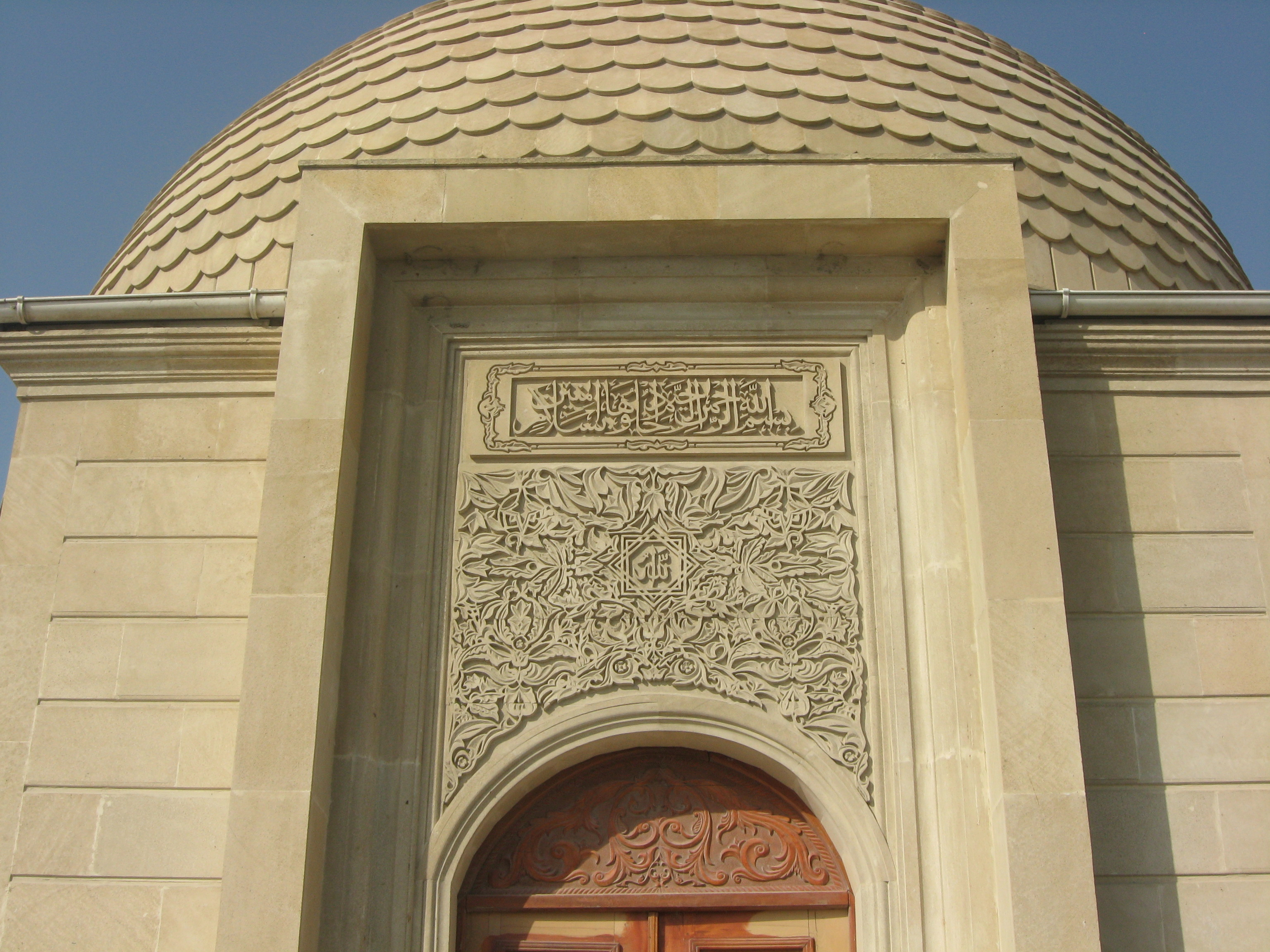
An inscription on the door of the mausoleum

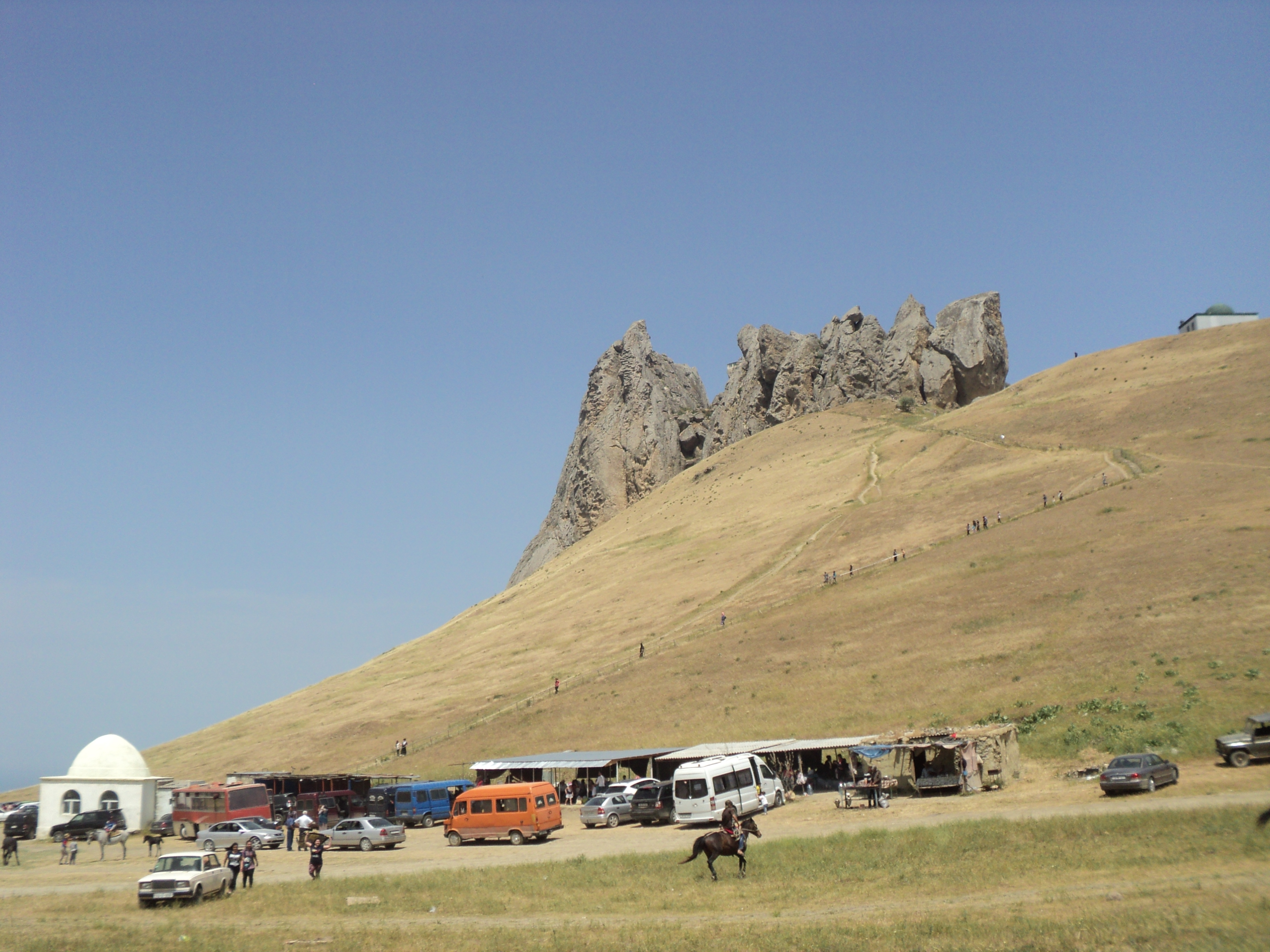
The mausoleum dome in 2014, top right of the image, relative to Beşbarmaq, with part of the village in the foreground

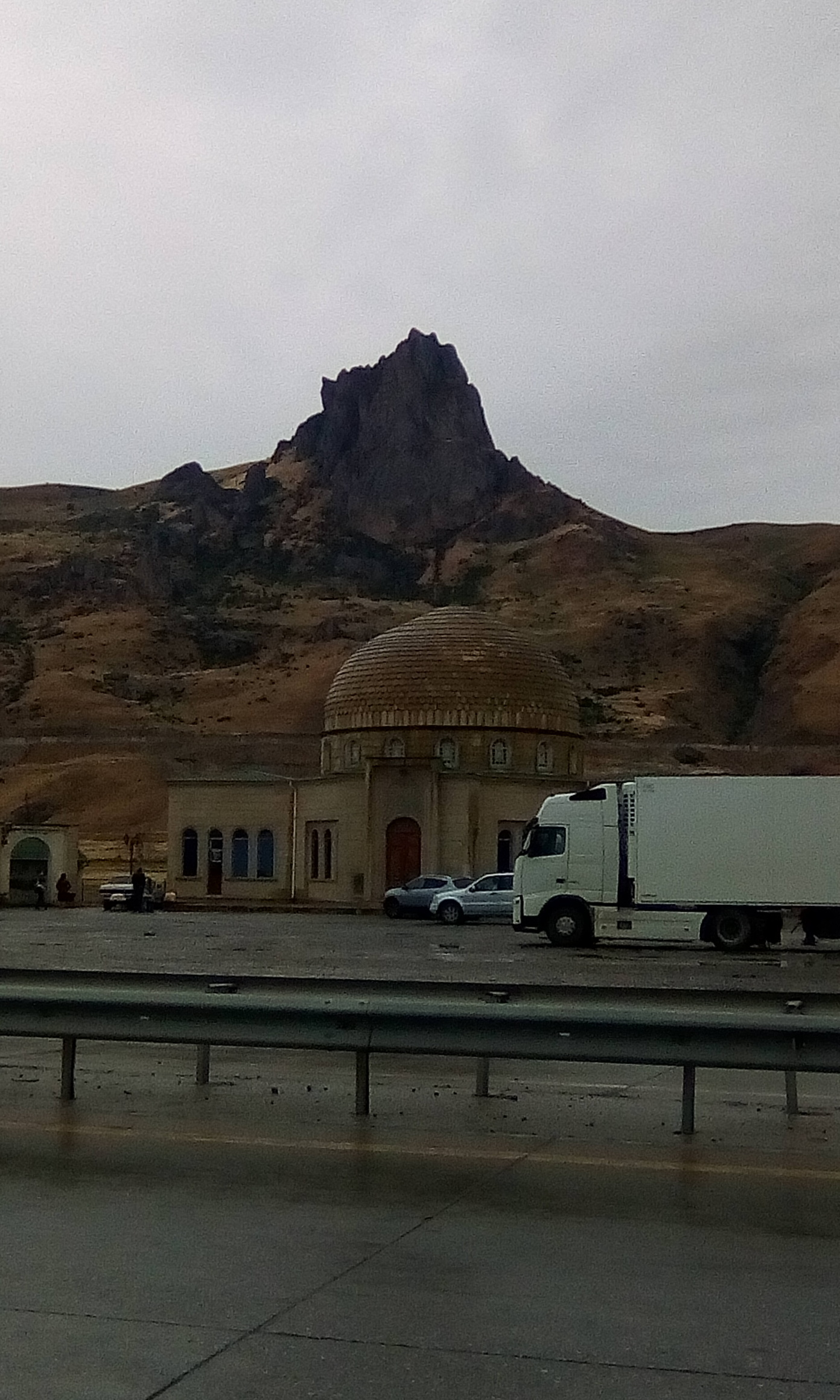
The mausoleum relative to Beşbarmaq in 2018

== See also ==
- Besh Barmag Mountain
- List of mausoleums in Azerbaijan
