= Yanıq Ələz =

- Location within Azerbaijan
- Coordinates: 40°57′23″N 48°59′10″E
- Country: Azerbaijan
- Rayon: Siazan
- Municipality: Yuxarı Ələz
- Time zone: UTC+4 (AZT)
  - Summer (DST): UTC+5 (AZT)

Yanıq Ələz (also, Yanıq Alayaz, Yanıqələz, Ashaga Alyaz, and Yanykhalayaz) is a village in the Siazan Rayon of Azerbaijan. The village forms part of the municipality of Yuxarı Ələz.
