= Hişgədərə, Siazan =

Hişgədərə
- Location within Azerbaijan
- Coordinates: 40°58′25″N 49°09′24″E
- Country: Azerbaijan
- Rayon: Siazan
- Time zone: UTC+4 (AZT)
  - Summer (DST): UTC+5 (AZT)

Hişgədərə (also, Keshkedar and Khyshkadar) is a village in the Siazan Rayon of Azerbaijan.
