= Nardaran, Siazan =

Nardaran
- Location within Azerbaijan
- Coordinates: 41°00′48″N 49°08′28″E
- Country: Azerbaijan
- Rayon: Siazan
- Municipality: Beşdam
- Time zone: UTC+4 (AZT)
  - Summer (DST): UTC+5 (AZT)

Nardaran is a village in the Siazan Rayon of Azerbaijan. The village forms part of the municipality of Beşdam.
