= Yuxarı Ələz =

- Municipality
- Location within Azerbaijan
- Coordinates: 40°57′45″N 48°57′54″E
- Country: Azerbaijan
- Rayon: Siazan

Population
  - Total: 350
- Time zone: UTC+4 (AZT)
  - Summer (DST): UTC+5 (AZT)

Yuxarı Ələz (also, Yuxarı-ələz, Yuxarı Alayaz, Yukharu-Alyaz, Yukhary Alayaz, and Yukhary Alyaz) is a village and the least populous municipality in the Siazan Rayon of Azerbaijan. It has a population of 350. The municipality consists of the villages of Yuxarı Ələz, Yanıq Ələz, Ərziküş, Qaragöz, Köhnə Quşçu, Günəvşa, and Hacışəkər.
