= Tat alphabet =

One of several writing systems used for the Tat language

The Tat alphabet is used for writing in the Tat language, which has two main dialects - the northern one, spoken by Mountain Jews, and the southern one, spoken by the Tats. During its existence, the Tat writing functioned primarily in the northern dialect and at the same time changed its graphic basis several times and was reformed several times. Currently, the writing of the Mountain Jews is in Cyrillic alphabets, and the writing of the Muslim Tats is in the Latin alphabet. There are four stages in the history of Tat writing:

- 1870s - 1928 - writing based on Hebrew alphabet.
- 1928-1938 - writing based on the Latin alphabet.
- Since 1938 - writing based on the Cyrillic alphabet.
- Since the beginning of the 1990s, there have been attempts to create a written language on a Latin basis in Azerbaijan.

== Muslim Tat language ==
Until 1928, the Arabic script was used. Subsequently, the Muslim Tat language became practically unwritten. Before the annexation of Transcaucasia to the Russian Empire, the Tats used only Farsi as a written language; even the spoken dialect of the Muslim Tats had and still has this name in Absheron. Writing based on the Azerbaijani Latin alphabet is used rarely and sporadically.

== Hebrew alphabet ==
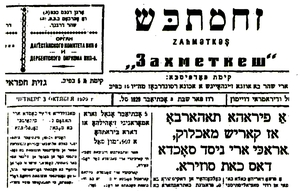
Mountain Jewish newspaper The Toiler (Judeo-Tat: Захметкеш) in Hebrew alphabet

The first records of Judeo-Tat writing date back to the late 1870s and early 1880s, when Rabbi Yaakov Yitzhaki compiled the first Tat book, “Thesaurus of Judeo-Tat (Juhuri) language of the Mountain Jews of the Caucasus.” This book used Hebrew writing, adapted to the needs of Tat phonetics. At the beginning of the 20th century, the Tat script on a Jewish graphic basis became more widely used - books began to be published in it, and in 1915 an attempt was made to publish a newspaper. In 1921, the first primer New School (Judeo-Tat: Таза школа) was published in this alphabet. In 1927, at the All-Union Conference on cultural work among the Mountain Jews, held in Moscow, it was decided to reflect in writing all the vowel sounds of the Judeo-Tat dialect (א [æ], אַ [a], אָ [о], י [i], ו [v], וּ [u]). However, at that time the process of transitioning the Tat language to the Latin script was beginning, which made the reform irrelevant.

The Judeo-Tat alphabet based on the Hebrew script looked like this:

א	אַ	אִ	אָ	אי	או	אוּ	בּ	ב	ג	ד	ה	ז	'ז	ח
י	כּ	כ	ל	מ	נ	ס	ע	פּ	פ	'צ	ק	ר	ש	ת

== Soviet Latin alphabet ==
In the 1920s, the process of romanization of scripts was underway in the USSR. In May 1925, Y. Agarunov compiled the first draft of a Latinized alphabet for Mountain Jews. On May 15–20, 1926, at the regional congress of Mountain Jews in Nalchik, it was decided to transfer the Tat writing system to a Latin graphic basis. Since that time, preparatory work on Latinization began in the North Caucasus and Azerbaijan. In 1928, several projects for a new script were submitted to the committee for a new alphabet for consideration. Thus, the project of Z. Yu. Khudainatov included the following letters: А a, B в, V v, G g, D d, H h, Z z, Ӡ ӡ, ħ, I i, J j, K k, X x, L ʟ, M m, N n, S s, Y y, P p, F f, C c, Ç ç, ꜧ, R r, Ş ş, T t, O o, U u, Ú ú, E e.

On April 28–30, 1929, the All-Union Conference of representatives of the Mountain Jewish people were held in Baku. It finally approved the new alphabet for the Judeo-Tat language proposed by Boris Miller. It looked like this:

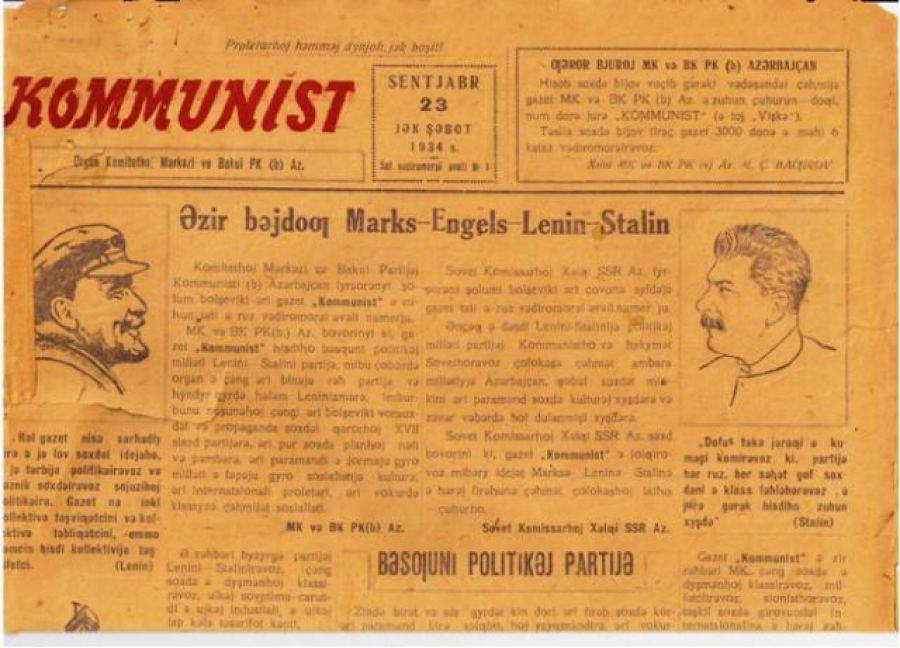
Mountain-Jewish newspaper “Communist” in the Latin alphabet (1934)

A a	B b	C c	Ç ç	D d	Đ đ	E e	Ə ə
F f	G g	Ƣ ƣ	H h	ħ	Ⱨ ⱨ	I i	J j
K k	L l	M m	N n	O o	P p	R r	S s
Ş ş	T t	U u	V v	X x	Y y	Z z

This alphabet was actively used in the field of education, book publishing and the media. In 1932, the first standard grammar of the Tat language was published.

In later editions in Latin, the letter Đ đ is absent, but is present (only in borrowings) E e

== Cyrillic alphabets ==
The question of the transition of the Judeo-Tat language to the Cyrillic alphabet was raised in 1937. The Presidium of the Supreme Council of the Dagestan Autonomous Soviet Socialist Republic instructed the Institute for the Study of National Cultures of Dagestan to develop this version of the letter. A new version of the alphabet was published on February 15, 1938, in the newspaper Dagestankaya Pravda; on July 1, all periodicals were translated into it, and on September 1, teaching the Cyrillic alphabet began in schools. Later, some changes were made to the alphabet (the letter Дж дж was excluded. The letter УӀ уӀ was replaced by Уь уь, and ХӀ хӀ by Хь хь). As a result, the alphabet began to look like this:

А а	Б б	В в	Г г	Гъ гъ	Гь гь	ГI гI	Д д
Е е	Ё ё	Ж ж	З з	И и	Й й	К к	Л л
М м	Н н	О о	П п	Р р	С с	Т т	У у
Уь уь	Ф ф	Х х	Хь хь	Ц ц	Ч ч	Ш ш	Щ щ
Ъ ъ	Ы ы	Ь ь	Э э	Ю ю	Я я

In the Azerbaijan SSR in 1938, the Judeo-Tat language was removed from all official spheres of activity - the publication of books, newspapers, and teaching in schools was stopped. Therefore, the alphabet adopted in the Dagestan Autonomous Soviet Socialist Republic was not used in Azerbaijan. However, instead of it, a separate version of the Tat Cyrillic writing spontaneously arose, which was closer to the Cyrillic version of the Azerbaijani alphabet. At the end of the 20th - beginning of the 21st century, it also found some use among the Mountain Jewish who emigrated to Israel А а, Б б, В в, Г г, Д д, Е е, Ҹ ҹ, З з, И и, Й й, К к, Ҝ ҝ, Л л, М м, Н н, О о, П п, Р р, С с, Т т, Һ һ, Ћ ћ, Ԧ ԧ, У у, Ф ф, Х х, Ч ч, Ш ш, Ә ә, Ү ү. There are other versions of this alphabet, differing in the order of the letters and the replacement of the letter И й with Ј ј, as well as the presence of additional letters ӱ, ы.

== Modern Latin alphabet in Azerbaijan ==
In the 1990s, an alphabet based on Latin was created for the Muslim Tats of Azerbaijan. Several textbooks have been published on it: A a, B b, C c, Ç ç, D d, E e, Ә ə, F f, G g, Ğ ğ, H h, X x, I ı, İ i, J j, K k, Q q, L l, M m, N n, O o, Ö ö, P p, R r, S s, Ş ş, T t, U u, Ü ü, V v, Y y, Z z.

Several scientific publications and dictionaries of the Judeo-Tat language of Azerbaijan sometimes use another version of the Latin alphabet: A a, B b, C c, Ç ç, D d, E e, Ә ə, F f, G g, Q q, H h, ħ, Ⱨ ⱨ, İ i, I ı, J j, K k, L l, M m, N n, O o, P p, R r, S s, Ş ş, T t, U u, Ü ü, V v, Y y, X x, Z z.

== Alphabets correspondence table ==
Hebrew alphabet	Latin 1930s	Cyrillic (Dagestan)	Cyrillic (Azerbaijan)	Latin (Azerbaijan)
אַ	A a	А а	А а	A a
בּ	B b	Б б	Б б	B b
'צ	C c	Ч ч	Ч ч	Ç ç
'ז	Ç ç	Ж ж	Ҹ ҹ	C c
ד	D d	Д д	Д д	D d
אי	E e	Е е	Е е	E e
א	Ə ə	Е е, Э э	Ə ə	Ə ə
פ	F f	Ф ф	Ф ф	F f
ג	G g	Г г	Г г	G g
ק	Ƣ ƣ	Гъ гъ	Ғ ғ	Ğ ğ
ה	H h	Гь гь	Һ h	H h
ח	ħ	Хь хь	Ћ ћ	—
ע	Ⱨ ⱨ	ГI гI	Ԧ ԧ	—
אִ	I i	И и	И и	İ i
י	J j	Й й	Ј ј	Y y
כּ	K k	К к	К к	K k
ל	L l	Л л	Л л	L l
מ	M m	М м	М м	M m
נ	N n	Н н	Н н	N n
אָ	O o	О о	О о	O o
פּ	P p	П п	П п	P p
ר	R r	Р р	Р р	R r
ס	S s	С с	С с	S s
ש	Ş ş	Ш ш	Ш ш	Ş ş
ת	T t	Т т	Т т	T t
אוּ	U u	У у	У у	U u
ב	V v	В в	В в	V v
וֹ	Y y	Уь уь	Үү	Ü ü
כ	X x	Х х	Х х	X x
ז	Z z	З з	З з	Z z
-	-	Ё ё	-	-
-	-	Ц ц	-	-
-	-	Щ щ	-	-
-	-	Ъ ъ	-	-
-	-	Ь ь	-	-
-	-	Ю ю	-	-
-	-	Я я	-	-
