= Çarxana, Qabala =

Çarxana
- Municipality
- Location within Azerbaijan Location within Shaki-Zagatala Economic Region
- Coordinates: 40°50′23″N 47°41′20″E
- Country: Azerbaijan
- Rayon: Qabala

Population
  - Total: 754
- Time zone: UTC+4 (AZT)
  - Summer (DST): UTC+5 (AZT)

Çarxana (also, Charkhana) is a village and municipality in the Qabala Rayon of Azerbaijan. It has a population of 754.
