= Allahyarlı, Masally =

Village and municipality in Azerbaijan

Coordinates: 39°1′0.80″N 48°36′54.54″E

Allahyarlı is a village and municipality in the Masally Rayon of Azerbaijan. It has a population of 256.
