= Allahyarlı, Beylagan =

Allahyarlı is a village and municipality in the Beylagan Rayon of Azerbaijan. It has a population of 671.
