= Qaragöz, Zangilan =

Qaragöz
- Location within Azerbaijan
- Coordinates: 39°01′23″N 46°39′13″E
- Country: Azerbaijan
- Rayon: Zangilan
- Time zone: UTC+4 (AZT)
  - Summer (DST): UTC+5 (AZT)

Qaragöz (also, Karagëz and Kara-kez) is a village in the Zangilan Rayon of Azerbaijan.
