= Nardaran, Gobustan =

Nardaran
- Municipality
- Location within Azerbaijan
- Coordinates: 40°23′38″N 49°02′54″E
- Country: Azerbaijan
- Rayon: Gobustan

Population
  - Total: 196
- Time zone: UTC+4 (AZT)
  - Summer (DST): UTC+5 (AZT)

Nardaran (also, Nardəran and Nardayan) is a village and the least populous municipality in the Gobustan Rayon of Azerbaijan. It has a population of 196.
