= Hişgədərə, Masally =

Hişgədərə
- Municipality
- Location within Azerbaijan
- Coordinates: 38°54′37″N 48°42′07″E
- Country: Azerbaijan
- Rayon: Masally

Population
  - Total: 2,536
- Time zone: UTC+4 (AZT)
  - Summer (DST): UTC+5 (AZT)

Hişgədərə kendi (also, Hişkədərə, Khashka-Dara, Qurudere) is a village and municipality in the Masally District, Azerbaijan. It has a population of 2,536.
