= Qonaqkənd, Shamakhi =

Qonaqkənd
- Municipality
- Location within Azerbaijan
- Coordinates: 40°41′31″N 48°42′32″E
- Country: Azerbaijan
- Rayon: Shamakhi

Population
  - Total: 835
- Time zone: UTC+4 (AZT)
  - Summer (DST): UTC+5 (AZT)

Qonaqkənd (also, Konagkend, Konakhkend, and Konakkend) is a village and municipality in the Shamakhi Rayon of Azerbaijan. It has a population of 835.
