= Tat people (Caucasus) =

Iranian ethnic group in Azerbaijan and Russia

- Ethnic flag

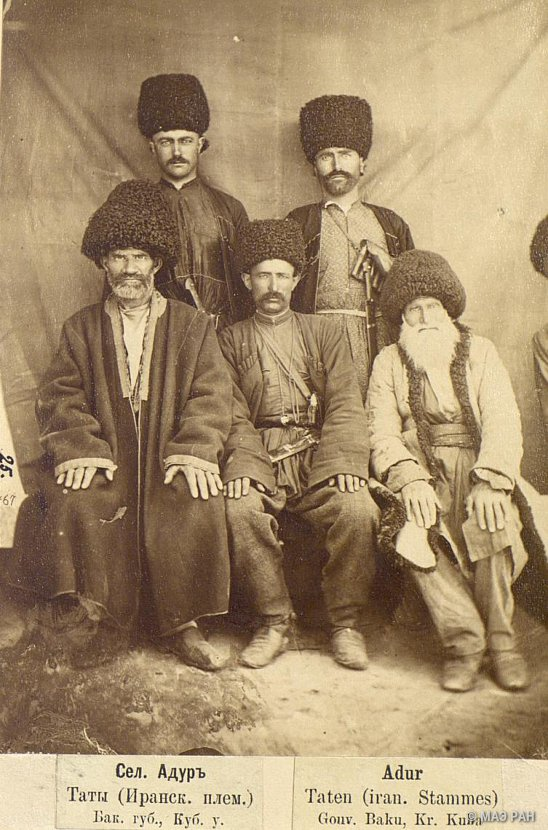
- 1880 photograph depicting a group of Tat men from the village of Adur in the Kuba Uyezd of the Baku Governorate of the Russian Empire

Total population
- tens of thousands (various estimates)

Regions with significant populations
- Azerbaijan: 27,700 (2019)
- Russia: 575 (2021)

Languages
- Tat, Azerbaijani, and Russian

Religion
- Majority Shia Islam, minority Sunni Islam

Related ethnic groups
- Persians, other Iranian peoples, Armeno-Tats

The Tat people or Transcaucasian Persians (also: Tat, Parsi, Daghli, Lohijon) are an Iranian people presently living within Azerbaijan and Russia (mainly Southern Dagestan). The Tats are part of the indigenous peoples of Iranian origin in the Caucasus.

Tats use the Tat language, a southwestern Iranian language somewhat different from standard Persian, as well as Azerbaijani and Russian. Tats are mainly Shia Muslims with a significant Sunni Muslim minority.

== Demographics ==
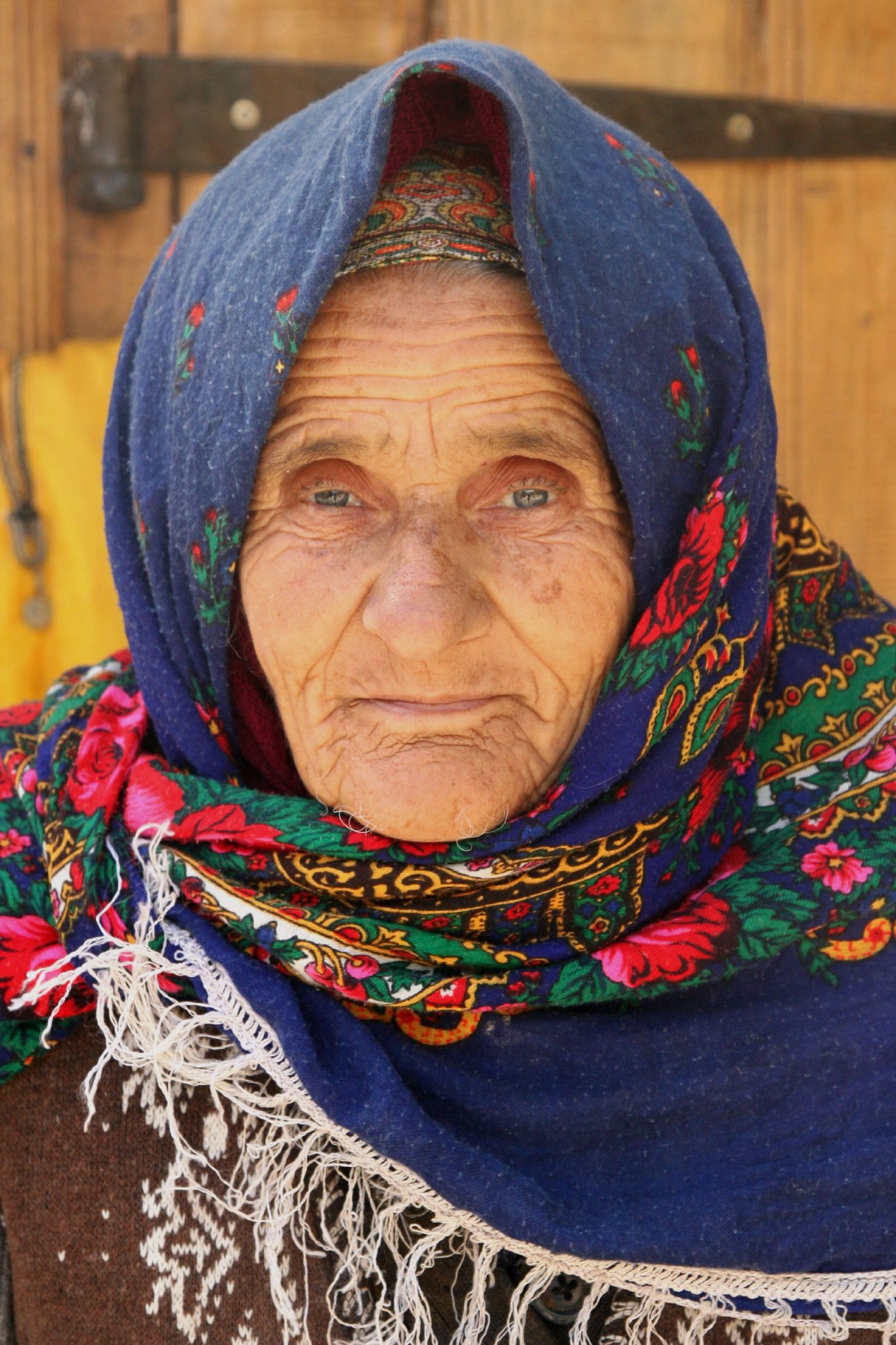
An old Tat woman in Lahic

As late as the turn of the 20th century, the Tat constituted about 11% of the population of the entire eastern half of Azerbaijan (see Baku Governorate, the section on Demography). They formed nearly one-fifth (18.9%) of the population of the Baku province and over one-quarter (25.3%) of the Kuba Province—both on the Caspian Sea. Either through misrepresentation, data manipulation, or simple assimilation, the Tat portion of the population of Azerbaijan has shrunk to insignificance, facing assimilation.

The 1886–1892 Tsarist population figures counted 124,683 Tats in the Russian Caucasus of which 118,165 were located in the Baku Governorate and 3,609 in the Dagestan Oblast. The 1897 Russian Empire census recorded 95,056 Tats, of which 89,519 were in the Baku Governorate and 2,998 in the Dagestan Oblast. The 1926 Soviet census only counted 28,705 Tats of which 28,443 were in the Azerbaijan SSR and 1,237 in the Dagestan ASSR. Arthur Tsutsiev notes that a major portion of Tats in the 1926 census were listed under the categories "Persians" and "Azerbaijani Turks". This was particularly the case within the Azerbaijan SSR, where some 38,327 individuals were recorded as "Turks whose native language is Tat". The 1979 Soviet census counted 22,441 Tats of which 8,848 were located in the Azerbaijan SSR and 7,437 in the Dagestan ASSR.

== History ==
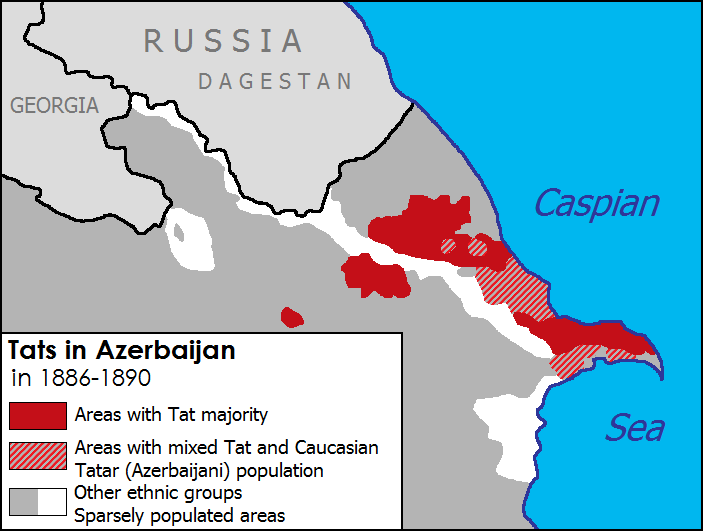
Distribution of the Tats in Azerbaijan (then Baku Governorate, part of the Russian Empire) in 1886–1890.

The earliest mention of Persians in the Caucasus is found in the Greek historian Herodotus' account of the Achaemenid expansion of 558–330 BC, during which they annexed Transcaucasia (South Caucasus) as the X, XI, XVIII and XIX satrapies of their empire.

Archaeological material uncovered in present-day Azerbaijan, Armenia and Georgia include Achaemenid architecture, jewelry and ceramics.

There is little information about the permanent Persian population in South Caucasus since the Achaemenid period. Likely the ancestors of modern Tats settled in South Caucasus when the Sassanid Empire from the 3rd to 7th centuries built cities and founded military garrisons to strengthen their positions in this region.

Khosrow I (531–579) presented the title of regent of Shirvan in eastern South Caucasus to a close relative of his, who later became a progenitor of the first Shirvanshah dynasty (about 510 – 1538).

After the region had been conquered by Arabs in the 7th and 8th centuries, the Islamization of the local population began.

In the 11th century, Oghuz tribes led by the Seljuq dynasty started to penetrate into the region. The gradual formation of the Azeribaijani people started. Apparently, in this period the Turkic exonym Tat or Tati, which designated settled farmers, was assigned to the South Caucasian dialect of the Persian language.

The Mongols conquered South Caucasus in the 1230s and the Ilkhanate state was founded in the 1250s. Mongol domination lasted until 1360–1370, but did not prevent prominent poets and scientists from emerging.

At the end of the 14th century, the South Caucasus was invaded by Tamerlane. By the end of the 15th century, the state of Shirvanshahs had obtained considerable power, its diplomatic and economic ties had become stronger. In the middle of the 16th century the state of Shirvanshahs was eliminated and the South Caucasus joined Safavid Iran almost completely.

In the late 18th century Russia actively started to contest the hegemony of Iran in the Caucasus. Following the Russo-Persian Wars of 1804-1813 and 1826-1828 and the respectively resulting treaties of Gulistan and Turkmenchay, Russia gained most of the South Caucasus and parts of the North Caucasus from Qajar Iran. After that there is data about quantity and settling of the Tats, collected by tsarist authorities. When the city of Baku was occupied in the beginning of the 19th century during the Russo-Persian War (1804–1813), the whole population of the city (about 8,000 people) were Tats.

Russia more or less openly pursued a policy to free their newly conquered land from Iran's influence. By doing this, the Russian government helped to create and spread a new Turkic identity that, in contrast to the previous one, was founded on secular principles, particularly the shared language. As a result, many Iranian-speaking residents of the future Azerbaijan Republic at the time either started hiding their Iranian ancestry or underwent progressive assimilation. The Tats and Kurds underwent these integration processes particularly quickly.

According to the 19th-century Golestan-e-Eram, written by Abbasqulu Bakikhanov, Tati was widespread in many areas of Shamakhi, Baku, Darband and Guba:

“There are eight villages in Tabarsaran which are: Jalqan, Rukan, Maqatir, Kamakh, Ridiyan, Homeydi, Mata'i, and Bilhadi. They are in the environs of a city that Anushiravan built near the wall of Darband. Its remains are still there. They speak the Tat language, which is one of the languages of Old Persia. It is clear that they are from the people of Fars and after its destruction, they settled in those villages. ..The districts situated between the two cities of Shamakhi and Qodyal, which is now the city of Qobbeh, include Howz, Lahej, and Qoshunlu in Shirvan and Barmak, Sheshpareh and the lower part of Boduq in Qobbeh, and all the country of Baku, except six villages of Turkmen, speak Tat. it becomes apparent from this that they originate from Fars.“

— Abbas Qoli Aqa Bakikhanov, "The Heavenly Rose-Garden: A History of Shirvan & Daghestan"

According to the 1894 publication of the Caucasian Calendar, there were 124,693 Tats in the Caucasus.

In 2005 American researchers carried out investigations in several villages of Guba, Devechi, Khizi, Siyazan, Ismailli and Shemakha districts of the Republic of Azerbaijan, indicating 15,553 Tats in these villages.

== Local self-designations ==
Although the majority of the Tat population of Azerbaijan and southern Dagestan uses the Turkic exonym Tati or Tat as a self-designation, there remain some local self-designations:

- Parsi—The term Parsi has been used until the present day by the Tats of Absheron as self-designation and zuvan Parsi as an indication of Tat language. This term relates to Pārsīk, the Middle Persian self-designation of Persians, cf. Middle Persian Pārsīk ut Pahlavīk – Persian and Parthian. During the New Persian language period the final consonant was lost and the ethnonym became Pārsī. Some groups of Persian-speaking populations in Afghanistan and the Zoroastrians of India (the Parsis) also use the term Parsi as a self-designation.
- Lohijon—The citizens of the Tat settlement Lahij in the Ismailli district name themselves after their village Lohuj, plural Lohijon. Lahij is the largest Tat village (about 10.000). Its isolation has prevented the local population from contacts with the outside world which has led to their own isolated self-designation. A small community of the Lohijon, descendants of the 1910–20s migrants from Lahij, live in the village of Gombori in Kakheti, in the east of Georgia. They are registered as Azerbaijanis and speak Azerbaijani as their primary language. As of 2020, there are only about 150 them left.
- Daghli—The Tats in Khizi district and parts of Devechi and Siyazan districts use another Turkic exonym, Daghli (mountaineers) for themselves. As a result of the spread of Azeri Turkic the term Daghli has strongly come into use and the local Tats started to use it themselves.

On December 14, 1990, the Azeri cultural and educational society for studying and development of Tati language, history, and ethnography was founded by the board of the Ministry of Justice of the Azerbaijan SSR. A primer and textbook of the Tat language together with literary and folklore pieces were published.

== Culture ==
The Persians of the South Caucasus have long interacted with the surrounding ethnic groups, exchanging elements of their cultures. Arts like carpet-making, hand-weaving, metal manufacture, embossing and incrustation are highly developed. The arts of ornamental design and miniature are also very popular.

There is a rich tradition of Tat spoken folk art. Genres of national poetry like ruba’is, ghazals, bayts are highly developed. While studying the works of Persian medieval poets of South Caucasus like Khaqani and Nizami Ganjavi some distinctive features of the Tat language have been revealed.

As a result of the long co-existence of Tats and Azerbaijanis, many common features in farming, housekeeping, and culture have developed. Traditional Tat female clothes are a long shirt, wide trousers worn outside, a slim line dress, outer unbuttoned dress, headscarf, and "Moroccan" stockings. Male clothes are the Circassian coat and high fur-cap.

=== Farming ===
Traditional occupations of the Tat population are agriculture, vegetable-growing, gardening and cattle-breeding. The main cultures are barley, rye, wheat, millet, sunflower, maize, potatoes and peas. Large vineyards and fruit gardens are widespread. Sheep, cows, horses, donkeys, buffalos and rarely camels are kept as domestic cattle.

The traditional one or two-storeyed houses made of rectangular limestone blocks or river shingles and also have blank walls facing the street. The roof is flat with an opening for a stone fireplace chimney. The upper floor is used for habitation and living areas where the family gets together (kitchen etc.) were situated on the ground floor. Typically one of the living room walls has several niches for the storage of clothes, bed linens, and sometimes crockery. Rooms were illuminated by lamps or by a skylight through an opening in the roof. House furniture consisted of low couches, carpeted floors, and mattresses. Fireplaces, braziers, and ovens were used for heating the home in winter and cooking year-round.

The property usually has a walled or fenced in yard and almost always has a garden. There is a veranda (eyvan), a paved drain or a small basin (tənu), covered cattle-pan, stable and hen-house.

=== Religion ===
Originally the Persians were Zoroastrian. After they had been conquered by the Rashidun Caliphate, Islam became widespread. Today the Tats are mainly Shia Muslim, with a sizeable minority who are Sunni Muslim.

== Other Tat-speaking ethnic groups ==
The Tat language was widely spread in the eastern portion of the South Caucasus. Up to the 20th century it was also used by non-Muslim groups: Mountain Jews, part of the Armenians (Armeno-Tats) and the Udins. This has led some to the idea that Muslim Tats, Tat-speaking Mountain Jews, and Tat-speaking Christian Armenians are one nation, practicing three different religions.

=== Tats and Mountain Jews ===
The "Mountain Jews" belong to the community of Persian-speaking Jews. Some groups of this community live in Iran, Israel (especially), North America (especially), and Europe. The Jews of North Caucasus and modern day Azerbaijan were classified "Mountain Jews" only in 19th-century official Russian documentation. The Mountain Jews call themselves Juhuro, which means "Jews".

In the year 1888 A. Sh. Anisimov showed the closeness of the language of the Mountain Jews and the Tats. In his work Caucasian Jews-Mountaineers he came to the conclusion that the Mountain Jews were representatives of the Iranian family of the Tats, which had adopted Judaism in Iran and later moved to the South Caucasus. The ideas of Anisimov were supported during the Soviet period: the popularization of the idea of the Mountain Jews' Tat origin started in the 1930s. Through the efforts of several Mountain Jews, closely connected with the regime, the idea of mountain Jews being not really Jews at all but Judaized Tats became widely spread. Some Mountain Jews started to register themselves as Tats because of secret pressure from the authorities.

As a result of this, the words Tat and Mountain Jew became almost synonymous. The term "Tat" was used in research literature as the second or even first name for Mountain Jews. This caused the whole cultural heritage (literature, theatre, music) created by Mountain Jews during the Soviet period to be attributed to the Tats.

Comparing physic-anthropological characteristics of Tats and Mountain Jews together with information about their languages suggests no signs of ethnic unity between these two nations.

Like most "Jewish" languages, the grammatical structure of Juhuri retains archaic features of the language it is derived from. At the same time all of these languages are satiated with Hebrew words. The loanwords from Aramaic and Hebrew in Juhuri include words not directly connected with Judaic rituals (e.g. zoft resin, nokumi envy, ghuf body, keton linen, etc.) Some syntactical features that Juhuri has are ones typical for Hebrew.

The physical-anthropological types of Tats and Mountain Jews are also dissimilar.

In 1913 the anthropologist K.M. Kurdov carried out measurements of a large group of Tat population of Lahij village and revealed fundamental differences of their physical-anthropological type from the Mountain Jews. Measurements of Tats and Mountain Jews were also made by some other researchers. Cephalic index measurements have shown that, while for Tats mesocephalia and dolichocephalia are typical, extreme brachycephalia is typical for Mountain Jews. Dermatoglyphic characteristics of the Tats and Mountain Jews also exclude ethnic similarity. In 2012 a uniparental genetic markers comparison between Judeo-Tat dialect and Muslim-Tat dialect speakers in Dagestan found independent demographic histories.

Speakers of Mountain-Jew dialect and Tati language are representatives of two different nations, each with its own religion, ethnic consciousness, self-designation, way of life, material and spiritual values.

=== Tats and Armenians ===
Some 19th- and 20th-century publications describe the citizens of several Tat-speaking villages of the South Caucasus as Armenian Tats, Armeno-Tats, Christian Tats or Gregorian Tats. It was suggested that a part of the Persians of the South Caucasus had adopted Armenian Christianity, but this did not take into consideration the fact that those citizens identify themselves as Armenians, because conversion to religion is strongly attached to ethnic identity in eastern cultures.

There are traces of an Armenian phonological, lexical, grammatical, and calque substratum in the dialect of Tat-speaking Armenians. There are also Armenian affricates (ծ, ց, ձ) in words of Iranian origin, which do not exist in the Tat language. This can only be explained by Armenian influence.

Although they have lost their language these Armenians managed to preserve their national identity. It has a distinct "us versus them" dichotomy, "Hay" (us) to "Muslims" (Tats and Azeri together).

== Tat people of northern Iran ==
Starting from the Middle Ages, the term Tati was used not only for the Caucasus but also for northern Iran, where it was extended to almost all of the local Iranian languages except Persian and Kurdish.

Currently the term Tati and Tati language is used to refer to a particular group of north-western Iranian dialects (Chali, Danesfani, Hiaraji, Hoznini, Esfarvarini, Takestani, Sagzabadi, Ebrahimabadi, Eshtehardi, Hoini, Kajali, Shahroudi, Harzani) in Iranian Azerbaijan, as well as south of it in the provinces of Qazvin and Zanjan. These dialects have a certain affinity to the Talysh language as one of the descendants of the Old Azari language.

== See also ==
- Tat alphabet
- Tati language (Iran)
- History of Tat people

== Sources ==
- Ter-Abrahamian, Hrant (2005). "On the Formation of the National Identity of the Talishis in Azerbaijan Republic". Iran and the Caucasus. 9 (1). Brill: 121–144. doi:10.1163/1573384054068132.
- Tonoyan, Artyom (2019). "On the Caucasian Persian (Tat) Lexical Substratum in the Baku Dialect of Azerbaijani. Preliminary Notes". Zeitschrift der Deutschen Morgenländischen Gesellschaft. 169 (2): 367–378. doi:10.13173/zeitdeutmorggese.169.2.0367. S2CID 211660063.
