= Siyazan District =

District in northeastern Azerbaijan

Coordinates: 40°59′N 49°11′E

- District
- Map of Azerbaijan showing Siyazan District
- Country: Azerbaijan
- Economic regions of Azerbaijan: Guba-Khachmaz
- Region: Europe
- Established: 2 April 1992
- Capital: Siyazan
- Settlements: 34

Government
  - Governor: Novruz Novruzov

Area
  - Total: 700 km^{2} (270 sq mi)

Population (2020)
  - Total: 42,600
  - Density: 61/km^{2} (160/sq mi)
- Time zone: UTC+4 (AZT)
- Postal code: 5300
- Website: www.siyezen-ih.gov.az

Siyazan District (Azerbaijani: Siyəzən rayonu) is one of the 66 districts of Azerbaijan. It is located in the northeast of the country and belongs to the Guba-Khachmaz Economic Region. The district borders the districts of Shabran, Khizi, and the exclaves of Quba. Its capital and largest city is Siyazan. As of 2020, the district had a population of 42,600.

== Etymology ==
The name is believed to be derived from Persian, meaning "White Women", a reference to the original inhabitants, Tats. Another theory links the name with the Persian word siyah, meaning "black".

== History ==
The villages of Agh Siyazan ("White Siyazan") and Gara Siyazan ("Black Siyazan") formerly existed in the territory of the Siyazan District, and the city was formerly called Gizilburun (Azerbaijani: Qızılburun). When the Baku-Shollar Pipeline was being constructed between 1911 and 1916, people started moving in from the surrounding villages as a labour force. The "Gizilburun" railway station also played a role in the transformation of these places into residential areas.

Between 1938 and 1939, geologists discovered oil deposits in the Siyazan District. Subsequently, the first oil wells were drilled in the area, which attracted more people to move into the district.

The Siyazan District was part of the Absheron District until 11 February 1939, when it was combined with the neighboring Khizi and Siyazan as a single district. Gizilburun, later renamed Siyazan in 1954, was its center. However, in 1959 it was abolished and merged into the Shabran District. The district was re-established on 2 April 1992 by the order of Supreme Soviet of Azerbaijan.

== Geography ==
The district is located in the northeastern part of Azerbaijan, in the Samur-Davachi lowland, on the shore of the Caspian Sea near the Greater Caucasus. It is geographically located in Europe. The mountain ridge crosses the western part of the lowland, extending along the Caspian Sea. Its latitude is 28 metres (92 ft). The well-known mountain of Besh Barmag is located in the district with an altitude of 500 metres (1,600 ft). Geological structure and sedimentation detected in the territory of the district are dated to the Paleogene and Neogene periods.

The surface of the lowland's southwestern part makes up a semi-desert landscape. Meadow and forest landscapes are typical for its mountainous parts, where grey meadow and chestnut-brown soils spread. The Atachay and Gilgilchay Rivers flowing through the territory of the district spring from mountainous parts. Snow and rain swell the rivers.

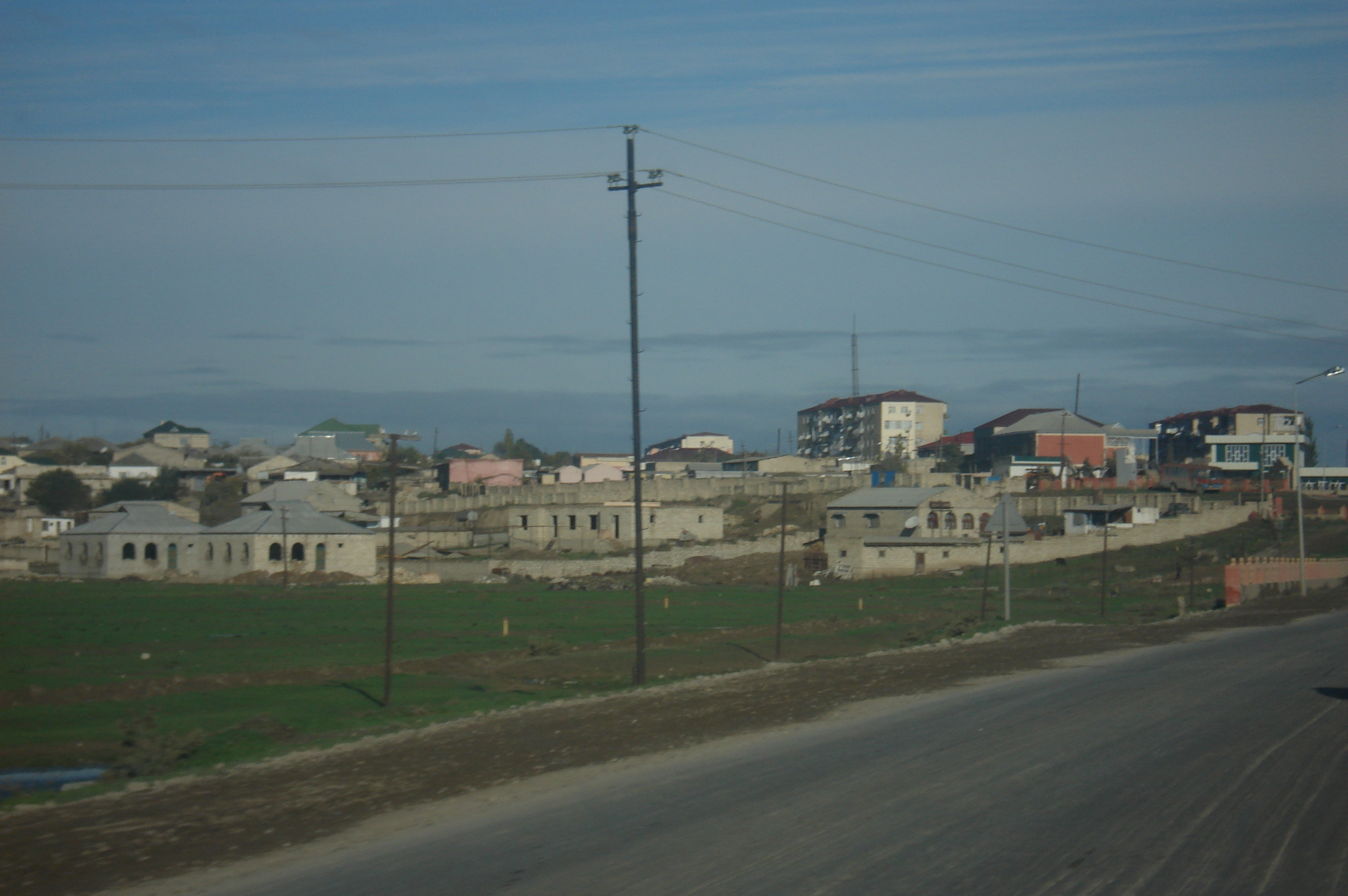
Siyazan District

The climate in the district is moderately warm and dry subtropical. The average temperature is from 1.5 °C to 4 °C in January, up to 15 °C and 25 °C respectively in July. Summer is dry. The annual rainfall is 300–650 mm. The lands are mainly gray-brown soils.

== Demographics ==
The population of the Siyazan district was 40,500, according to a January 2015 statistic. The rural population (33.39%) is relatively small compared to the urban population (65.61%), according to an April 2009 census. Out of the total population, 49.8% are men and 50.2% are women. The ethnic majority in the district are Azerbaijanis according to the 2009 census. However, minorities such as Lezgins, Russians, Turks, Tatars, Ukrainians also live in the region.

== Economy ==
=== Industry ===
Siyazan is an industrial district. The main natural resources are oil, natural gas, sand, gravel, clay. The mining industry prevails in the economy.

There are 4 large and medium, and 8 small industrial enterprises, two flour mills owned by individual entrepreneurs, bakery shops, furniture shops, and plastic goods production shops in the area of the district.

In 2016, products worth AZN 11121.2 thousand were produced. 61.3% of the total volume of industrial production belongs to state ownership, 38.3% to private property, and 0.4% to private entrepreneurs producing industrial products.

In 2016, natural gas pipes and pipes were produced, and 52.1 thousand tons of oil, 10.1 million cubic meters of gas were sold. In 2016, the average number of workers in the industry was 1250, and the average wage was 678.4 manat.

=== Agriculture ===
38.11 hectares of land in 70,300 hectares are agricultural land, including 8,900 hectares of sown area. Grain and livestock farming dominate in agriculture. There are 6 agricultural enterprises, including Siyazan-Broiler, a large poultry farm, and 56 individual entrepreneurships.

In 2016, in the region, agricultural products were produced in the amount of 72184,8 thousand manats. 5.8% of the production was made by plants, and 94.2% by the hygiene products.

In 2016 the region harvested 6083.0 tons of grain, 195.1 tons of corn, 358.0 tons of potatoes, 1148.0 tons of vegetables, 1002.0 tons of melons, 1202 tons of fruits, and 242 tons of grapes. 100 hectares of nuts, and 18 hectares of olives have been planted.

In early 2017, the number of cattle in the region was 13,024, and the number of sheep and goats was 54,375. 19066.9 tons of meat, including 16924.9 tons of poultry, 12287 tons of milk, 12.3 million eggs, and 89 tons of wool were produced in live weight.

== Culture and education ==
There are six secondary schools, and a sports school. A music school and a boarding school in the city of Siyazan. In the center of Siyazan district is the central hospital, diagnostic center (regional), central polyclinic, and children's hospital operate.

== Cultural heritage ==
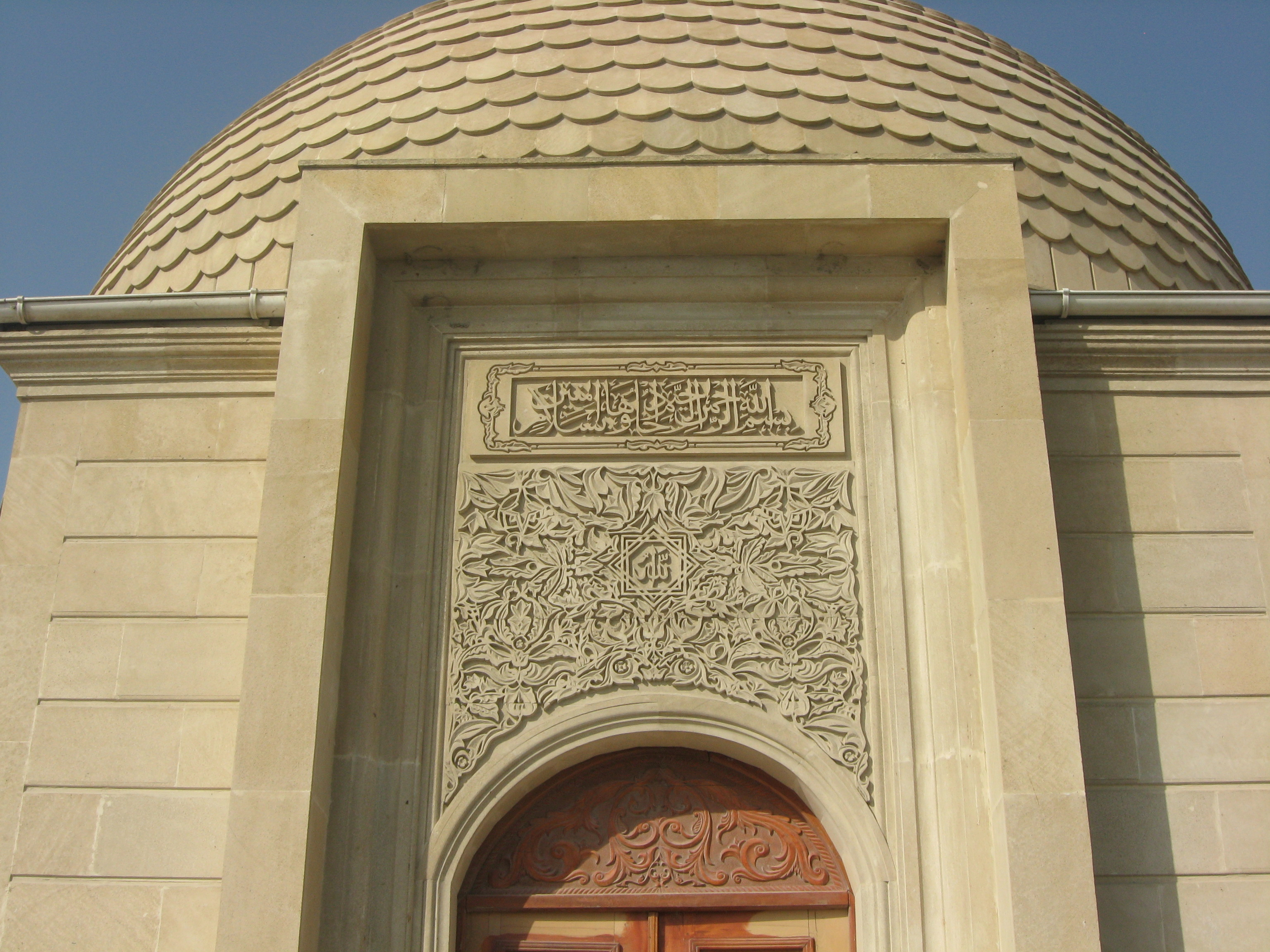
Hidir Zinja Mausoleum

The following items are listed as cultural heritage items:

- Flexible parabolic barrier (4th-7th centuries) - This fortification extends from the skirts of Beshbarmak to the Caspian Sea.
- Gil-gilchay defense fortress complex (5th century) - is surrounded by the Chirag Fortress, passing through Yenikend, Kolani, Eynibulag, Dashli Calghan, Gala-six villages of Siyazan district.
- Pir Khalil Mausoleum (18th century) is located at the base of Beshbarmaq, in the Gil-Gilchay settlement. Until the present time, he survived.
- The remains of the castle - Religious tower belonging to the Middle Ages
- The Sheikh Heydar Tomb (15th century) is located in the village cemetery in the west of the ancient Shikhlar village.
- Remains of Caravanserai (15th-17th centuries) - is located on the right side of the Baku-Devechi highway, 87 km away from Baku

The town (medieval) is located in the northern part of Siyazan city:

- Waterfall - located near the village of Zarat
- Stone cave- located in village of Dib
- Gil-Gilchay railway station (1898)
- Zarat railway station (1913)
- Water Pipeline (1906) is located near the city of Siyazan.
- Golubbur railway station was constructed in 1913
- An ancient water reservoir was constructed in 1913 and is located near the Gizilburun station.

=== Memorial monuments ===
- Statue of Jafar Jabbarli
- Statue of Mikayil Mushviq
- "1941-1945" Monument Complex
- "20 January" Monument Complex
- "Neftchi Martyrs" Monument Complex

== Bibliography ==
- Everett-Heath, John (2018). "Siyäzän". The Concise Dictionary of World Place-Names (4 ed.). Oxford University Press. ISBN 978-0191866326.
