= Qəhrəmanlı =

Qəhrəmanlı or Kagramanli may refer to:

- Kagramanly, Azerbaijan
- Kəhrəmanlı, Azerbaijan
- Qəhrəmanlı, Barda, Azerbaijan
- Qəhrəmanlı, Beylagan, Azerbaijan
