= Aliyarli =

Aliyarli is a surname. Notable people with the surname include:

- Dilshad Aliyarli
- Suleyman Aliyarli
