= Persians =

Iranian ethnic group

مردم فارس
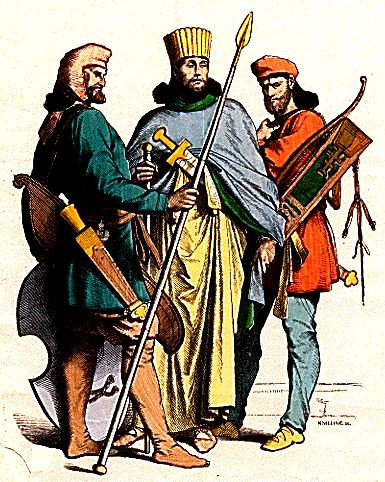
- Persian noblemen and soldiers, c. 1861–1880

Total population
- c. 52–68 million

Regions with significant populations
- Iran: 51,940,000 (Note: Between 51% and 65% of the country's total population, including Gilaks and Mazanderanis.)–67,980,000 (Note: includes 58.3 million Persians, 4.84 million Mazandaranis & 4.84 million Gilaks)

Languages
- Persian

Religion
- Majority: Shia Islam (Twelver); Minority: Zoroastrianism, Christianity, Baháʼí Faith, Sunni Islam, and various others

Related ethnic groups
- Other Southwestern Iranian peoples, Tajiks, Tat people (Caucasus), Achomi people, Basseri, Parsis, Lurs, Aimaq people, Dehwar, Ajam of Bahrain, 'Ajam of Kuwait

Persians, (Note: /ˈpɜːrʒənz/ PUR-zhənz; less commonly: /ˈpɜːrʃənz/ PUR-shənz) or Persian people, (Note: Persian: مردم فارس, romanized: Mardom-e Fārs or Pārsī) are an Iranian ethnic group indigenous to the Iranian plateau that comprise the majority of the population of modern-day Iran. They have a common cultural system and are native speakers of the Persian language. In the Western world, "Persian" was largely understood as a demonym for all Iranians rather than as an ethnonym for the Persian people, but this understanding shifted in the 20th century.

The Persians are descended from ancient Iranian peoples who migrated to Persis (also called "Persia proper" and corresponding with Iran's Fars Province) by the 9th century BC. Although Persians, Kurds, and other Iranian tribes originally migrated from Central Asia to Iran in the second millennium BCE, genetic evidence suggests that modern Iranians are mostly descended from the ancient indigenous populations of the Iranian Plateau, rather than being primarily descended from only Central Asian migrants, depending on the ethnic group. Alongside the various ethnicities and cultures that they were contemporaries with, they established and ruled some of the world's most powerful empires, which are widely recognized for their massive cultural, political, and social influence in the ancient Near East and beyond. Persians have contributed greatly to art and science, and Persian literature is one of the world's most prominent literary traditions both inside and outside of Iran. The regional prestige of their civilization was the basis for the development of many noteworthy Persianate societies, especially among the Turkic peoples, throughout Central Asia and South Asia.

In contemporary terminology, Persian-speaking people from Afghanistan, Tajikistan, and Uzbekistan are known as Tajiks, with the former two countries having mutually intelligible Persian varieties called Dari and Tajiki, respectively; whereas those from the Caucasus (primarily in the Republic of Azerbaijan and in Dagestan, Russia), albeit heavily assimilated, are known as Tats. Historically, however, the terms Tajik and Tat were used synonymously and interchangeably with Persian. Many influential Persian figures hailed from outside of Iran's modern borders—to the northeast in Afghanistan and Central Asia, and, to a lesser extent, to the northwest in the Caucasus proper.

Additionally, several Persian dynasties ruled Greater Iran from outside of modern-Iran's borders. The Samanid Empire, whose founder Saman Khuda hailed from Balkh, ruled much of Greater Iran from Bukhara (present-day Uzbekistan). The Saffarid dynasty governed much of Greater Iran from Zaranj (present-day Afghanistan), and the Ghurid dynasty ruled parts of Greater Iran from Firozkoh (present-day Afghanistan). The former two dynasties contributed significantly to the restoration of the Persian language and identity following the Arab conquest of Persia, with arguably the most important outcome being the Samanid patronage behind the composition of the Shahnameh.

== Ethnonym ==
=== Etymology ===
The term Persian, meaning "from Persia", derives from Latin Persia, itself deriving from Greek Persís (Περσίς), a Hellenized form of Old Persian Pārsa (𐎱𐎠𐎼𐎿), which evolves into Fārs (فارس) in modern Persian. In the Bible, particularly in the books of Daniel, Esther, Ezra, and Nehemya, it is given as Pārās (פָּרָס).

A Greek folk etymology connected the name to Perseus, a legendary character in Greek mythology. Herodotus recounts this story, devising a foreign son, Perses, from whom the Persians took the name. Apparently, the Persians themselves knew the story, as Xerxes I tried to use it to suborn the Argives during his invasion of Greece, but ultimately failed to do so.

=== History of usage ===
Although Persis (Persia proper) was only one of the provinces of ancient Iran, varieties of this term (e.g., Persia) were adopted through Greek sources and used as an exonym for all of the Persian Empire for many years. Thus, especially in the Western world, the names Persia and Persian came to refer to all of Iran and its subjects.

Some medieval and early modern Islamic sources also used cognates of the term Persian to refer to various Iranian peoples and languages, including the speakers of Khwarazmian, Mazanderani, and Old Azeri. 10th-century Iraqi historian Al-Masudi refers to Pahlavi, Dari, and Azari as dialects of the Persian language. In 1333, medieval Moroccan traveler and scholar Ibn Battuta referred to the Afghans of Kabul as a specific sub-tribe of the Persians. Lady Mary (Leonora Woulfe) Sheil, in her observation of Iran during the Qajar era, states that the Kurds and the Leks would consider themselves as belonging to the race of the "old Persians".

On 21 March 1935, the king of Iran Reza Shah of the Pahlavi dynasty issued a decree asking the international community to use the term Iran, the native name of the country, in formal correspondences, instead of Persia which had been previously used. However, the term Persian is still historically used to designate the predominant population of the Iranian peoples living in the Iranian cultural continent.

== History ==
Persia is first attested in Assyrian sources from the third millennium BC in the Old Assyrian form Parahše, meaning "Land of the horses" designating a region belonging to the Sumerians. The name of this region was adopted by a nomadic ancient Iranian people who migrated to the region in the west and southwest of Lake Urmia, eventually becoming known as "the Persians". The ninth-century BC Neo-Assyrian inscription of the Black Obelisk of Shalmaneser III, found at Nimrud, gives it in the Late Assyrian forms Parsua and Parsumaš as a region and a people located in the Zagros Mountains, the latter likely having migrated southward and transferred the name of the region with them to what would become Persis (Persia proper, i.e., modern-day Fars), and that is considered to be the earliest attestation to the ancient Persian people.

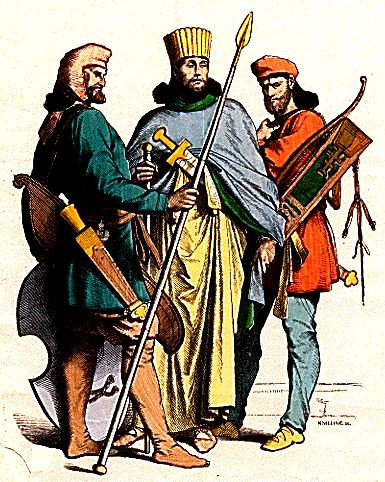
Ancient Persian attire worn by soldiers and a nobleman. The History of Costume by Braun & Scheider (1861–1880)

The ancient Persians played a major role in the downfall of the Neo-Assyrian Empire. The Medes, another group of ancient Iranian people, unified the region under an empire centered in Media, which would become the region's leading cultural and political power of the time by 612 BC. Meanwhile, under the dynasty of the Achaemenids, the Persians formed a vassal state to the central Median power. In 552 BC, the Achaemenid Persians revolted against the Median monarchy, leading to the victory of Cyrus the Great over the throne in 550 BC. The Persians spread their influence to the rest of what is considered to be the Iranian Plateau, and assimilated with the indigenous groups of the region, including the Elamites and the Mannaeans.

Map of the Achaemenid Empire at its greatest extent

At its greatest extent, the Achaemenid Empire stretched from parts of Eastern Europe in the west to the Indus Valley in the east, making it the largest empire the world had yet seen. The Achaemenids developed the infrastructure to support their growing influence, including the establishment of the cities of Pasargadae and Persepolis. The empire extended as far as the limits of the Greek city states in modern-day mainland Greece, where the Persians and Athenians influenced each other in what is essentially a reciprocal cultural exchange. Its legacy and impact on the kingdom of Macedon was also notably huge, even for centuries after the withdrawal of the Persians from Europe following the Greco-Persian Wars.

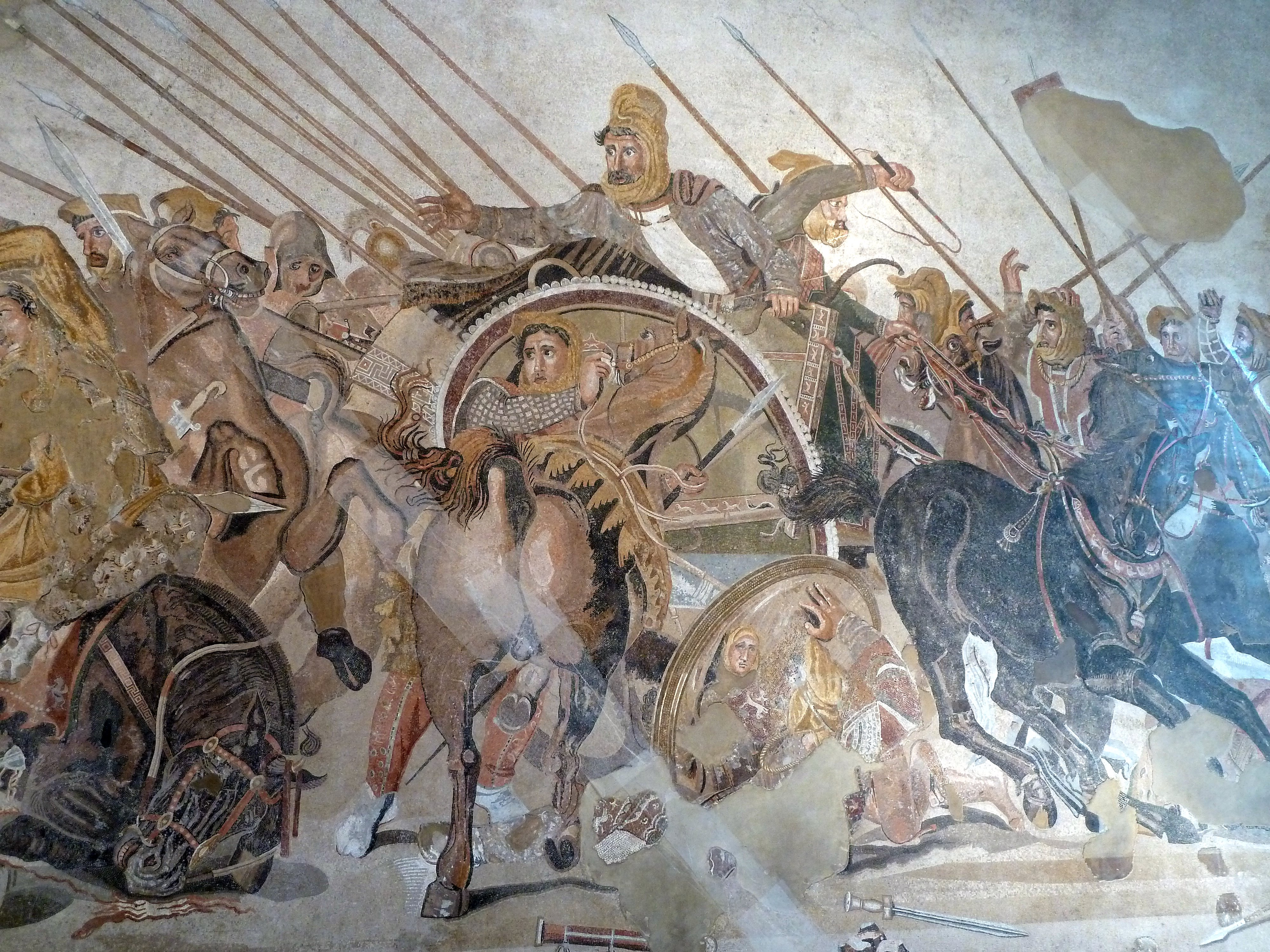
Persian warriors led by Darius III in the antique Alexander Mosaic

During the Achaemenid era, Persian colonists settled in Asia Minor. In Lydia (the most important Achaemenid satrapy), near Sardis, there was the Hyrcanian plain, which, according to Strabo, got its name from the Persian settlers that were moved from Hyrcania. Similarly near Sardis, there was the plain of Cyrus, which further signified the presence of numerous Persian settlements in the area. In all these centuries, Lydia and Pontus were reportedly the chief centers for the worship of the Persian gods in Asia Minor. According to Pausanias, as late as the second century AD, one could witness rituals which resembled the Persian fire ceremony at the towns of Hyrocaesareia and Hypaepa. Mithridates III of Cius, a Persian nobleman and part of the Persian ruling elite of the town of Cius, founded the Kingdom of Pontus in his later life, in northern Asia Minor. At the peak of its power, under the infamous Mithridates VI the Great, the Kingdom of Pontus also controlled Colchis, Cappadocia, Bithynia, the Greek colonies of the Tauric Chersonesos, and for a brief time the Roman province of Asia. After a long struggle with Rome in the Mithridatic Wars, Pontus was defeated; part of it was incorporated into the Roman Republic as the province of Bithynia and Pontus, and the eastern half survived as a client kingdom.

Following the Macedonian conquests, the Persian colonists in Cappadocia and the rest of Asia Minor were cut off from their co-religionists in Iran proper, but they continued to practice the Iranian faith of their forefathers. Strabo, who observed them in the Cappadocian Kingdom in the first century BC, records (XV.3.15) that these "fire kindlers" possessed many "holy places of the Persian Gods", as well as fire temples. Strabo, who wrote during the time of Augustus (r. 27 BC – AD 14), almost three hundred years after the fall of the Achaemenid Persian Empire, records only traces of Persians in western Asia Minor; however, he considered Cappadocia "almost a living part of Persia".

The Iranian dominance collapsed in 330 BC following the conquest of the Achaemenid Empire by Alexander the Great, but reemerged shortly after through the establishment of the Parthian Empire in 247 BC, which was founded by a group of ancient Iranian people rising from Parthia. Until the Parthian era, Iranian identity had an ethnic, linguistic, and religious value. However, it did not yet have a political import. The Parthian language, which was used as an official language of the Parthian Empire, left influences on Persian, as well as on the neighboring Armenian language.

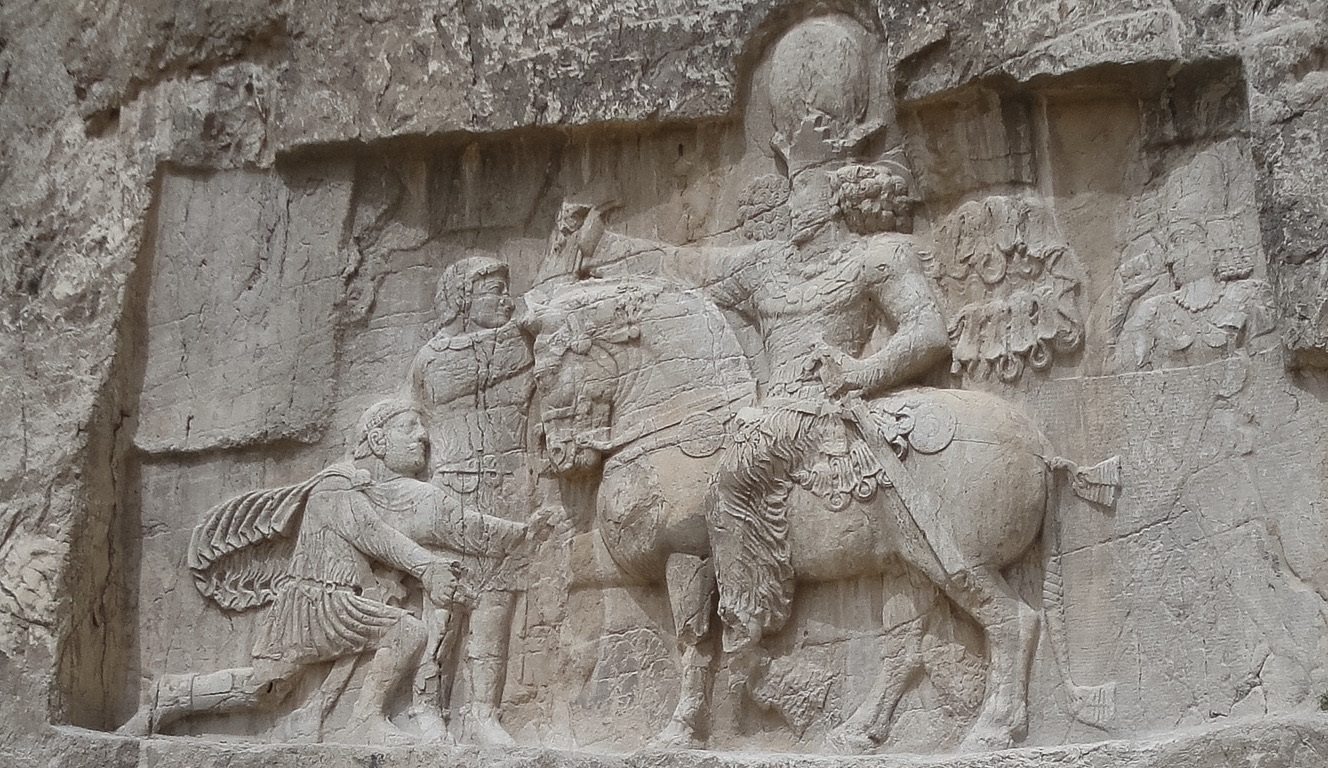
A bas-relief at Naqsh-e Rustam depicting the victory of Sasanian ruler Shapur I over Roman ruler Valerian and Philip the Arab

The Parthian monarchy was succeeded by the Persian dynasty of the Sasanians in 224 AD. By the time of the Sasanian Empire, a national culture that was fully aware of being Iranian took shape, partially motivated by restoration and revival of the wisdom of "the old sages" (dānāgān pēšēnīgān). Other aspects of this national culture included the glorification of a great heroic past and an archaizing spirit. Throughout the period, Iranian identity reached its height in every aspect. Middle Persian, which is the immediate ancestor of Modern Persian and a variety of other Iranian dialects, became the official language of the empire and was greatly diffused among Iranians.

The Parthians and the Sasanians would also extensively interact with the Romans culturally. The Roman–Persian wars and the Byzantine–Sasanian wars would shape the landscape of West Asia, Europe, the Caucasus, North Africa, and the Mediterranean Basin for centuries. For a period of over 400 years, the Sasanians and the neighboring Byzantines were recognized as the two leading powers in the world. Cappadocia in Late Antiquity, now well into the Roman era, still retained a significant Iranian character; Stephen Mitchell notes in the Oxford Dictionary of Late Antiquity: "Many inhabitants of Cappadocia were of Persian descent and Iranian fire worship is attested as late as 465".

Following the Arab conquest of the Sasanian Empire in the medieval times, the Arab caliphates established their rule over the region for the next several centuries, during which the long process of the Islamization of Iran took place. Confronting the cultural and linguistic dominance of the Persians, beginning by the Umayyad Caliphate, the Arab conquerors began to establish Arabic as the primary language of the subject peoples throughout their empire, sometimes by force, further confirming the new political reality over the region. The Arabic term ʿAjam, denoting "people unable to speak properly", was adopted as a designation for non-Arabs (or non-Arabic speakers), especially the Persians. Although the term had developed a derogatory meaning and implied cultural and ethnic inferiority, it was gradually accepted as a synonym for "Persian" and still remains today as a designation for the Persian-speaking communities native to the modern Arab states of the Middle East. A series of Muslim Iranian kingdoms were later established on the fringes of the declining Abbasid Caliphate, including that of the ninth-century Samanids, under the reign of whom the Persian language was used officially for the first time after two centuries of no attestation of the language, now having received the Arabic script and a large Arabic vocabulary. Persian language and culture continued to prevail after the invasions and conquests by the Mongols and the Turks (including the Ilkhanate, Ghaznavids, Seljuks, Khwarazmians, and Timurids), who were themselves significantly Persianized, further developing in Asia Minor, Central Asia, and South Asia, where Persian culture flourished by the expansion of the Persianate societies, particularly those of Turco-Persian and Indo-Persian blends.

Al-Masudi states:

The Persians are a people whose borders are the Mahat Mountains and Azarbaijan up to Armenia and Arran, and Bayleqan and Darband, and Ray and Tabaristan and Masqat and Shabaran and Jorjan and Abarshahr, and that is Nishabur, and Herat and Marv and other places in land of Khorasan, and Sejistan and Kerman and Fars and Ahvaz... All these lands were once one kingdom with one sovereign and one language...although the language differed slightly. The language, however, is one, in that its letters are written the same way and used the same way in composition. There are, then, different languages such as Pahlavi, Dari, Azari, as well as other Persian languages.

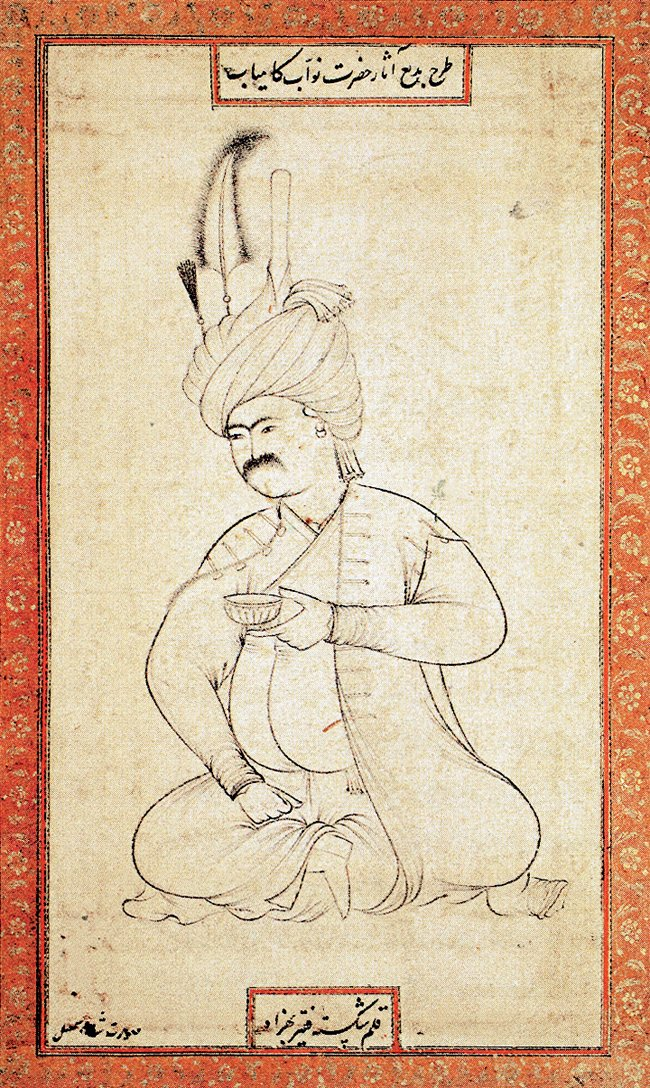
One of the first actions performed by Shah Ismail I of the Safavid dynasty was the proclamation of Twelver Shia Islam as the official religion of his newly founded Persian Empire

After over eight centuries of foreign rule within the region, the Iranian hegemony was reestablished by the emergence of the Safavid Empire in the 16th century. Under the Safavid Empire, focus on Persian language and identity was further revived, and the political evolution of the empire once again maintained Persian as the main language of the country. During the times of the Safavids and subsequent modern Iranian dynasties such as the Qajars, architectural and iconographic elements from the time of the Sasanian Persian Empire were reincorporated, linking the modern country with its ancient past. Contemporary embracement of the legacy of Iran's ancient empires, with an emphasis on the Achaemenid Persian Empire, developed particularly under the reign of the Pahlavi dynasty, providing the motive of a modern nationalistic pride. Iran's modern architecture was then inspired by that of the country's classical eras, particularly with the adoption of details from the ancient monuments in the Achaemenid capitals Persepolis and Pasargadae and the Sasanian capital Ctesiphon. Fars, corresponding to the ancient province of Persia, with its modern capital Shiraz, became a center of interest, particularly during the annual international Shiraz Arts Festival and the 2,500th anniversary of the founding of the Persian Empire. The Pahlavi rulers modernized Iran, and ruled it until the 1979 Iranian revolution.

== Anthropology ==
In modern Iran, the Persians make up the majority of the population. They are native speakers of the modern dialects of Persian, which serves as the country's official language.

=== Persian language ===
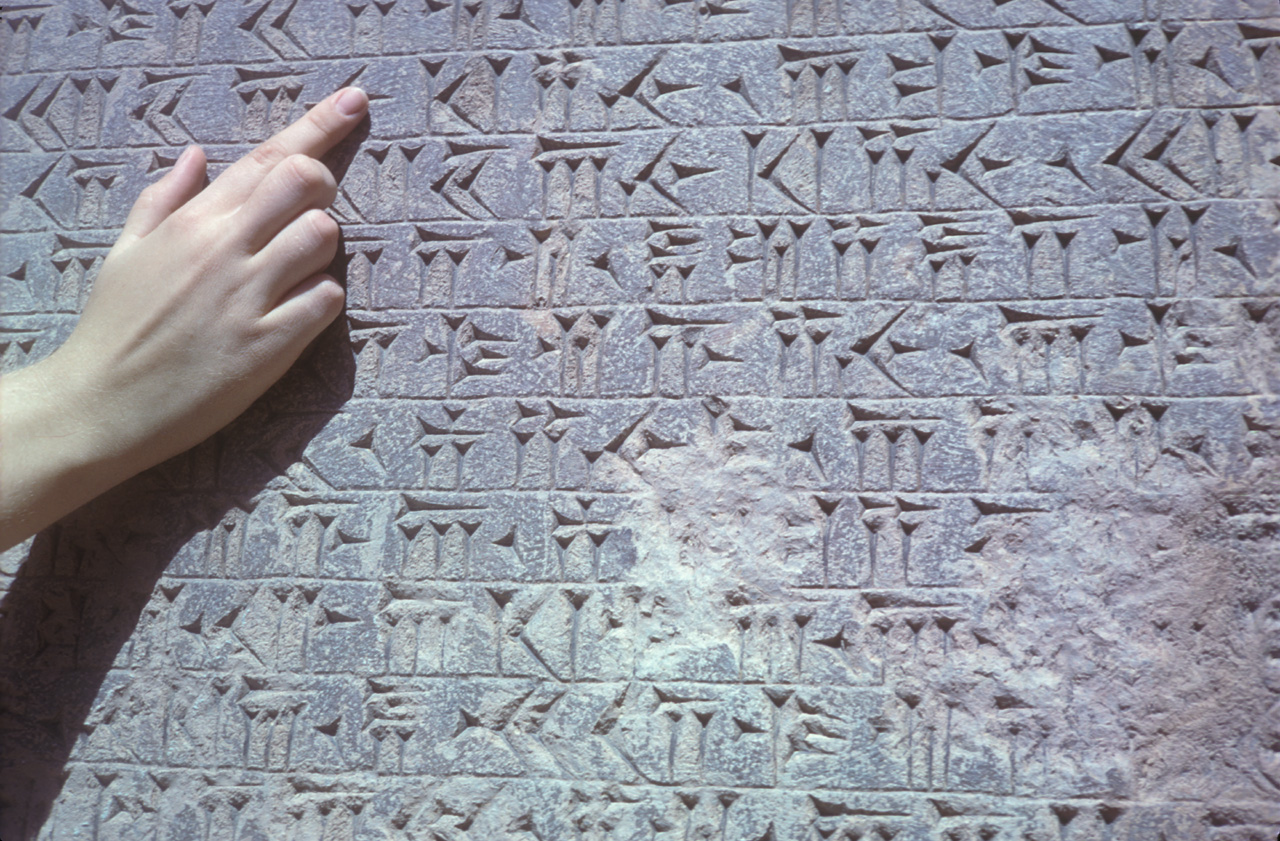
Old Persian inscribed in cuneiform on the Behistun Inscription

The Persian language belongs to the western group of the Iranian branch of the Indo-European language family. Modern Persian is classified as a continuation of Middle Persian, the official religious and literary language of the Sasanian Empire, itself a continuation of Old Persian, which was used by the time of the Achaemenid Empire. Old Persian is one of the oldest Indo-European languages attested in original text. Samples of Old Persian have been discovered in present-day Iran, Armenia, Egypt, Iraq, Romania (Gherla), and Turkey. The oldest attested text written in Old Persian is from the Behistun Inscription, a multilingual inscription from the time of Achaemenid ruler Darius the Great carved on a cliff in western Iran.

=== Related groups ===
There are several ethnic groups and communities that are either ethnically or linguistically related to the Persian people, living predominantly in Iran, and also within Afghanistan, Tajikistan, Uzbekistan, the Caucasus, Turkey, Iraq, and the Arab states of the Persian Gulf.

The Tajiks are a people native to Tajikistan, Afghanistan, and Uzbekistan who speak Persian in a variety of dialects. The Tajiks of Tajikistan and Uzbekistan are native speakers of Tajik, which is the official language of Tajikistan, and those in Afghanistan speak Dari, one of the two official languages of Afghanistan.

The Tat people, a people native to the Caucasus (primarily living in the Republic of Azerbaijan and the Russian republic of Dagestan), speak a language (Tat language) that is closely related to Persian. The origin of the Tat people is traced to an Iranian-speaking population that was resettled in the Caucasus by the time of the Sasanian Empire.

The Lurs, a people native to western Iran, are often associated with the Persians and the Kurds. They speak various dialects of the Luri language, which is considered to be a descendant of Middle Persian.

The Hazaras, making up the third largest ethnic group in Afghanistan, speak a variety of Persian by the name of Hazaragi, which is more precisely a part of the Dari dialect continuum. Genetic studies show that the Hazaras have significant East and Central Asian (Mongoliс/Turkic) ancestry mixed with West Asian (Iranian/Persian) roots, making them genetically closer to Central Asian Turkic groups such as Uzbeks and Uighurs than to other Iranian ethnic groups.

The Aimaqs, a semi-nomadic people native to Afghanistan, speak a variety of Persian by the name of Aimaqi, which also belongs to the Dari dialect continuum.

Persian-speaking communities native to modern Arab countries are generally designated as Ajam, including the Ajam of Bahrain, the Ajam of Iraq, the Ajam of Kuwait, and the Ajam of UAE.

The Parsis are a Zoroastrian community of Persian descent who migrated to South Asia, to escape religious persecution after the fall of the Sassanian Empire. They have had a significant role in the development of India, Pakistan and Sri Lanka, and also played a role in the development of Iranian nationalism during the late Qajar years and Pahlavi dynasty. They are primarily located in the western regions of India principally the states of Gujarat and Maharashtra, with smaller communities in other parts of India and in South and Southeast Asia. They speak a dialect version of Gujarati, and no longer speak in Persian. They do however continue to use Avestan as their liturgical language. The Parsis have adapted many practices and tendencies of the Indian groups that surrounded them, such as Indian dress norms, and the observance of many Indian festivals and ceremonies.

== Culture ==
From Persis and throughout the Median, Achaemenid, Parthian, and Sasanian empires of ancient Iran to the neighboring Greek city states and the kingdom of Macedon, and later throughout the medieval Islamic world, all the way to modern Iran and others parts of Eurasia, Persian culture has been extended, celebrated, and incorporated. This is due mainly to its geopolitical conditions, and its intricate relationship with the ever-changing political arena once as dominant as the Achaemenid Empire.

The artistic heritage of the Persians is eclectic and has included contributions from both the east and the west. Due to the central location of Iran, Persian art has served as a fusion point between eastern and western traditions. Persians have contributed to various forms of art, including calligraphy, carpet weaving, glasswork, lacquerware, marquetry (khatam), metalwork, miniature illustration, mosaic, pottery, and textile design.

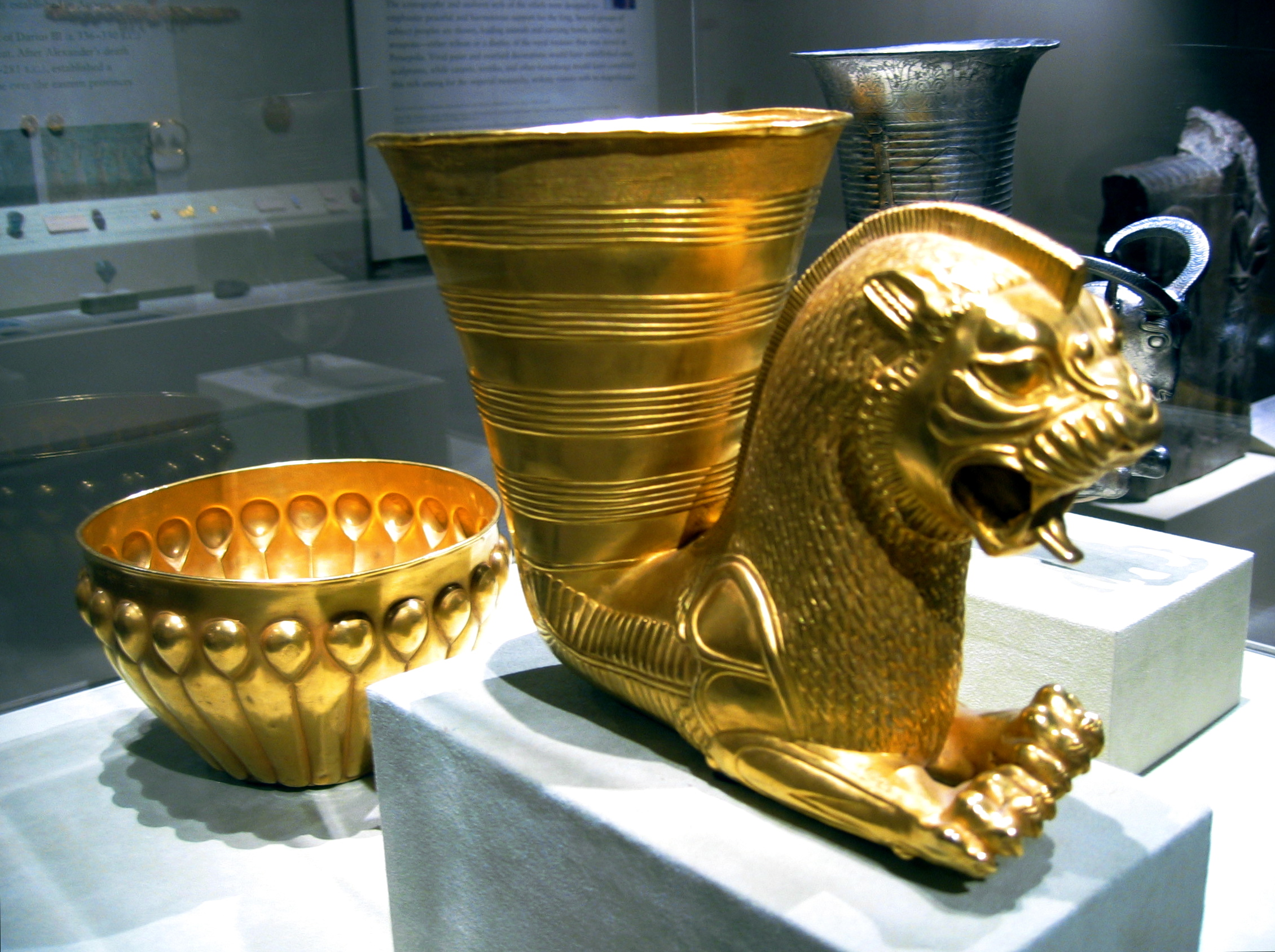
5th-century BC Achaemenid gold vessels. Metropolitan Museum of Art, New York City

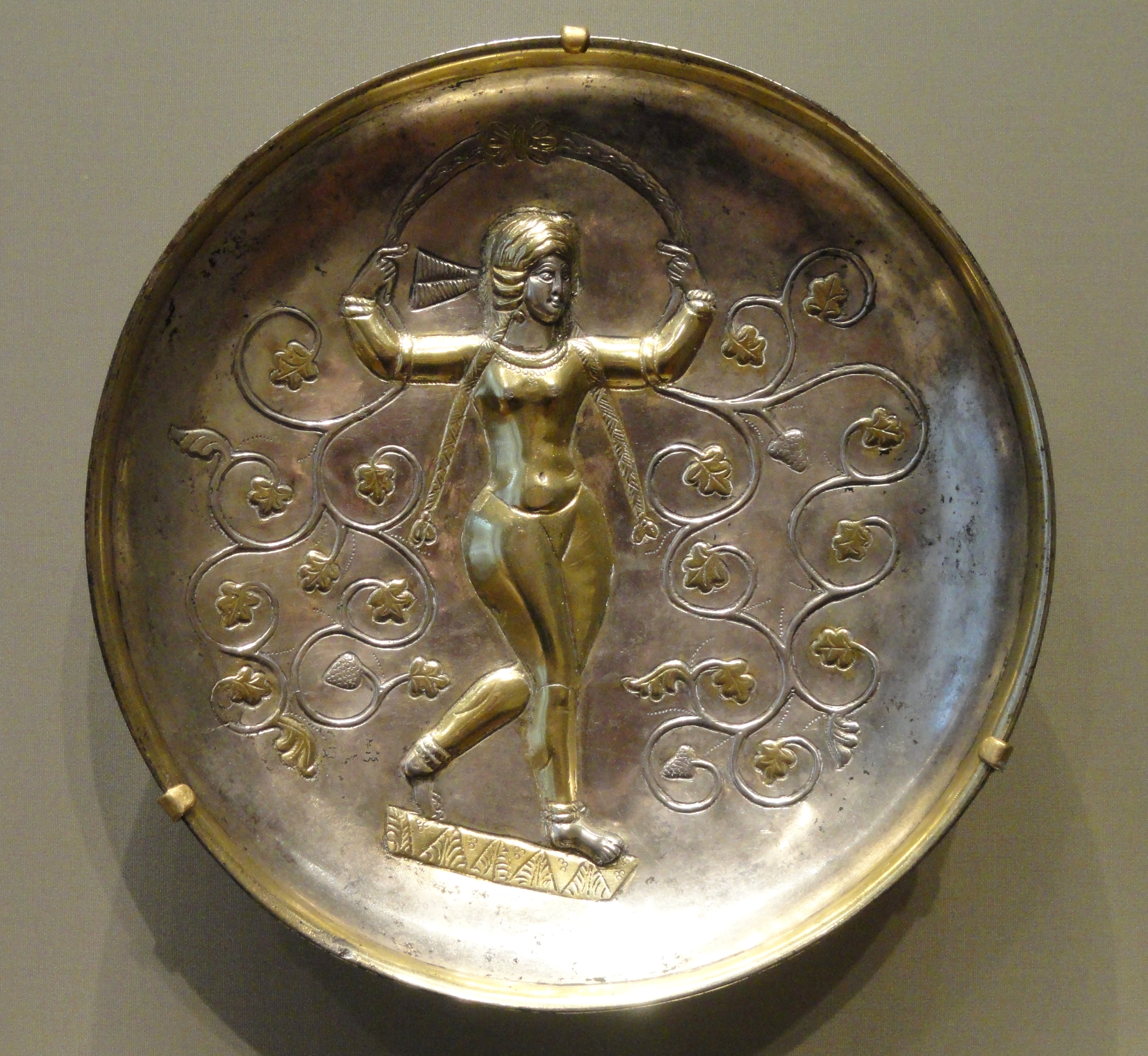
Ancient Iranian goddess Anahita depicted on a Sasanian silver vessel. Cleveland Museum of Art, Cleveland

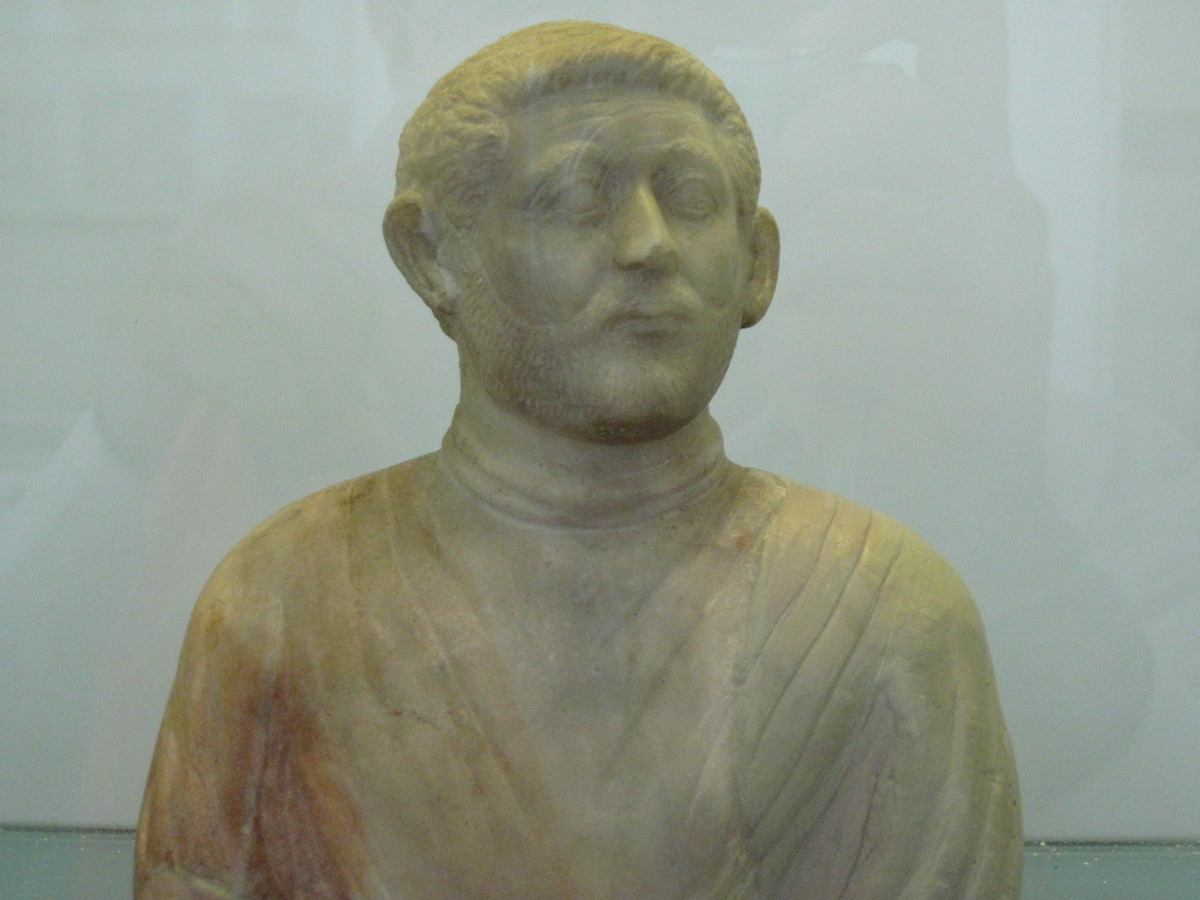
Sasanian marble bust. National Museum of Iran, Tehran

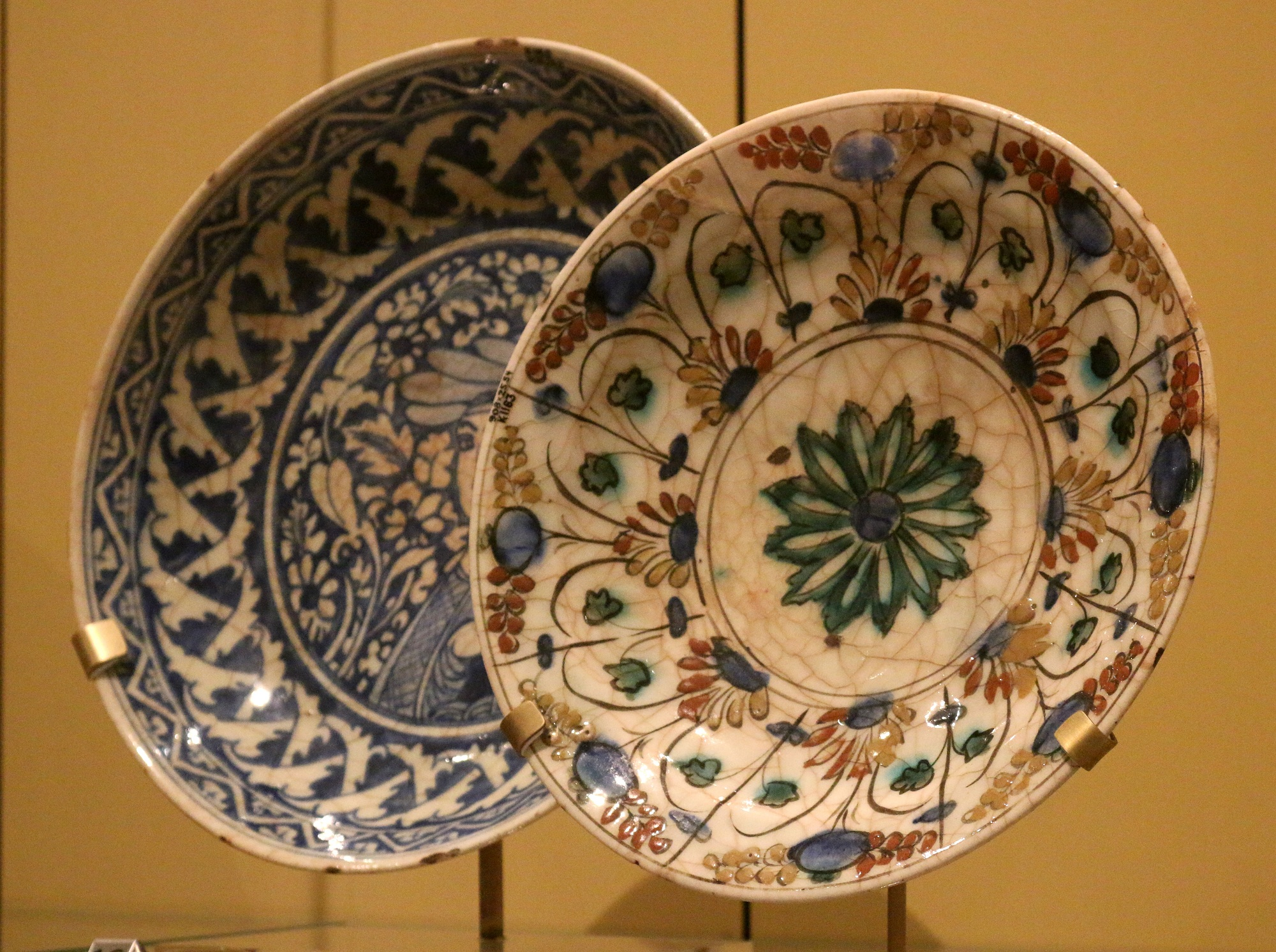
17th-century Persian potteries from Isfahan. Royal Ontario Museum, Toronto

=== Literature ===
The Persian language is known to have one of the world's oldest and most influential literatures. Old Persian written works are attested on several inscriptions from between the 6th and the 4th centuries BC, and Middle Persian literature is attested on inscriptions from the Parthian and Sasanian eras and in Zoroastrian and Manichaean scriptures from between the 3rd to the 10th century AD. New Persian literature flourished after the Arab conquest of Iran with its earliest records from the 9th century, and was developed as a court tradition in many eastern courts. The Shahnameh of Ferdowsi, the works of Rumi, the Rubaiyat of Omar Khayyam, the Panj Ganj of Nizami Ganjavi, the Divān of Hafez, The Conference of the Birds by Attar of Nishapur, and the miscellanea of Gulistan and Bustan by Saadi Shirazi are among the famous works of medieval Persian literature. A thriving contemporary Persian literature has also been formed by the works of writers such as Ahmad Shamlou, Forough Farrokhzad, Mehdi Akhavan-Sales, Parvin E'tesami, Sadegh Hedayat, and Simin Daneshvar, among others.

Not all Persian literature is written in Persian, as works written by Persians in other languages—such as Arabic and Greek—might also be included. At the same time, not all literature written in Persian is written by ethnic Persians or Iranians, as Turkic, Caucasian, and Indic authors have also used Persian literature in the environment of Persianate cultures.

=== Architecture ===
The most notable examples of ancient Persian architecture are the works of the Achaemenids hailing from Persis. Achaemenid architecture, dating from the expansion of the empire around 550 BC, flourished in a period of artistic growth that left a legacy ranging from Cyrus the Great's solemn tomb at Pasargadae to the structures at Persepolis and Naqsh-e Rostam. The Bam Citadel, a massive structure at 1,940,000 square feet (180,000 m^{2}) constructed on the Silk Road in Bam, is from around the 5th century BC. The quintessential feature of Achaemenid architecture was its eclectic nature, with elements from Median architecture, Assyrian architecture, and Asiatic Greek architecture all incorporated.

The architectural heritage of the Sasanian Empire includes, among others, castle fortifications such as the Fortifications of Derbent (located in North Caucasus, now part of Russia), the Rudkhan Castle and the Shapur-Khwast Castle, palaces such as the Palace of Ardashir and the Sarvestan Palace, bridges such as the Shahrestan Bridge and the Shapuri Bridge, the Archway of Ctesiphon, and the reliefs at Taq-e Bostan.

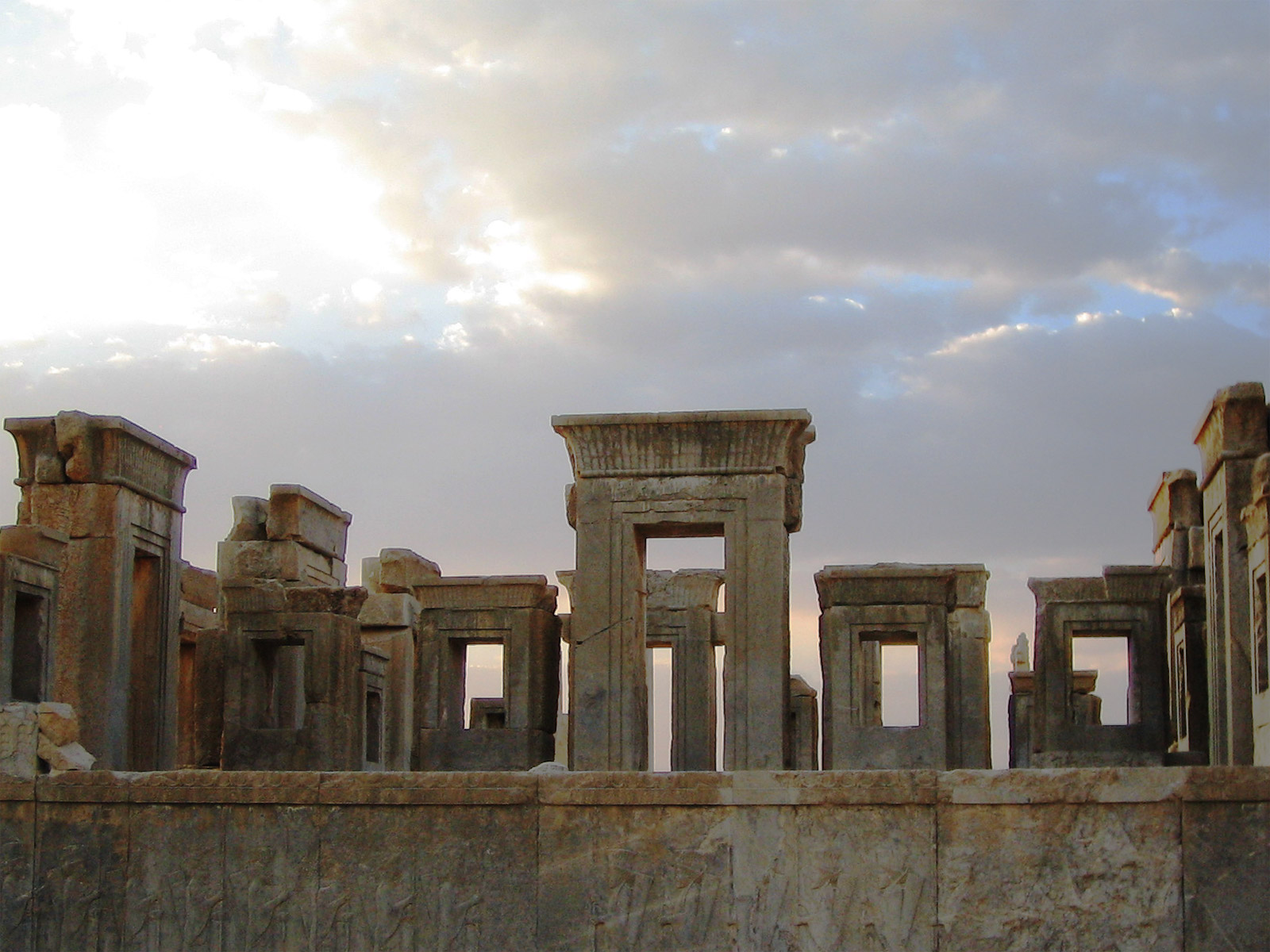
Ruins of the Tachara, Persepolis

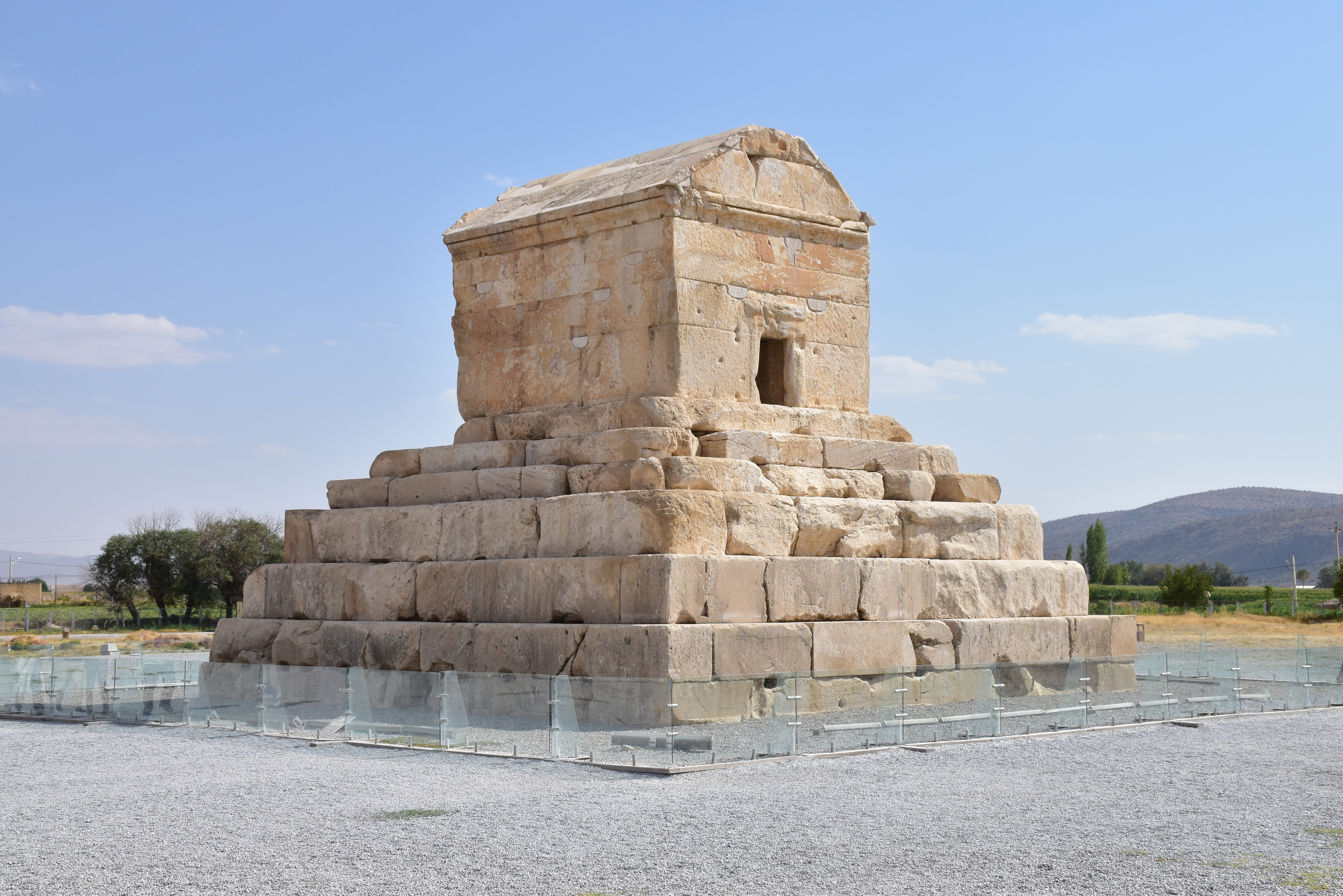
Tomb of Cyrus, Pasargadae

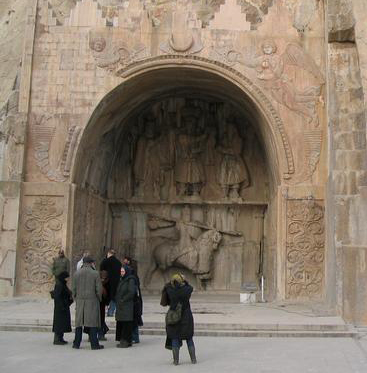
The Sasanian reliefs at Taq-e Bostan

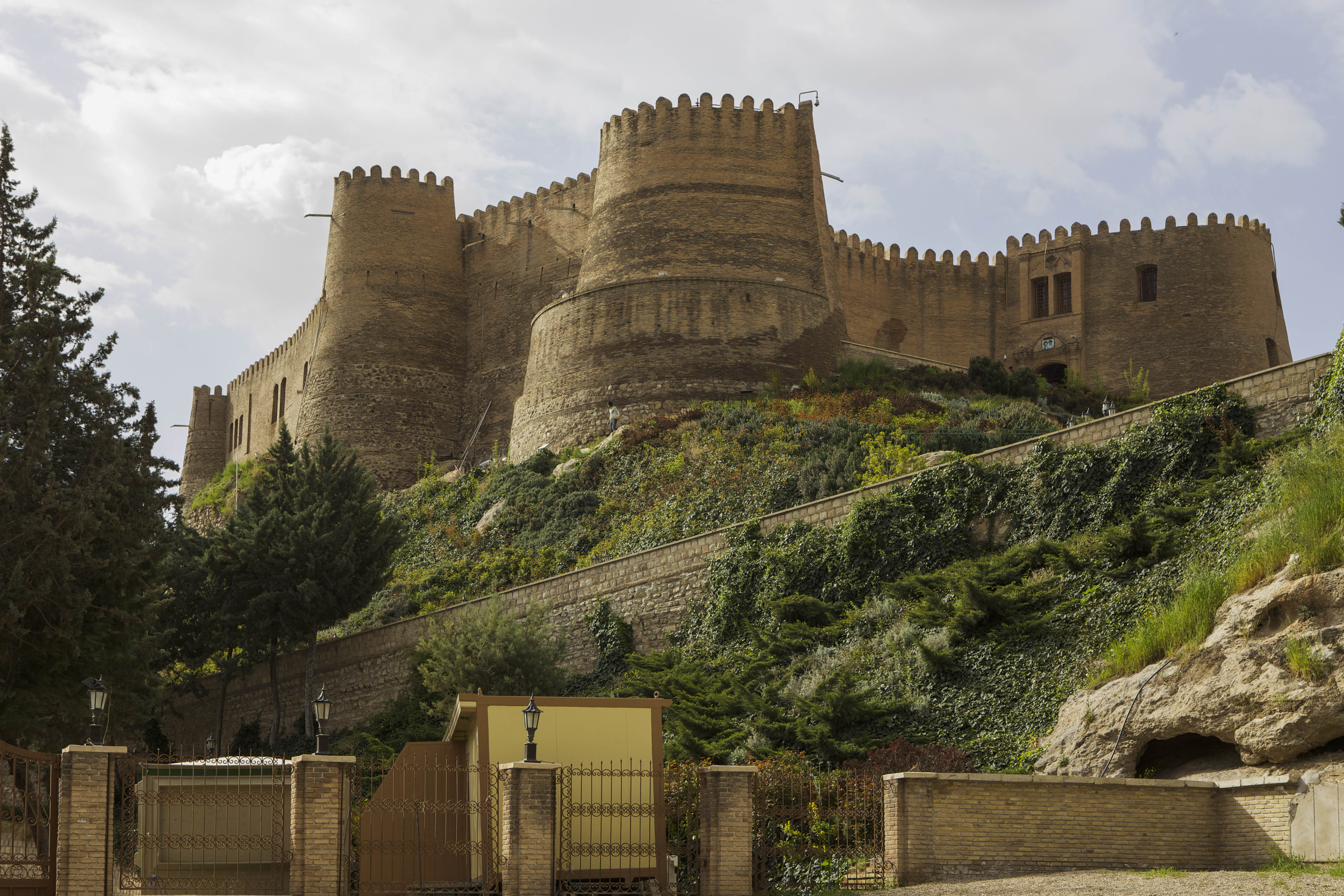
Shapur-Khwast Castle, Khorramabad

Architectural elements from the time of Iran's ancient Persian empires have been adopted and incorporated in later period. They were used especially during the modernization of Iran under the reign of the Pahlavi dynasty to contribute to the characterization of the modern country with its ancient history.

==== Gardens ====
Xenophon, in his Oeconomicus, states:

"The Great King [Cyrus II]...in all the districts he resides in and visits, takes care that there are parádeisos ("paradise") as they [Persians] call them, full of the good and beautiful things that the soil produce."

The Persian garden, the earliest examples of which were found throughout the Achaemenid Empire, has an integral position in Persian architecture. Gardens assumed an important place for the Achaemenid monarchs, and utilized the advanced Achaemenid knowledge of water technologies, including aqueducts, earliest recorded gravity-fed water rills, and basins arranged in a geometric system. The enclosure of this symmetrically arranged planting and irrigation by an infrastructure such as a palace created the impression of "paradise". The word paradise itself originates from Avestan pairidaēza (Old Persian paridaida; New Persian pardis, ferdows), which literally translates to "walled-around". Characterized by its quadripartite (čārbāq) design, the Persian garden was evolved and developed into various forms throughout history, and was also adopted in various other cultures in Eurasia. It was inscribed on UNESCO's World Heritage List in June 2011.

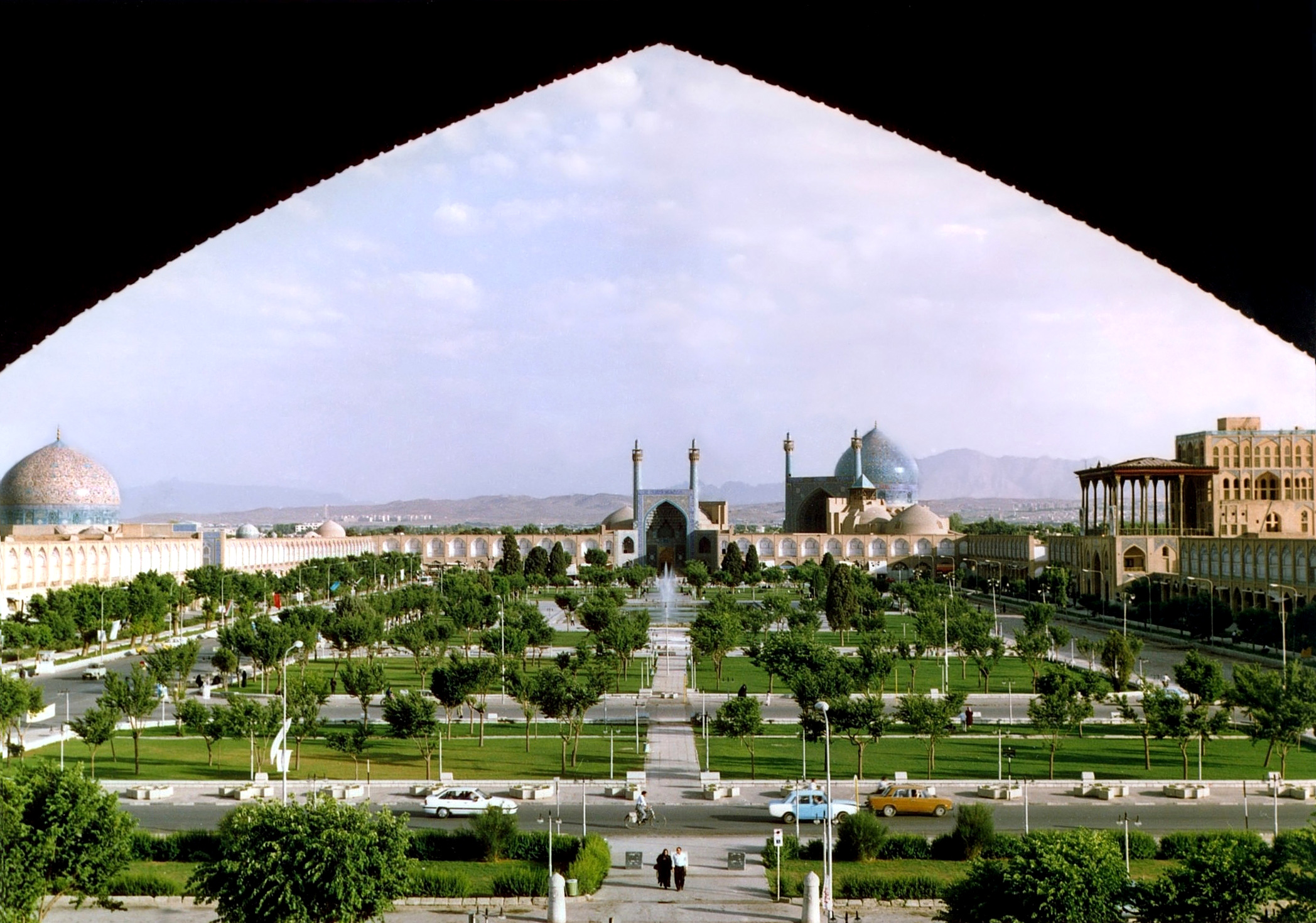
Shah Square, Isfahan

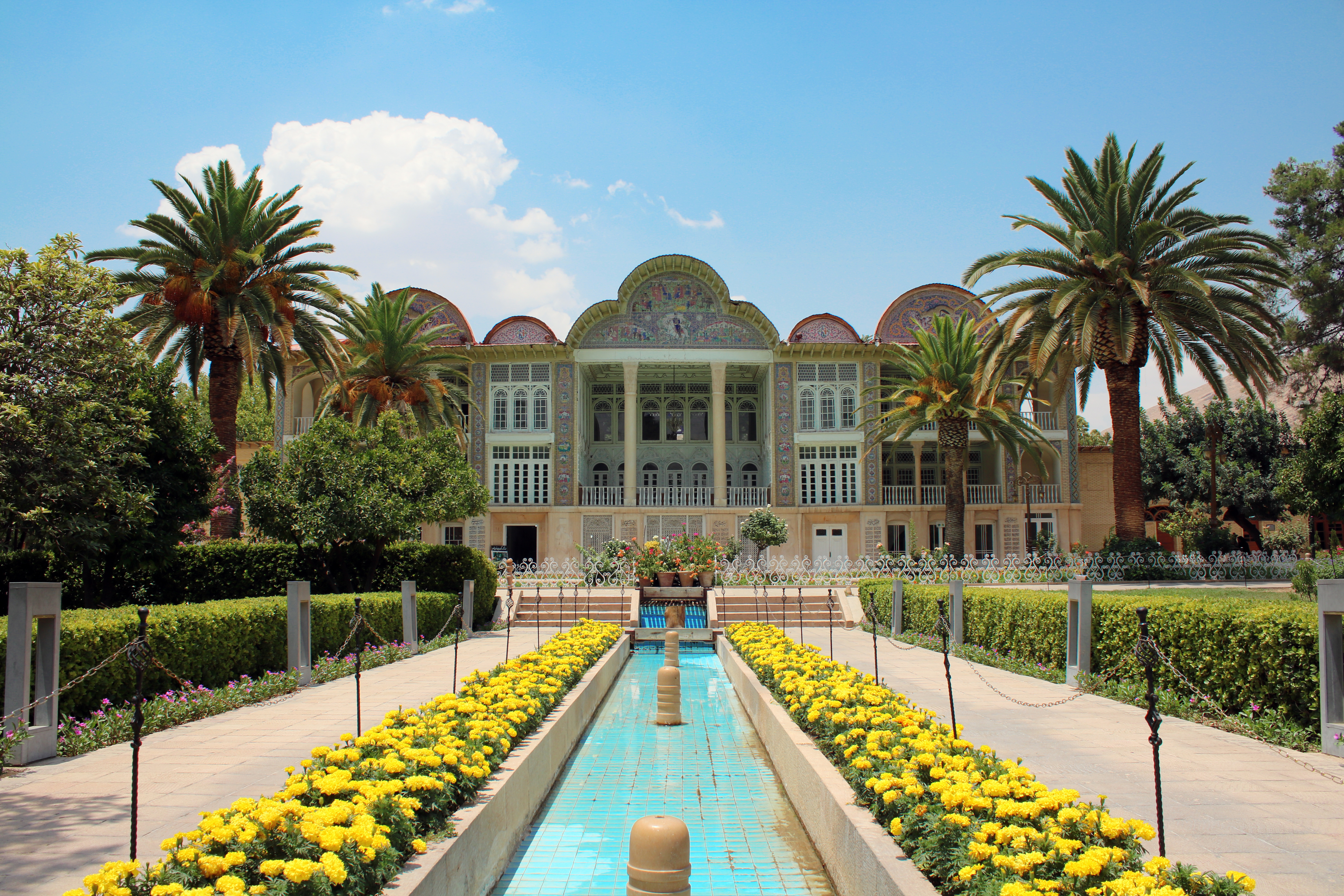
Eram Garden, Shiraz

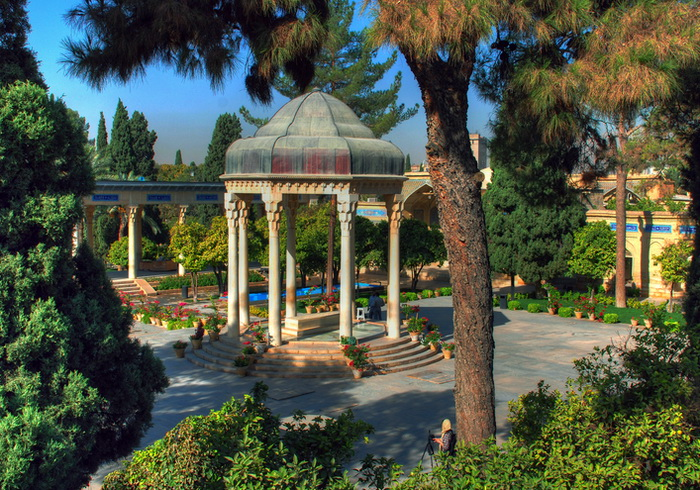
Tomb of Hafez, Shiraz

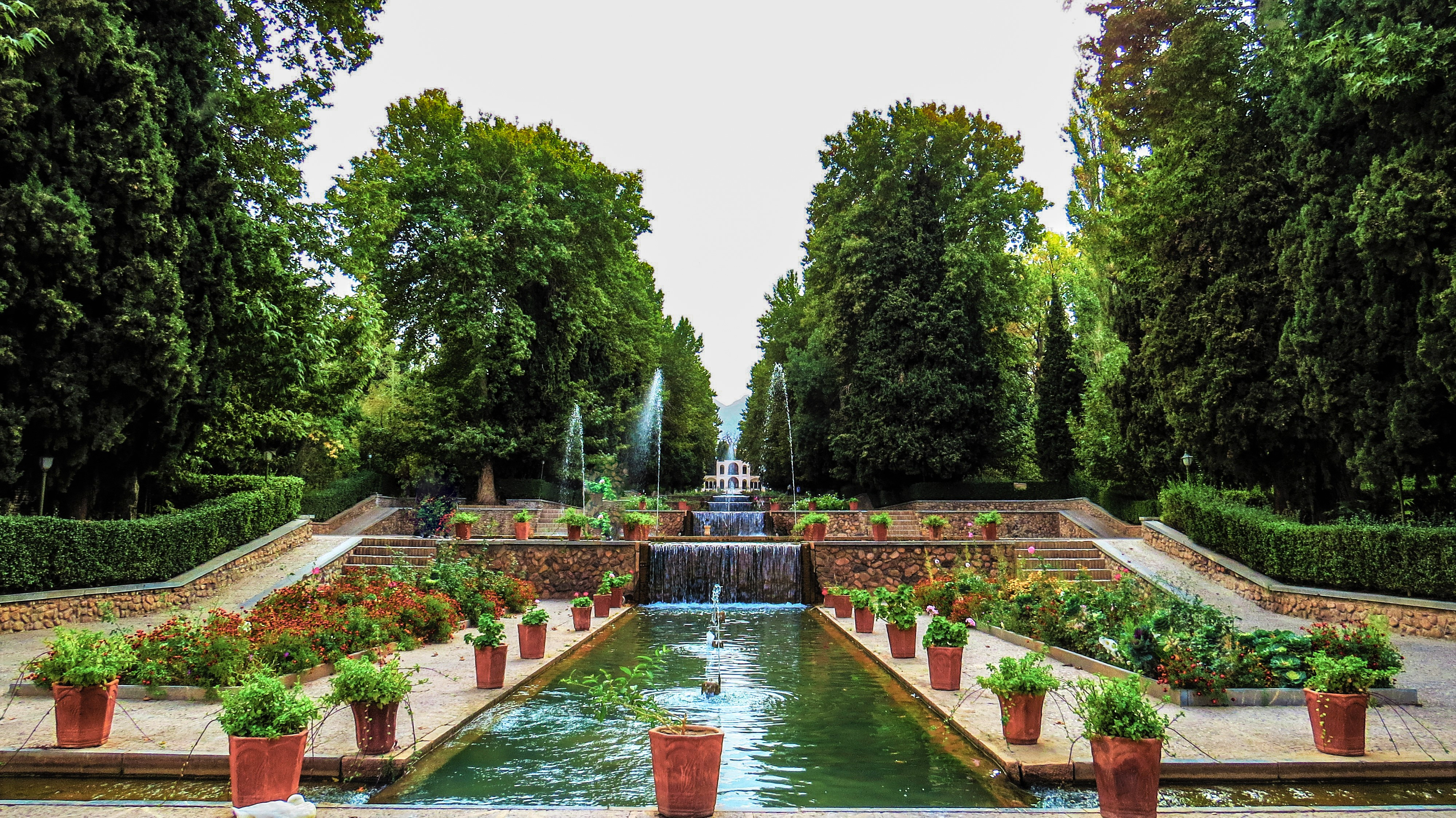
Shazdeh Garden, Kerman

=== Carpets ===
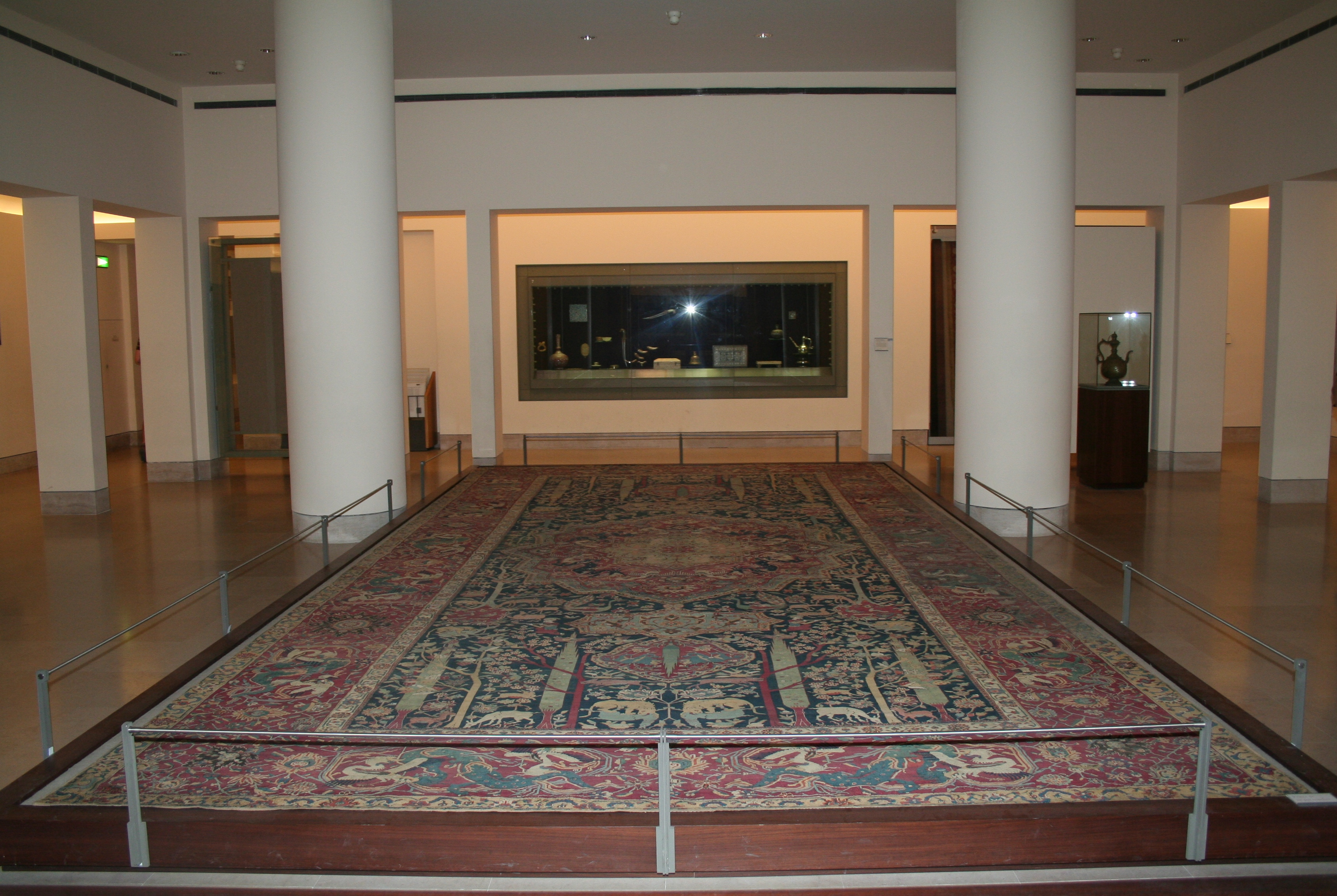
A Persian carpet kept at the Louvre

Carpet weaving is an essential part of the Persian culture, and Persian rugs are said to be one of the most detailed hand-made works of art.

Achaemenid rug and carpet artistry is well recognized. Xenophon describes the carpet production in the city of Sardis, stating that the locals take pride in their carpet production. A special mention of Persian carpets is also made by Athenaeus of Naucratis in his Deipnosophistae, as he describes a "delightfully embroidered" Persian carpet with "preposterous shapes of griffins".

The Pazyryk carpet, a Scythian pile-carpet dating back to the 4th century BC that is regarded as the world's oldest existing carpet, depicts elements of Assyrian and Achaemenid designs, including stylistic references to the stone slab designs found in Persian royal buildings.

=== Music ===
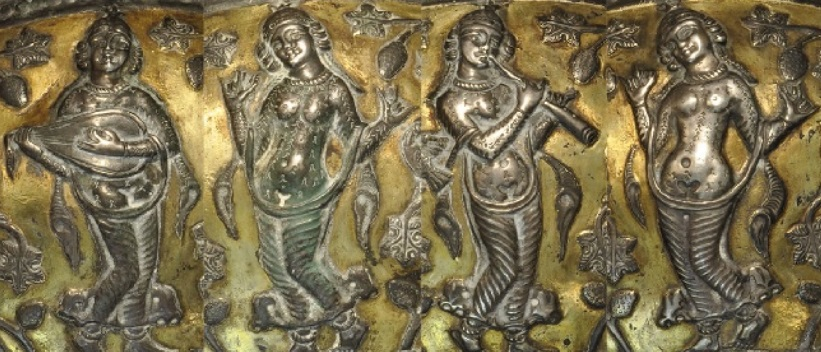
Dancers and musical instrument players depicted on a Sasanian silver bowl from the 5th-7th century AD

According to the accounts reported by Xenophon, a great number of singers were present at the Achaemenid court. However, little information is available from the music of that era. The music scene of the Sasanian Empire has a more available and detailed documentation than the earlier periods, and is especially more evident within the context of Zoroastrian musical rituals. Overall, Sasanian music was influential and was adopted in the subsequent eras.

Iranian music, as a whole, utilizes a variety of musical instruments that are unique to the region, and has remarkably evolved since the ancient and medieval times. In traditional Sasanian music, the octave was divided into seventeen tones. By the end of the 13th century, Iranian music also maintained a twelve-interval octave, which resembled the western counterparts.

=== Observances ===
The Iranian New Year's Day Nowruz, which translates to "new day", is celebrated by Persians and other peoples of Iran to mark the beginning of spring on the vernal equinox on the first day of Farvardin, the first month of the Iranian calendar, which corresponds to around March 21 in the Gregorian calendar. An ancient tradition that has been preserved in Iran and several other countries that were under the influence of the ancient empires of Iran, Nowruz has been registered on UNESCO's Intangible Cultural Heritage Lists. In Iran, the Nowruz celebrations (incl. Charshanbe Suri and Sizdebedar) begin on the eve of the last Wednesday of the preceding year in the Iranian calendar and last on the 13th day of the new year. Islamic festivals are also widely celebrated by Muslim Persians.

== See also ==
- Demographics of Iran
  - Ethnicities in Iran
- Name of Iran

== Sources ==
- Ansari, Ali M. (2014). Iran: A Very Short Introduction. Oxford University Press. ISBN 978-0-19-966934-9.
- Boyce, Mary (2001). Zoroastrians: Their Religious Beliefs and Practices. Psychology Press. ISBN 978-0-415-23902-8.
- McGing, B.C. (1986). The Foreign Policy of Mithridates VI Eupator, King of Pontus. BRILL. ISBN 978-90-04-07591-7.
- Mitchell, Stephen (2018). "Cappadocia". In Nicholson, Oliver (ed.). The Oxford Dictionary of Late Antiquity. Oxford University Press. ISBN 978-0-19-256246-3.
- Raditsa, Leo (1983). "Iranians in Asia Minor". In Yarshater, Ehsan (ed.). The Cambridge History of Iran, Vol. 3 (1): The Seleucid, Parthian and Sasanian periods. Cambridge University Press. ISBN 978-1-139-05494-2.
- Roisman, Joseph; Worthington, Ian (2010). A Companion to Ancient Macedonia. John Wiley and Sons. ISBN 978-1-4051-7936-2.
- Roisman, Joseph; Worthington, Ian (2011). A Companion to Ancient Macedonia. John Wiley and Sons. ISBN 978-1-4443-5163-7.
- Van Dam, Raymond (2002). Kingdom of Snow: Roman Rule and Greek Culture in Cappadocia. University of Pennsylvania Press. ISBN 978-0-8122-3681-1.
