= Xaçınabad =

- Municipality
- Location within Azerbaijan
- Coordinates: 39°48′04″N 47°29′22″E
- Country: Azerbaijan
- Rayon: Beylagan

Population
  - Total: 195
- Time zone: UTC+4 (AZT)
  - Summer (DST): UTC+5 (AZT)

Xaçınabad (also, Khachinstroy) is a village and the least populous municipality in the Beylagan Rayon of Azerbaijan. It has a population of 195.
