= Bolsulu =

- Municipality
- Location within Azerbaijan
- Coordinates: 39°48′01″N 47°34′34″E
- Country: Azerbaijan
- Rayon: Beylagan

Population (2008)
  - Total: 1,591
- Time zone: UTC+4 (AZT)
  - Summer (DST): UTC+5 (AZT)

Bolsulu is a village and municipality in the Beylagan Rayon of Azerbaijan. It has a population of 1,591.
