= Örənqala =

- Municipality
- Location within Azerbaijan
- Coordinates: 39°53′09″N 47°29′46″E
- Country: Azerbaijan
- Rayon: Beylagan

Population
  - Total: 1,840
- Time zone: UTC+4 (AZT)
  - Summer (DST): UTC+5 (AZT)

Örənqala (also, Orankala) is a village and municipality in the Beylagan Rayon of Azerbaijan. It has a population of 1,840.

== Notable natives ==
- Nazim Guliyev — National Hero of Azerbaijan.
