= Bahar, Azerbaijan =

Coordinates: 39°44′N 47°44′E

Bahar is a village and municipality in the Beylagan Rayon of Azerbaijan. It has a population of 1,129.
