= Yeni Mil =

Village in Beylagan Rayon, Azerbaijan

Coordinates: 39°41′N 47°39′E

Yeni Mil is a village and municipality in the Beylagan Rayon of Azerbaijan. It has a population of 2,023.
