= Şərq =

- Municipality
- Location within Azerbaijan
- Coordinates: 39°48′53″N 47°46′15″E
- Country: Azerbaijan
- Rayon: Beylagan

Population (2008)
  - Total: 1,909
- Time zone: UTC+4 (AZT)
  - Summer (DST): UTC+5 (AZT)

Şərq (also, Sharg) is a village and municipality in the Beylagan Rayon of Azerbaijan. It has a population of 1,909.

== Bibliography ==
- Şərq at GEOnet Names Server
