= Eyvazalılar =

- Municipality
- Location within Azerbaijan
- Coordinates: 39°52′07″N 47°38′01″E
- Country: Azerbaijan
- Rayon: Beylagan

Population
  - Total: 2,248
- Time zone: UTC+4 (AZT)
  - Summer (DST): UTC+5 (AZT)

Eyvazalılar (also, Eyvazallar, Eyvazalylar, and Eyvazlılar) is a village and municipality in the Beylagan Rayon of Azerbaijan. It has a population of 2,248.
