= Orta Əlinəzərli =

Village and municipality in Beylagan Rayon, Azerbaijan

Coordinates: 39°48′N 47°42′E

Orta Əlinəzərli is a village and municipality in the Beylagan Rayon of Azerbaijan. It has a population of 1,060.
