= Milabad =

- Municipality
- Location within Azerbaijan
- Coordinates: 39°41′08″N 47°38′29″E
- Country: Azerbaijan
- Rayon: Beylagan

Population
  - Total: 2,196
- Time zone: UTC+4 (AZT)
  - Summer (DST): UTC+5 (AZT)

Milabad (also, Yenimil’) is a village and municipality in the Beylagan Rayon of Azerbaijan. It has a population of 2,196.
