= Peygambar =

- Location within Azerbaijan
- Coordinates: 39°48′N 47°38′E
- Country: Azerbaijan
- Rayon: Beylagan
- Time zone: UTC+4 (AZT)
  - Summer (DST): UTC+5 (AZT)

Peygambar is a village in the Beylagan Rayon of Azerbaijan.
