= Yuxarı Kəbirli =

Village in Beylagan Rayon, Azerbaijan

Coordinates: 39°51′N 47°32′E

Yuxarı Kəbirli (known as Səhra until 1994) is a village and municipality in the Beylagan Rayon of Azerbaijan. It has a population of 860.
