= Əmirzeydli =

- Municipality
- Location within Azerbaijan
- Coordinates: 39°35′04″N 47°39′24″E
- Country: Azerbaijan
- Rayon: Beylagan

Population
  - Total: 887
- Time zone: UTC+4 (AZT)
  - Summer (DST): UTC+5 (AZT)

Əmirzeydli (also, Əmirzeyidli and Amirzeitli) is a village and municipality in the Beylagan Rayon of Azerbaijan. It has a population of 887.
