= Günəş =

Coordinates: 39°51′N 47°30′E

Günəş is a village and municipality in the Beylagan Rayon of Azerbaijan. It has a population of 890.
