= Aşıqalılar =

- Municipality
- Location within Azerbaijan
- Coordinates: 39°42′07″N 47°50′04″E
- Country: Azerbaijan
- Rayon: Beylagan

Population
  - Total: 2,016
- Time zone: UTC+4 (AZT)
  - Summer (DST): UTC+5 (AZT)

Aşıqalılar (also, Ashgalar, Ashkallar, Ashygalylar, and Gadzhi-Kharrar) is a village and municipality in the Beylagan Rayon of Azerbaijan. It has a population of 2,016.
