= Eyvazallar =

- Location within Azerbaijan
- Coordinates: 40°01′N 47°44′E
- Country: Azerbaijan
- Rayon: Beylagan
- Time zone: UTC+4 (AZT)
  - Summer (DST): UTC+5 (AZT)

Eyvazallar (also, Vibozallar) is a village in the Beylagan Rayon of Azerbaijan.
