= İmamverdili =

- Municipality
- Location within Azerbaijan
- Coordinates: 39°46′36″N 47°52′30″E
- Country: Azerbaijan
- Rayon: Beylagan

Population
  - Total: 1,200
- Time zone: UTC+4 (AZT)
  - Summer (DST): UTC+5 (AZT)

İmamverdili (also, Birinci İmamverdili, Imamverdili Pervoye, and Imash-Verdylyar) is a village and municipality in the Beylagan Rayon of Azerbaijan. It has a population of 1,200.
