= Tajik (word) =

Ethnonym

"Tajik" (Persian: تاجیک, romanized: tājīk; Tajik: тоҷик, romanized: tojik) is a term whose meaning differed throughout history. It is the self-designation of the present-day Tajik people. It started out as a name given by outsiders (exonym). The Middle Persian (or Sogdian or Parthian) word tāzīk ("Arab") is the commonly accepted origin in scholarship. It is derived from the name of the Tayy, an Arab bedouin tribe in Najd, who had been in contact with the Iranian Parthian (247 BC–224 AD) and Sasanian (224–651) empires.

During the Muslim invasion of Central Asia in the 8th-century, the Turks of that region started using täžik to refer to the invading Muslim forces, which besides Arabs, also included Persians native to the middle part of the Zagros Mountains and the region of Fars. By the 11th-century, Persian Muslims of the Oxus River and Khorasan region were referred to as "Tajik" by the Turks of the Kara-Khanid Khanate. Under the rule of the Ghaznavid, Seljuk and Atabeg dynasties (c. 1000–1260), Persians in all of Iran embraced it as the name of their people. The division between Turk and Tajik started to represent the relationship between nomadic military power and civil administration, respectively. "Tajik" was frequently employed by the Turkic or Turco-Mongol governing elite in the Persian literature of the Ilkhanids, Timurids, and Safavids to differentiate Persians from Turks and Mongols. Examples include bitikchiān-e tāzik ("Persian secretaries") by Rashid al-Din Hamadani in Tarikh-e ghazani (1310); ra'iyat-e tāzik ("the Persian peasantry") by Sayf Heravi (c. 1320) and the plural tāžikān by Mirkhvand (died 1498). In contrast to the older terms Ajam and Fors, which also referred to Persians, Tajik was not primarily used to describe a specific language or region.

From the late 13th-century, the variant of tājik became more common, and by the 16th-century, it had become the norm. It was first attested in a trilingual macaronic quatrain by the 13th-century Persian poet Rumi. Tājik and its adjective tājikāna appears in the work of another 13th-century Persian poet, Saadi Shirazi. Because of the long-standing rivalry between the "Men of the Sword" and the "Men of the Pen," the term tājik for Persians in Iran had evolved into a more literary term by the middle of the Safavid era. According to the Italian author Pietro Della Valle during his stay in the Safavid capital Isfahan in 1617, the local Persians only referred to themselves as pārsi and ajami, and they were called tāt and ra'iat ("peasant(ry)", "subject(s)") in a derogatory manner by elite members of the Turkoman Qizilbash.

In 1868, the Persian-speakers in the Khanate of Kokand, the Farghana Valley and the cities of Samarkand and Bukhara were referred to as Tajiks by both themselves and outsiders. It was also used as a self-designation by non-Persian Iranians in several mountainous areas, such as Shughnan and Roshan. However, others typically called themselves by regional names, such as the Yaghnobi people, who called themselves for ghalcha.

The people of present-day Tajikistan had no concept of national identity prior to the Soviet Union. When they were asked to declare their nationality when the Soviet Union was defining its borders, there was a lot of uncertainty, such as in Khujand, where its people did not know if they were Tajiks or Uzbeks. It was after this that the Tajik national identity was created by the Soviets. The country was first created as the Tajik Autonomous Soviet Socialist Republic, an autonomous republic within the Uzbek Soviet Socialist Republic. In 1929, it became its own republic, the Tajik Soviet Socialist Republic.

Distorted by the interconnected goals of Soviet ethnic policies and the rise of Tajik nationalism, the meaning of "Tajik" has been altered in both Tajik and Russian academic discourse, throughout the Soviet and post-Soviet eras. As the Iranologist John Perry notes, this has resulted in a situation where "the tail often wags the dog", where a small or unimportant part of something is becoming too important. Through the efforts of prominent Soviet Tajik writers such as Sadriddin Ayni and Bobojon Ghafurov, anachronistic terms such as "Perso-Tajik" or "Tajik-Persian" entered academic sources about Persian literature and the cultural history of Iran, India and Central Asia.

== Sources ==
- Kılavuz, Idil Tunçer (2014). Power, Networks and Violent Conflict in Central Asia: A Comparison of Tajikistan and Uzbekistan (1st ed.). Taylor & Francis. ISBN 978-0815377931.
- Perry, John (2009). "Tajik i. The Ethnonym: Origins and Application". In Yarshater, Ehsan (ed.). Encyclopædia Iranica (Online ed.). Encyclopædia Iranica Foundation. ISBN 978-0710090959.
