= Garay Asadov =

Azerbaijani Red Army sergeant (1923–1944)

Garay Latif oglu Asadov
- Gəray Lətif oğlu Əsədov
- Born: 1923; Shakhsevan, TSFSR, Soviet Union
- Died: 12 October 1944 (aged 20–21); Marghita, Romania
- Military career
- Allegiance: Soviet Union
- Branch: Red Army
- Service years: 1942–1944
- Rank: Sergeant
- Unit: 93rd Guards Rifle Division
- Conflicts: World War II; Battle of Kursk; Battle of Debrecen
- Awards: Hero of the Soviet Union

Garay Latif oglu Asadov (Azerbaijani: Gəray Lətif oğlu Əsədov; 1923–12 October 1944) was an Azerbaijani Red Army sergeant and a posthumous Hero of the Soviet Union. Asadov was posthumously awarded the title on 24 March 1945 for his actions during the Debrecen Offensive Operation. He was reported to have killed 16 German soldiers and was killed while covering a bunker opening with his body.

== Early life ==
Asadov was born in 1923 in Shakhsevan in a family of Azerbaijani ethnicity. He received primary education. Asadov worked on the kolkhoz after graduating.

== World War II ==
Asadov was drafted into the Red Army in 1942 and fought in combat from June. He fought in the Battle of Kursk, the capture of Right-bank Ukraine, and Moldova. Asadov became a rifleman in the 281st Guards Rifle Regiment of the 93rd Guards Rifle Division. In October 1944, he fought in the Battle of Debrecen.

On 6 October, during the battle for Vlaha, 10 kilometers southwest of Cluj, Asadov reportedly killed more than 10 German soldiers with grenades. During the battle for Huedin, he reportedly killed the crew of a German fire and opened fire on the German troops with it, reportedly killing more than 24 German soldiers. For his actions in Huedin, Asadov received the Order of the Red Banner on 30 November. On 12 October, during the battle for Marghita, a group of soldiers led by Asadov fought a 40-man German force. The Soviet troops attacked, reportedly killing 16 and capturing others. Later that day, in fighting for the railway station, Asadov reportedly covered the opening of a bunker with his body. On 24 March 1945, he was posthumously awarded the title Hero of the Soviet Union and the Order of Lenin.

== Legacy ==
A sovkhoz and secondary school in Shakhsevan were named for Asadov, along with a street in Beylagan.
