= Qəhrəmanlı, Beylagan =

Qəhrəmanlı
- Municipality
- Location within Azerbaijan
- Coordinates: 39°41′42″N 47°41′24″E
- Country: Azerbaijan
- Rayon: Beylagan

Population (2008)
  - Total: 2,032
- Time zone: UTC+4 (AZT)
  - Summer (DST): UTC+5 (AZT)

Qəhrəmanlı (also Qahramanli, Kagramanli and Kagramanly) is a village and municipality in the Beylagan Rayon of Azerbaijan. It has a population of 2,032.
