= Kagramanly =

- Location within Azerbaijan
- Coordinates: 39°48′0″N 47°36′0″E
- Country: Azerbaijan
- Rayon: Beylagan
- Time zone: UTC+4 (AZT)
  - Summer (DST): UTC+5 (AZT)

Kagramanly is a village in the Beylagan Rayon of Azerbaijan.
