= Kəhrəmanlı =

- Location within Azerbaijan
- Coordinates: 40°28′55″N 46°59′45″E
- Country: Azerbaijan
- Rayon: Yevlakh
- Time zone: UTC+4 (AZT)
  - Summer (DST): UTC+5 (AZT)

Kəhrəmanlı (also, Kagramanly, Kakhramanly or Qaramanlı) is a village in the Yevlakh Rayon of Azerbaijan.
