= Dilshad Aliyarli =

Azerbaijani journalist and writer

- Born: Dilşad Əliyarlı; 1 February 1962 (age 64); Baku, Azerbaijan SSR, USSR
- Occupation: Journalist
- Years active: 1996 - now
- Employer: Voice of America
- Parent: Suleyman Aliyarli

Dilshad Aliyarli (Azerbaijani: Dilşad Əliyarlı) is an Azerbaijani journalist and writer.

== Biography ==
She was born on 1 February 1962 to Azerbaijani academicians Suleyman Aliyarli and Mira Aliyarli in Baku. She graduated from Baku State University with B.A. degree in Oriental Studies; further she studied Arabic at Bourguiba Institute of Modern Languages in Tunisia. Furthermore, she worked as a junior researcher for a while at the Institute of Oriental Studies of the Academy of Sciences of Azerbaijan.

=== Journalism ===
Aliyarli worked as a BBC Azerbaijani reporter in Sarajevo from 1996 to 1998. In 1998 she moved to the United States and was hired as an international broadcaster by VOA Azerbaijani Service. She was the first anchor woman of “Newsflash” — the first daily TV show transmitted from Washington to Azerbaijan. She has covered Azerbaijan and United States for more than 20 years as an anchor, reporter, multimedia editor, and producer. She played a pivotal role in the launch of Azerbaijani television programming at VOA in 2004 and produced more than 400 editions of the service’s flagship weekly show in 2006—Amerika İcmalı (American Review) — a weekly TV show with intend to give the Azerbaijani audience a greater perspective on political and social life in the US and US-Azerbaijan relations. Furthermore, she maintains a blog on Azerbaijani diaspora in US.

=== Women's rights ===
She is a writer with a focus on women's rights. She writes mostly on gender equality, family matters, and fashion on her blog, "Women's World" (Azerbaijani: Qadın dünyası) besides "Visions of Azerbaijan", "OK! Azerbaijan" and "Caspian Crossroads".

== Bibliography ==
- 1999 - Claiming Our Rights: A Manual for Women's Human Rights Education in Muslim Societies (authored by Mahnaz Afkhami and Haleh Vaziri; Azerbaijani translation edited by Dilshad Aliyarli)
- 2016 - Rainbow (Azerbaijani: Göy Qurşağı), Qanun, Baku
