= Tat (ethnonym) =

Term for various ethnic groups

Tat is a historical ethnonym for various ethnic and social groups in the Caucasus, Crimea, and Iran.

The term Tat was used in a verse included in the 11th-century dictionary Dīwān Lughāt al-Turk by Mahmud al-Kashgari, where it was similar to a pejorative synonym of the ethnonym Tajik.

Medieval Bavarian traveler Johann Schiltberger, who visited Crimea in 1396, mentioned that Islamized Goths inhabiting the mountains of southern Crimea were contemptuously designated as Tat (German: Thatt) by the Muslim Kipchaks dwelling the northern Crimean plains. Professor P. Brunn held that this term meant a "religious renegade" or a "conquered race" in the Turkic dialect, whereas the local Tat people were thought to be of heterogenous descent, mixed with the Greeks and the Genoese settlers. History professor Brian Glyn Williams links the root of the Crimean ethnonym with the term employed by the Caucasian Turkic peoples, namely the Karachays, Kumyks, and Balkars, for their non-Turkic neighbors, such as the Mountain Jews.

Although the term Tat continues to be utilized by Turkic groups in and around Azerbaijan (the region in Iran) for non-Turkic groups, a second meaning is also prevalent in Azerbaijan, where nomadic tribal groups, such as the Shahsevans, refer to their settled and non-tribal counterparts, who also speak the same Turkic language, as "Tat". Anthropologist Richard Tapper points out that despite great commonalities between the so-called Tats and the nomads, the latter speaks a Turkic dialect with less borrowings from other languages. While both of these two groups claim they follow more efficient and healthier lifestyles fueled by the lack of understanding of each other, Tats generally differ in valuing their "varied diet," strictly following the law, and observing more conservative religious practices. There is traditionally little interaction between them and the nomads apart from the practice that roughly one-tenth of nomads marry originally settled women and one-fifth of women from nomad groups marry into settled households.

== Bibliography ==
- Foltz, Richard (15 June 2023). A History of the Tajiks: Iranians of the East. Bloomsbury Publishing. ISBN 9780755649679. OCLC 1072054044.
- Tapper, Richard (1988). "Azerbaijan vi. Population and its Occupations and Culture". In Yarshater, Ehsan (ed.). Encyclopædia Iranica. Vol. III/3: Azerbaijan IV–Bačča(-ye) Saqqā. London and New York: Routledge & Kegan Paul. pp. 234–238. ISBN 978-0-71009-115-4.
- Williams, Brian Glyn (2001). The Crimean Tatars: The Diaspora Experience and the Forging of a Nation. Brill. ISBN 9789004121225.
