= Bahadur Huseynov =

Azerbaijani jurist and military officer

Bahadur Huseynov (December 15, 1921–December 31, 2016) was Meritorious Jurist of Azerbaijan and a major general.

== Early life ==
Bahadur Mammadgulu oghlu Huseynov was born on 15 December 1921 in the city of Sharur in the Nakhchivan Autonomous Republic. When he was 3 years old, his family decided to move from Nakhchivan to Ganja in order to alleviate their hard living conditions due to the family's financial status. In 1934, after graduation from secondary school in Ganja, Bahadur was accepted into Weaving College in the same city, and in 1938 he graduated from the college and started his first job in the Weaving Factory. However, he was satisfied with neither his level of education nor the job he was doing. During this period, Bahadur Huseynov's elder brother Ahmad was receiving an education in Kharkov and invited Bahadur to join him and further his own education, an offer that Bahadur accepted in May 1939 when he moved to Kharkov.

=== Education ===
In 1939, he was accepted into the foundation course in Institute of Electrotechnics in Kharkov and, upon completing the course, he continued his education in Kharkov borders school named after F. E. Dzerjinski.

=== Career ===
When World War II commenced, Bahadur completed his education and was then sent to the front as a captain of division in his junior grade lieutenant. He engaged in his first battle in Smolensk within troop 908 of division 246 in 1941. Jr. Lieutenant B. Huseynov was severely wounded three times during the bloody face-to-face battle. After being treated in Gorki city, he was sent to the lines of the back-up army located in Georgia so that he could be sent on to the frontier. However, the brigade commands did not accept Bahadur's mobilization to the frontier upon learning that he graduated from border school, and instead allocated him to the Border Service Army located at Georgia.

Huseynov served from 1942 to 1948 as a translator, officer and senior officer in various locations in Georgia, and from 1948 to 1963 he served as a chief of department and reconnaissance chief of department in Border Service Army of division 43 of Azerbaijan Republic. During his time in Azerbaijan, he was accepted into the Law faculty of Azerbaijan State University (currently Baku State University) in 1961 and graduated in 1967 without leaving his service at army.

From 1948 to 1960 he was promoted to the rank of Lieutenant Colonel and was appointed to the deputy of head in military unit where he was serving. In 1963, while serving in a Border Service Army, Azerbaijani Lieutenant Colonel B. Huseynov was highly respected for both his interest in his job and his attitude; two traits which were noticed by leader Haydar Aliyev. He was brought to the State Safety Committee and was later appointed as a head of the department by Aliyev. In 1969, Bahadur Huseynov was sent to the State Safety Committee of Nakhchivan Autonomous Republic as a chairman to continue his career in special governmental services in the positions of operating attorney, chief operating attorney and head of department.

After serving with honour in the position for 7 years, Huseynov became a modest public figure and well-known militant in the republic due to his dignified service. In 1976, Colonel Bahadur Huseynov was appointed as a deputy chairman to the Azerbaijan SSC on the suggestion of Haydar Aliyev and the Azerbaijan CP CC (Communist Party Central Committee). This appointment was related to the great trust ex-president Haydar Aliyev had in him due to his hard work, bravery, respect for the people, and appreciation of others with a similar work ethic. In 1978, Huseynov was promoted to the Brigadier General rank before retiring in 1986.

During the servicing years, he was selected as the Deputy for Goytepe village council, Jalilabad village hard-working deputies council, Nakhchivan Autonomous Republic supreme council, was appointed as a representative of Azerbaijan CP assemblies, and became a member of Baku city Party Committee. During 1991-2001, he was a member of the presidium of relations council in the veterans organization of the CIS (Commonwealth of Independent States) countries. Azerbaijan veterans organization became a part of Worldwide Veterans Federation on initiative of Bahadur, who became the organization's first Azerbaijani member.

=== Awards and Accolades ===
For his contributions to the government and military, Huseynov was twice named to the "Girmizi Emek Bayragi" order, attained degrees I and II of the "Veten Muharibesi" order, and was awarded nearly 30 medals (two for distinction in battles, "G.K.Jukov" and "Distinction in defense of State borders" medals, among others). In 1981, General Secretary of Communist Party of Soviet Union Leonid Brezhnev gifted Huseynov a watch bearing his signature. Huseynov was also granted the "Thanksgiving" award from the executive secretary of the Executive Committee of CIS countries due to his active international participation among war veterans.

Huseynov was also named Honored Lawyer of Azerbaijan Republic and honorable Chekist of the former USSR. Additionally, he was awarded with Mongolia Republic Nation sign, two times to the honorable order of Azerbaijan Republic and three times to the Nakhchivan AR, due to his achieved results and active contribution into the socio-political life of the Republic. In addition, prestigious recognitions of SSC (State Safety Committee) of USSR head department of Borders Army and SSC of Azerbaijan were given to Bahadur for his special contribution.

He was one of the creators of Veterans Organization in Republic and worked in the positions of responsibility such as secretary, deputy chairman of the board, and from 1992 to 2001 as a chairman of the board in Veterans Council. Huseynov died on 31 December 2016 in Baku, Azerbaijan.

=== Family ===
Bahadur Huseynov's family included three children and seven grandchildren.

== See also ==
World War II
