= Qəhrəmanlı, Barda =

Coordinates: 40.459°N 47.081°E

Qəhrəmanlı is a village and municipality in the Barda Rayon of Azerbaijan. In 2008, it was said to have had a population of 472.
