= Suleyman Aliyarli =

Azerbaijani historian

- Born: Suleyman Aliyarli; 18 December 1930; Shahsevan, Beylagan, Azerbaijan
- Died: 16 January 2014 (aged 83); Baku, Azerbaijan
- Occupation: Historian
- Known for: Writing History of Azerbaijan

Suleyman Aliyarli (Azerbaijani: Süleyman Sərdar oğlu Əliyarlı; 18 December 1930 – 16 January 2014) was an Azerbaijani historian, who wrote on a wide range of topics regarding the History of Azerbaijan; Professor of History at Baku State University.

== Life ==
Suleyman Aliyarli was born in Shahseven village of Beylagan District of Azerbaijan to Dilshad and Serdar Aliyarov and spent his childhood there. His father, Serdar was a farmer. He lived most of his life in Baku and continued to teach until his death. He was survived by his two children, Dilshad Aliyarli, an international broadcaster by VOA Azerbaijani Service, and Rashad; and his five grandchildren Sezen Ismayilbeyli, William Horowitz, Dennis Horowitz, Suleyman Aliyarli, and Banu Aliyarli.

== Education ==
Aliyarli graduated from village high school, being taught in Azerbaijani. He then continued his education at Moscow State University Department of History. He successfully graduated from Moscow State University in 1954. In 1962 he defended his PhD thesis "The situation of the Baku Proletariat" and in 1975 his habilitation "Monopolies of the oil industry of Azerbaijan".

== Career ==
In 1978–2001 he was the head of the Department of History of Azerbaijan. In 1993 he was awarded the name "Honored Scholar Figure" by President of Azerbaijan Abulfaz Elchibey. He was a member of the presidium of Supreme Attestation Commission under President of Republic of Azerbaijan during 1992–2001. He was one of the editorial board members and author of "The Turks" encyclopedic work published in Turkish and English (Ankara 2006).

== Bibliography ==
- Tariximiz açıqlanmamış mövzuları ilə. Bakı, Mütərcim, 2012
- Korkut kitabı ve eski Türk Tarihi (Atilla tarihinin izleri)-"Türk Dastanlari..." kitabında, Kafkas Universitesi, Bakı, 2004
- M.Ə.Rəsulzadə və tarix-"M.Ə.Rəsulzadə və ictimai-siyasi ideallar" kitabında, Xəzər Universitesi, 2004
- M.E. Resulzade tarihsel bakışları ile: bir kez daha türklük davası üzerine –XV Türk Tarih Konqresi Bildiri özetleri, TTK Yayınevi, Ankara 2006
- Prof. Dr. Osman F.Sertkaya, Dede Korkut Kitabı (Metnin Transkripsionu ve Açıklama notları) kitabı haqqında- "Türkiyat Araştırmaları Dergisi", sayı 21, Konya, 2007
- Etnogenezis və sonuncu çoxcildli akademik nəşr "Tarix və onun probleməri", No.3 əlavə, Bakı, 2007 M.Emin Resulzade gözüyle Türklük Davasi – "TDAV Tarih Dergisi", sayı 252, istanbul, 2007
- Монополистический капитал в нефтяной промышленности России. 1914–1917. Документы, материалы. "Наука", Ленинград, 1973 (коллектив)
- Нефтяные монополии в Азербайджане в период первый мировой войны. АТУ, Баку, 1974
- К проблеме этногенеза азербайджанского народа. "Элм" АН Азерб., Баку, 1984 (коллектив)
- Azərbaycan tarixi üzrə qaynaqlar. ADU nəşr., Bakı, 1989; 2-ci nəşri, 2007
- Bergland Karabagh/ Utopien und Wahrheiten, Ankara, 1989
- Azərbaycan tarixi Uzaq keçmişdən 1870-ci illərə qədər. "Azərbaycan" nəşr, Bakı, 1996 (müəlliflər heyəti və elmi redaktor)
- Transcancasian Boundaries. Edited bu John F.R. Wright, Suzanne Goldenberg, Ricard Schofield. Geopolitics and International Boundaries Research Centre School of oriental and African Studies University of London, 1996 (chapter VI)
