= Beylagan District =

District in central Azerbaijan

Coordinates: 39°46′N 47°37′E

- District
- Map of Azerbaijan showing Beylagan District
- Country: Azerbaijan
- Region: Mil-Mughan
- Established: 24 November 1939
- Capital: Beylagan
- Settlements: 42

Government
  - Governor: Aziz Azizov

Area
  - Total: 1,130 km^{2} (440 sq mi)

Population (2020)
  - Total: 99,500
  - Density: 88.1/km^{2} (228/sq mi)
- Time zone: UTC+4 (AZT)
- Postal code: 1200
- Website: beyleqan-ih.gov.az

Beylagan District (Azerbaijani: Beyləqan rayonu) is one of the 67 districts of Azerbaijan. It is located in the centre of the country and belongs to the Mil-Mughan Economic Region. It borders the districts of Fuzuli, Aghjabadi, Zardab, Imishli, and the Ardabil Province of Iran. Its capital and largest city is Beylagan. As of 2020, the district had a population of 99,500.

== Etymology ==
The name Beylagan historically used in different forms particularly, Paytakaran, Balasakan, Bilgan, Millar and Beylagan. A number of considerations are associated with the toponymy of Beylagan. In accordance with the historical name "Beylagan" derived from the words "pila" (valley) and "gan" (place) and corresponds to the meaning of field or valley.

Another view claims that Beylagan was historically situated on the Barda–Ardabil trade way. Because of that reason, the city became one of the main trade centres in the 9th – 12th centuries. The toponymy "Beylagan" interrelated to that historical base, which means trade way or the place where trading took place. According to the other statements, the toponymy is related to the name of the "bel" tribe who lived there at that time. "Beylagan" thus means the place where "bel" tribes are settled, according to that view.

== History ==
There is mention of the name of the district in various historical books. One of the "Roads and Countries" is written by Naila Valikhanli. Dimensions of the main historical trade ways are indicated in that book. At the same time, an indication of the route from Greece to Beylagan shows the significance of the city. According to the sources, the north–south line (Derbent – Ardabil road) of the Silk Road passed through Beylagan. Traders of the city built relations with China, India, Iran, Georgia and Byzantium through thanks to this geophysical condition.

In accordance with the historical sources, Beylagan was founded in the 5th century. In the 13th century, the city was completely destroyed by Mongol invasions. Reconstruction of Beylagan started by Amir Teymur in the 14th century but after his death works in that territory stopped. Ancient Beylagan city was ruined in the 16th century and has never been restored again.

Beylagan district was founded on November 24, 1939, and was called Zhanov from 1939 to 1963. In 1963, the Beylagan District was liquidated and merged with the Imishli district. The name of the district was renamed Beylagan with regard to the 1989 dated decree of the Supreme Council of Azerbaijan SSR. The Center of the district is Beylagan city where got city status in 1966.

== Geography ==
Beylagan is one of the southwestern districts of Azerbaijan and situated in the Mil valley of the Kur – Araz lowland and in the middle of the Kur and Araz rivers. Geographical coordinates are 39°45’ North latitude and 47°30’ West longitude and bordering Agchabadi, Zardab, Imishli, Fuzuli districts and Iran Islamic Republic in the south-east. Some parts of the Harami plain belong to the district and the northeast part is below the ocean level. More than 40% of the territory is 0 – 100 meters, 25% is 100 – 200 meters and 35% is below 0 meters. Absolute altitude changes between 200 – 250 meters towards Harami plain. Generally, Beylagan is considered a seismic active zone.

The territory is completely plain. Relief is covered by sand, gravel and other sedimentary rocks belong to the Anthropogenic period of the Cenozoic era. 4th-period sedimentary rocks are widespread in the district. At the same time, all sedimentary minerals are found in the territory. There is found gravel, sand in the Harami and Arazboyu plains. Researches reveal that there are a lot of potable water resources in the Harami plain and they are partly used. Furthermore, the territory is used as a pasture.

=== Climate ===
In the Köppen climate classification, Beylagan has a semi – arid climate with hot summers and mild winters. Geophysical location plays the main role in the formation of the climate. Thus, the area is constantly affected by cyclones and air flows come from tropics and Central Asia. The average annual temperature is 14 °C. January is characterized by an average 1,8 °C and the average temperature is 26 °C in July.

=== Flora and fauna ===
Indigenous flora is characterized by semi-arid plants. The coastal area of the Kur river is covered by poplars, mulberry, cypress trees and tugai forests in a small area.

Gazelle, fox, boar, wolf, grey rabbit are characteristic animals for the district. In the Tugai forests and swamp areas, hedgehogs, wolves, boars, snakes, owls and woodpeckers are found. There are ducks, vessels and seagulls in the ponds.

Several indigenous species of plants and animals are protected in the Ag-Gol National Reserve where located in both Agchabadi and Beylagan districts. There are reserved especially migratory birds.

== Architecture ==
=== Archaeological monuments ===
Archaeological investigations in the district prove that people lived there more than six thousand years ago. There are several monuments registered by the Ministry of Culture and Tourism of Azerbaijan. They are Orangala (relicts of the ancient Beylagan city), Chardakli, Kultapa, Qaratapa, Saritapa, Chataltapa, Garaytapa, Tazakand, the first and second Sultanbud settlements, Saritapa, Sultanbud cemeteries and Beylagan tower.

=== Religious architecture ===
Beylagan is the only district in Azerbaijan where the tomb of Prophet Charchis is situated. The tomb was built in the 17th – 18th centuries. Nowadays the tomb of Prophet Charchis is used as a religious sanctuary and people come there from various countries especially, Iran, Georgia and Middle East countries. There is also a mosque named after Prophet Charchis. Other mosques are Dunyamallar, Amina Khatun and Turkish mosques in the district.

Furthermore, there are some sanctuaries of sayyids such as Sayyid Aga, Sayyid Khirda, Sayyid Miryusif and Sayyid Ali Aga in Beylagan.

=== Statues ===
There are a lot of statues in the district. Most of these statues are historical and notable people; Akif Akberov (National Hero of Azerbaijan), Garay Asedov (Hero of the Soviet Union), Hazi Aslanov (Hero of the Soviet Union), Nariman Narimanov (politician), Ilham Guliyev, Ilqar Gurbanov, Gadim Aliyev, Mehdi Mehdizadeh, Namig Allahverdiyev, Nazim Guliyev and Sevil Gaziyeva.

=== Monuments ===
A list of important monuments of Beylagan includes the Labor Union monument, the March 31, Genocide monument complex of Azerbaijanis, the monument complex in memory of Karabakh war, the monument in memory of the Hero of Soviet Union Garay Asadov and the monument of Heydar Aliyev.

== Economy ==
Economy of Beylagan is characterized by agricultural activities especially cotton, vine, grain growing fields.

== Demography ==
According to the statistics in 2017, the population is 96.4 thousand people. The population of the district includes various nationalities.

Nationalities	Percent
Azerbaijanis	97,53
Turkish people	2,36
Russians	0,05
Tatars	0,03
Talishes	0,01
Ukrainians	0,00
Other nations	0,02

People's settlement in urban areas is less than villages, respectively 42.16% and 57.84%.

According to the State Statistics Committee, as of 2018, the population of the city recorded 97,500 persons, which increased by 18,700 persons (about 18.9 percent) from 79,000 persons in 2000. Of the total population, 49,400 are men and 48,100 are women.

The population of the district by the year (at the beginning of the year, thsd. persons)
Region	2000	2001	2002	2003	2004	2005	2006	2007	2008	2009	2010	2011	2012	2013	2014	2015	2016	2017	2018	2019	2020	2021
Beylagan region	79,0	79,5	79,9	80,3	80,9	81,7	82,4	83,6	84,7	85,9	87,1	87,9	89,7	91,1	92,4	93,7	95,0	96,4	97,5	98,6	99,5	100,0
urban population	15,8	15,9	15,9	16,0	21,6	22,4	25,8	25,9	35,8	36,3	36,7	36,9	37,3	37,8	38,3	38,7	39,3	39,8	40,2	40,6	41,0	41,1
rural population	63,2	63,6	64,0	64,3	59,3	59,3	56,6	57,7	48,9	49,6	50,4	51,0	52,4	53,3	54,1	55,0	55,7	56,6	57,3	58,0	58,5	58,9

== Notable people from Beylagan region ==
Some of the district's notable residents include:

=== Historical figures ===
- Masud ibn Namndar

=== Scientists ===
- Suleyman Aliyarli

=== Military ===
- Garay Asadov
- Bahadur Huseynov

=== Sportspeople ===
- Zulfiyya Huseynova
- Shahin Diniyev
- Eldaniz Azizli
