= Kingdom of Kapank =

- ca 9th century?–12th century?
- The Kingdom of Kapank, shown here as Maskat, in 1060.
- Status: Christian state
- Capital: Khachmaz?
- Common languages: Silvii languages, Armenian(liturgical and literary language), Iranian, other Northeast Caucasian languages
- Religion: Armenian Apostolic Church(Catholicosate of Aghvank)
- Government: Kingdom
- History
  - Established: ca 9th century?
  - Disestablished: 12th century?

Kapank was a medieval Christian state which lasted from the 9th or 10th century to the 12th century in the region of Quba-Khachmaz in modern Azerbaijan extending to the lands of Derbend.

== History ==
Kapank is believed to have been an Caucasian Albanian successor state that arose in the regions of modern Northeast Azerbaijan in the territory of Quba-Khachmaz. Its existence was recounted by the medieval historian Matthew of Edessa in his chronicle in which he also listed the names of the succession of monarchs of the Kingdom. Besides the Kingdom of Hereti this was the second Caucasian Albanian successor state that arose in Shirvan. The location in early medieval history was known as Mazkut or the land of the indigenous Silvii Caucasian peoples who adhered to the Armeno-Albanian church as one of the main distinct nations within the church known as the Chola named after their capital near Derbend. The origins of the Kingdom are unknown however it likely arose as an autonomous state with the weakening of Arab rule in much of the South Caucasus.

Not much is known about the kingdom and its eventual fate and the last account given about the kingdom was from Matthew of Edessa who explained that as of his writing the Kingdom still existed and was ruled by King Grigor. It was likely conquered by the Shirvanshah kingdom at some point in the 12th or 13th centuries.

The Christian population dwindled to about a dozen surviving Christian villages by the 18th century who lost their original Caucasian dialects and identified as Armenians through religion but spoke the Iranian Tat language. Termed as the Armeno-Tats they inhabited the villages of Kilvar, Ulvar, Baraxum, Khachmaz, Qaracally, Talabi among others. After the Dagestani raids into Shirvan the number declined to the two villages of Kilvar and Khachmaz by the 19th century.

The institutional memory of the Kingdom was seemingly kept alive by the Armeno-Tat inhabitants of Khachmaz village in the 19th century, Travelers such as Bishop Makar noted that the Tombs of the medieval Kings of Kapank were located in Khachmaz along with other ancient graves and the village inhabitants venerated King Senekerim especially in annual remembrance ceremonies. Since the tombs of the Kings were located in Khachmaz it can be suggested to have been the likely political center of the medieval kingdom.

== List of monarchs ==
Matthew of Edessa narrated the list of Monarchs. "There were, besides, other kings of the Armenians in the land of Darband which is called Kapank', which borders the Ozes and Aghuans, who are pure and of blessed faith and who are mentioned in the holy mass along with other pious and blessed kings. They are named Vajagan and his son, Goshaktak; Goshaktak's son, P'ilipe'; P'ilipe's son, Goshaktak; P'ilipe's son, Sewada; Senek'erim, son of Sewada; Grigor, son of Senekerim, who is still alive while we write this book of ours."
