= Armenian–Azerbaijani cultural relations =

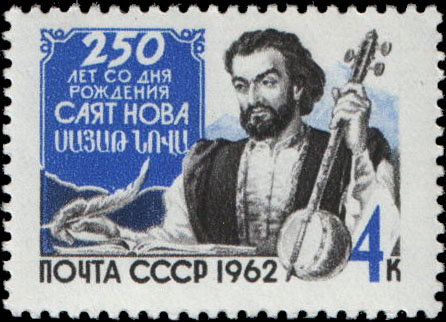
Armenian ashug Sayat-Nova

Armenian-Azerbaijani cultural relations are relations between two ethnic groups in terms of their language and culture.

== Language ==
=== Knowledge of Azerbaijani ===
Azerbaijani was spoken among Tat-speaking Armenian communities along with the Tat language. The Armenian population of Kohna Khachmaz and Garajally was bilingual in Tat and Azeri. Armeno-Tats of Kilvar were often bilingual in Tat and Azeri and historically used the latter to communicate with Armenian-speaking Armenians as late as in 1912. The Iranian scholar B.V. Miller noted that back in 1912 an Armenian priest who did not know the Tat language was forced to preach sermons in Azerbaijani as it was more understandable for the "Armenian-Tat" population of the village Kilvar.

=== Azerbaijani and Turkish loanwords in Armenian and Armenian loanwords in Azerbaijani and Turkish ===
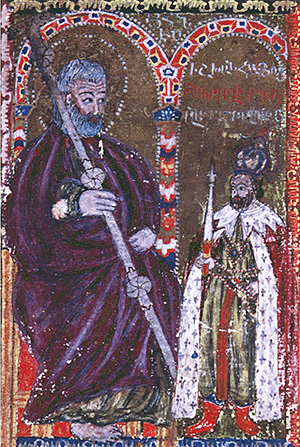
Hovhannes Erznkatsi and Prince Aploch

In 1995 Robert Dankoff released his book “Armenian Loanwords in Turkish” in which he established a corpus of 806 Armenian loanwords in Turkish (defining “Turkish” as the dialect continuum stretching from the Balkans to Azerbaijan). The book also shows phonological borrowings from Armenian and Armenian dialects into Turkish/Azerbaijani.

In the book "Relations of Peter the Great with the Armenian People", commenting on Armenian documents, G.A. Ezov noted that the documents were "written, for the most part, in the spoken Armenian language, using many Tatar words", and they can be used as materials for the study of dialects of Armenian language.

In his 1902 book "The Turkish Loan Words in Armenian", the Armenian linguist and etymologist Hrachia Acharian listed loanwords from the Constantinople, Van, Nor Nakhichevan and Karabakh dialects, which were borrowed from the Turkic languages.

According to the linguist and turkologist E.V. Sevortyan, some loanwords of Turkic origin are found in the works of Hovhannes Erznkatsi. As examples of these, Sevortyan includes "verurem" (English: "I give") and "aldurmush (English: "I was (already) forced to take"), which are found in one of the couplets of the poem "The son of a priest or the daughter of a mullah". Sevortyan also mentions "yeri, yeri" (English: "to walk or move") in Turkish, Azerbaijani as well as other Oghuz Turkic languages, and, possibly, "ayıb" (English: "shame, lack").

== Literature ==
=== Folk and ashug poetry ===
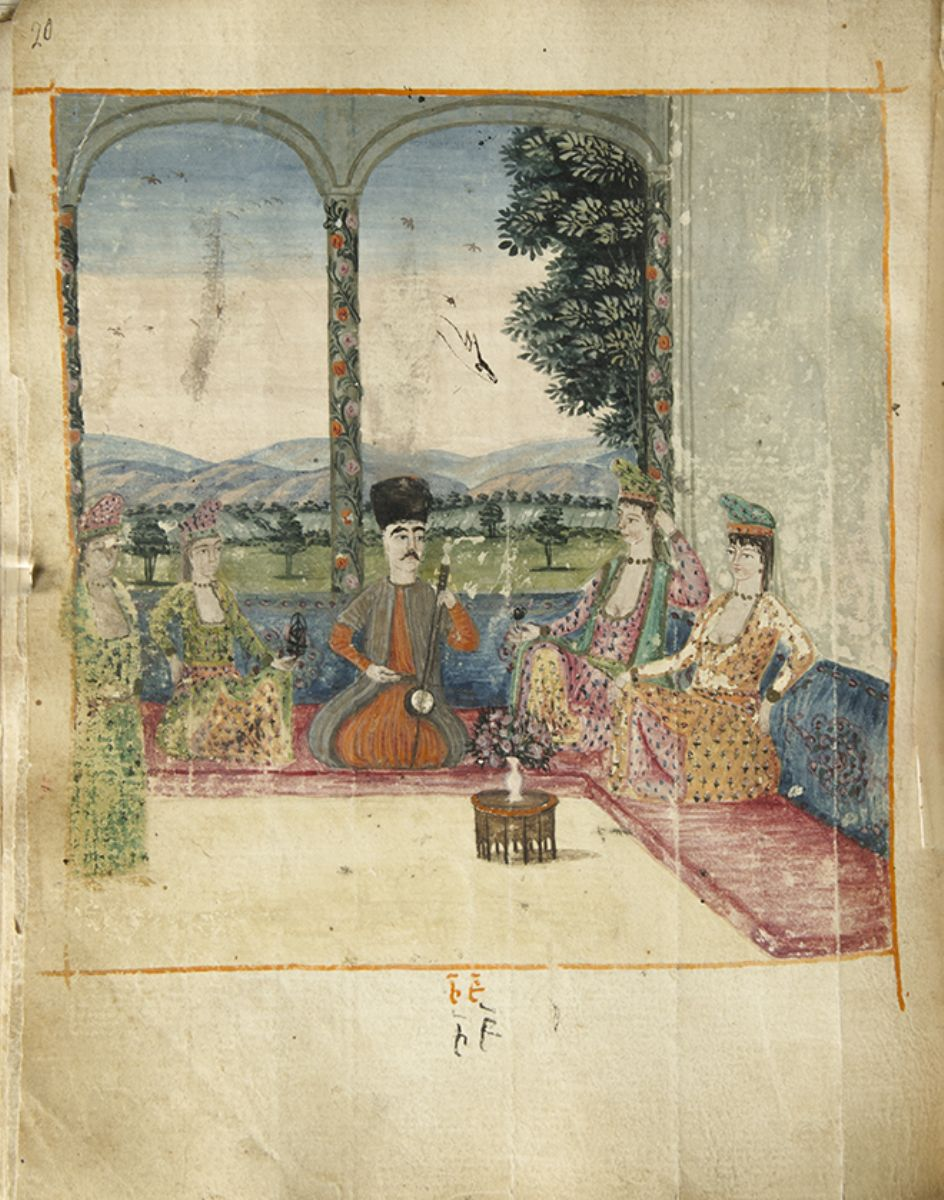
Naghash Hovnatan

Hayren, an Armenian poetic genre has many similarities with Bayati and probably inspired it according to Armenian scientist M.Abeghyan. Vesfi-hal, Azeri genre of bayati related to fortune-telling has similarities with Armenian "can-gulum" in relation to how rituals performed and the volume of poems. Khachatur Abovian, Perch Proshian and Ghazaros Aghayan said that they used can-gulum and other forms of ashug poetry performed in Armenian and Azerbaijani folk ceremonies.

Ekber Yerevanli collected Armenian and Azerbaijani fairy tales. He found many similarities between Azerbaijani and Shakamakhi Armenian fairy tales. Few Armenian stories had similarities to Azerbaijani and Turkish epics such as Kerem and Aslı, Ashiq Qarib and the Epic of Koroghlu. The Armenian epic David of Sassoun has many similarities with the Epic of Koroghlu.

A few Armenian and Azerbaijani ashugs wrote both in Armenian and Azerbaijani languages. Famous examples include Horomsime Akuletsi, Miran, Seyyad, Miskin Burcu, Hpvakim Markaryan and Shirin. The ustadnameh that Slave Artun was so good that it was included to Azerbaijani epics. According to Hummet Alizade, the first ustadnameh of epic "Novruz" and the second ustadnameh of epic "Tahir and Zohre" belonged to him. Dellek Murad, ashug of 17th century wrote qoshma, ustadnameh and qifilbends in Azerbaijani. He was considered ustad (master). Armenian ashug Naghash Hovnatan wrote the Armenian poem "Mayilem" which was popular among the Tatars(Azeris and other Turkic ethnic groups of the region).

Armenian ashug Sayat-Nova although many of his poems have been lost wrote 115 poems in Azeri and helped in the development of the Azerbaijani literature additionally to Georgian literature and his native Armenian literature. In addition, there is a poem where quatrains in Azerbaijani are intertwined with quatrains in Armenian, Persian and Georgian. It is possible that Sayat-Nova performed his songs in the Armenian, Azerbaijani, Georgian and Persian language in public, in and outside Tiflis and Telavi He continued Transcaucasian ashugs' tradition of writing in Karapapakh, Azeri, Armenian and Georgian which was well understood by Eastern Armenians and North Azerbaijanis.

=== Modern literature ===
In 1956, the Azerbaijani poet Mammed Rahim wrote the poem “Sayat-Nova”, in which he reimagined the last days of Armenian ashug Sayat-Nova and his tragic death.

Inspired by the Armeno-Turkish Alphabet an Armeno-Azerbaijani Alphabet where Armenian letters are used to write the Azerbaijani language named Ermənbası(Երմէնբասը) exists.

== Music ==
Armenian music is played among Azerbaijanis who adopted the Duduk, Zurna, Shvi and Sring. Azerbaijanis also have adopted the Armenian music genre of rabiz and many consider the Armenian vipasans who transformed into the gusans as the predecessors of the ashugs and ashug music which is widely popular in Azerbaijan. But likewise Azeri music is played among the Armenians, who have adopted the system of mugham and the instrument Azerbaijani Tar. In the 1890s Sadigjan founded a musical ensemble which included prominent folk singers and musicians performing Azeri, Armenian and Georgian folk songs. Two girls participating in ensemble performed Armenian, Azerbaijani and Georgian dances.

Azerbaijani mugham singer Sattar skillfully performed Armenian and Georgian songs contributing to Armenian and Georgian literature. In a little-known note (Poems. SPb., 1855, p. VII, note) about Sattar, Polonsky says:

Sattar can be heard at Georgian and Armenian weddings, where he is accompanied by musicians. He is accompanied by ... his ... screams, striking the ears of a European with their novelty, giving rise to a strange, disturbing feeling in the soul.

The duduk, a folk instrument of Armenian origins is also present in Azerbaijani music.

=== Dance ===
The place of origin for the dance Uzundara is often believed to be Nagorno-Karabakh (also known as Artsakh). In the collection "Azerbaijani folk dances" it is suggested that the Uzundara dance spread among the Karabakh Armenians as a result of living in close proximity to the Azerbaijanis. In turn, the Azerbaijani researcher K. Hasanov noted that “the Armenians also claim the authorship of this dance”. A relevant theory suggests that Armenians from Erzerum, brought the song to the Caucasus during the Ruso-Turkish Wars of 1828 making it popular in Eastern Armenia and Azerbaijan.

Ceyrani dance is Azerbaijani and Armenian solo dance. The Armenian version of the dance is widespread in Karabakh and Zangezur.

Mirzayi is an Armenian and Azerbaijani female dance. Traditionally, it is performed in weddings. It can be performed both by women and men. Different Armenian varieties of the dance recorded in Shirak region are also known as Old Mirzayi and Tarakyama-Mirzayi.

Shalakho, Halay and Kochari dances are performed by many nations including Armenians(Shalakho and Kochari originate in Armenia) and Azeris. The Armenian Kochari has been included to the List of Intangible Cultural Heritage in Need of Urgent Safeguarding of UNESCO in 2017. Azerbaijani Kochari along with tenzere has been included to the list of Intangible Cultural Heritage in Need of Urgent Safeguarding of UNESCO in November 2018 as versions of Yalli dance. Azerbaijani dance Yally was influenced by Armenian and Kurdish dances.

== Visual arts ==
There is an opinion about the similarity of statues of horses popular in Azerbaijani, Kurdish and Armenian cemeteries with the custom of putting a stuffed horse over the grave.

According to the Soviet ethnographer S.A.Tokarev, Azerbaijani rugs resemble Armenian ones in many ways. The weavers of Kazakh rugs are probably mostly Azeris, but it is clear that both Armenians and Georgians participated in the production of these rugs. Armenian, Azerbaijani and Dagestani carpets are often grouped as one — Caucasian.

== Theatre ==
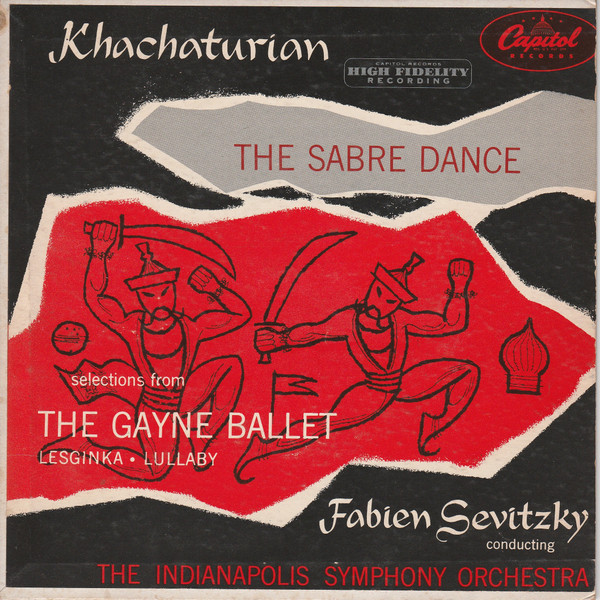
The cover of a 1953 record of "Sabre Dance"

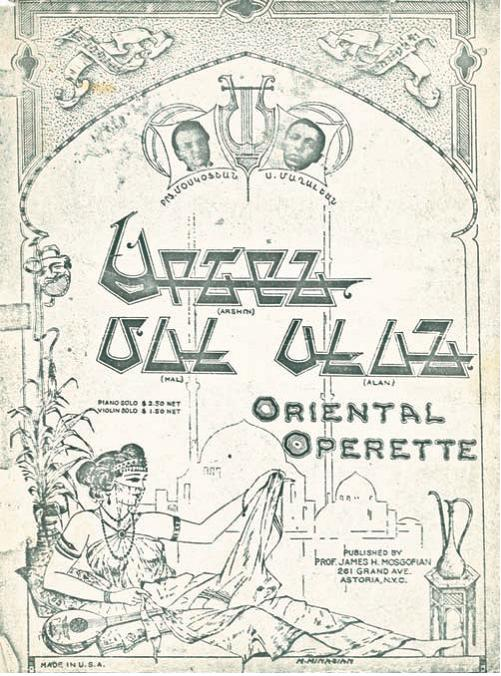
Poster for Arshin Mal Alan released in US in Armenian

The music of Aram Khachaturian (with pieces like sabre dance and gayane which got worldwide fame, they are described as one of the catchiest, most familiar, perhaps most maddening tunes to come out of the 20th century) was very popular in Azerbaijan, before the Azerbaijani government banned his music for being Armenian.

Arshin Mal Alan operetta was translated into many languages including Armenian. Soon after the Baku premiere, the musical comedy is shown throughout the Transcaucasia and Central Asia. In 1916, it was staged in Baku in Armenian. The work was staged in the Armenian language in Tbilisi (1914). Sidrak Magalyan was the translator and musical designer of the production. Later Magalyan played Asker (main character of the comedy) also in Georgian, Azerbaijani and Russian. Armenian composer Aro Stepanyan wrote:

Who else does not know the name of Uzeyir Hajibeyov in Transcaucasia? From an early age, I still remember the stunning success of his popular comedies "Arshin Mal Alan", "Mashadi Ibad" and others, which were staged in all Azerbaijani and Armenian theaters. The melodies of these comedies were sung everywhere, and the performances were a success.

From 1917 to 1922, the Armenian Women's Charitable Society in Tehran regularly organized performances of the operetta "Arshin Mal Alan". They performed it at the Shah's harem, where actresses, specially disguised to play male roles, were carefully checked by eunuchs in order to establish their gender.

From 1923 to 1958, the operetta was staged in almost all of the United States by the cast of the Armenian troupe. It was played on the stages of New York, Philadelphia, Detroit, Chicago, Cleveland, Boston, Racein, Los Angeles, Fresno, San Francisco.

The dance-music for Shalakho which was first arranged and recorded by Armenian composer Nikoghayos Tigranyan was performed in the first Azerbaijani ballet called Maiden Tower and gained nationwide popularity in Azerbaijan.

Koroghlu was staged in Yerevan in 1942.

Kochari, which has been sung and danced by Armenians for a thousand years became one of the most popular dances accompanied by dance music in Azerbaijan, being performed in theatres and weddings throughout Azerbaijan.

== Cinema ==
Arshin Mal Alan operetta was translated into many languages including Armenian. In 1916, it was staged in Baku in the Armenian language. Sidrak Magalyan was the translator and musical designer of the production. Later Magalyan played Asker (main character of the comedy) also in Georgian, Azerbaijani and Russian.

1988 Ashik Kerib film by Dodo Abashidze and Sergei Parajanov was based on an Azerbaijani legend record by Mikhail Lermontov. The music of film was composed by Javanshir Guliyev and performed by Alim Gasimov. Film uses both mugham and ashig music of Azerbaijan. It includes the poetry of Ashig Alasgar, Aşıq Pəri and Aliagha Vahid. Sergei Parajanov also used Azeri poem of Sayat Nova in Arabic script in his The Color of Pomegranates movie.

== Religion ==
Baba-Hadji Mausoleum is Islamic Mausoleum and shared Armenian-Azerbaijani pilgrimage site. Prior to the Nagorno-Karabakh conflict, a mullah occasionally came over from Azerbaijan to lead prayers. Additionally, an Azerbaijani lived permanently near the shrine and collected donations for its upkeep.

== See also ==
- Armeno-Kipchak language
