= Uzunoba =

Uzunoba may refer to:

- Argavand, Armavir, Armenia
- Uzunoba, Aghjabadi, Azerbaijan
- Uzunoba, Khachmaz, Azerbaijan
- Aşağı Uzunoba, Azerbaijan
- Yuxarı Uzunoba, Azerbaijan
