= Armeno-Tats =

Ethnic group of the South Caucasus

Armeno-Tats (Armenian: հայ-թաթեր – hay-tater; Muslim Tat: Армени-Дағли, romanized: Armeni-Daghli) are a distinct group of Christian Tat-speaking Armenians that historically populated eastern parts of the South Caucasus, in what constitutes the modern-day Republic of Azerbaijan. Most scholars researching the Tat language, such as Boris Miller, agree that Armeno-Tats are ethnic Armenians who underwent a language shift and adopted Tat as their first language. This is explained on one hand by the self-identification of Armeno-Tats who stated during Miller's research that they consider themselves Armenian as well as by some linguistic features of their dialect. The Armeno-Tats formerly lived in Madrasa and Kilvar in Azerbaijan, but have almost entirely moved to Armenia and Russia.

== History ==
Adam Olearius travelled through the historical region of Shirvan (present-day central Azerbaijan) in 1637 and mentioned the existence of a community of Armenians in the city of Shamakhi, who "had its own language" but also "spoke Turkic, as did all people in Shirvan". Archaeologist Vladimir Sysoyev, who visited Shamakhi in 1925 and described ruins of a mediaeval Armenian church, held interviews with local residents who dated the first settlement of Armenians in Shamakhi and its vicinities to the late sixteenth or early seventeenth century. Historically mountainous Shirvan was an area of mixed Tat-Azeri settlement with the former slowly assimilating into the latter.

Olearius, Bakikhanov and Miller noted a high rate of assimilation among Shirvan Armenians, with some adopting the Muslim faith and diffusing in the majority (this went on well into the eighteenth century) and others shifting to the Tat language, while remaining Christian. By the early twentieth century, there were only two villages where Tat-speaking Christian Armenians continued to live: Madrasa and Kilvar. With regard to the origin of Armeno-Tats, Miller quotes bishop Mesrop Smbatian in stating that at least some groups of them were eighteenth-century migrants from Karabakh. Armenians of Kilvar claimed descent from medieval migrants from Edessa (present-day Şanlıurfa, Turkey). Comparing southern Tat dialects and Armeno-Tat, Miller concluded that Armenians of Madrasa may have been early migrants from the Absheron Peninsula where the presence of a Christian community was historically attested. Some Armeno-Tats who had earlier switched to Tat as their first language, such as residents of Garajally, went on to switch to Azeri by the end of the eighteenth century.

In 1796, after the Persian Expedition of 1796 led by Valerian Zubov, most residents of Kilvar and Talabi and some residents of Garajally, about 50 families altogether, chose to leave with the troops and founded the village of Edissia (after the city of Edessa where they believed their ancestors had come from) in the present-day Stavropol Krai of Russia. In 1926, they still retained good knowledge of Tat and were referred to by the local population as malakhantsy (from the Tat mal xan, i.e. "of the khan", meaning they were subjects of the Quba Khanate). According to other sources, Armenians of Edissia, along with those living in the suburbs of Kizlyar, spoke a Turkic idiom they referred to as bizimja ("our talk") which they adopted while still in Shirvan.

The remaining Armeno-Tats lived in Madrasa and Kilvar until the First Nagorno-Karabakh War, when they were forced to leave for Armenia. Initially Armenians of Madrasa had planned to undergo a population exchange with the residents of the Azeri-populated village of Shidli in Armenia, but the Spitak earthquake in Armenia which destroyed the village made the plan unrealisable. In 1989, they collectively moved to the Aragatsotn Province of Armenia where they founded the village of Dprevank. There are 6,000 Armenians living in Edissia.

== Language ==
Armeno-Tat
- Madrasa-Tat, Mədrəsə-Tat
- հայ-թաթերեն
- Native to: Armenia, Azerbaijan and Russia
- Region: South Caucasus, North Caucasus and Astrakhan
- Ethnicity: Armeno-Tats
- Language family: Indo-European: Indo-Iranian; Iranian; Western Iranian; Southwestern Iranian; Persian; Tat; Muslim Tat; Armeno-Tat
- Writing system: Armenian

Language codes
- ISO 639-3: None (mis)
- Glottolog: arme1260

Armeno-Tats of Madrasa and Kilvar referred to their language as p'arseren ("Persian"), while Armeno-Tat migrants to the North Caucasus and Astrakhan called it keghetseren ("village talk") and used it within their own community as an in-group language. Armenian researcher Armen Hakobian identifies the eighteenth century as the time when Tat was first mentioned as a mothertongue for some groups of Shirvan Armenians. Boris Miller likened their dialect to central varieties of Muslim Tat, which Armeno-Tat was mutually intelligible with, rather than to Judæo-Tat. Residents of the Absheron villages of Balakhany and Surakhany – considered speakers of southern Muslim Tat – also reported ease at understanding Armeno-Tat.

With the exception of Kohna Khachmaz and the extinct Armenian community of Garajally, where the Armenian population was Azeri-speaking, Armeno-Tats spoke and used Tat to communicate with residents of other Armeno-Tat villages. Armeno-Tats of Kilvar were often bilingual in Tat and Azeri and historically used the latter to communicate with Armenian-speaking Armenians as late as in 1912. The introduction of public education in the early twentieth century led to Armeno-Tats acquiring Armenian, which however they used only in communication with outsider Armenians or as a written language. This process intensified in the Soviet times, leading to Armeno-Tats' almost complete shift from Tat to Armenian by the late 1980s.

The Christian dialect of Tat displays typical Tat rhotacism (mutation of Persian /d/ into /r/), but differs from other Tat dialects in lacking pharyngeal consonants /ʕ/ and /ħ/.

Today the Armeno-Tat dialect is considered nearly extinct, with most Armeno-Tats having switched to Armenian and Russian. In 2002, only 36 Armenians in Russia spoke Tat either as a first or second language. There is an unknown number of speakers in Armenia, all of whom, however, are over 50.

== See also ==
- Tat people (Caucasus)
- Kingdom of Kapank
- Armenians in Azerbaijan
