= Dprevank =

Dprevank Դպրեվանք
- Location within Armenia Location within Aragatsotn
- Coordinates: 40°28′N 43°54′E
- Country: Armenia
- Province: Aragatsotn
- Municipality: Ashtarak

Population (2011)
  - Total: 47
- Time zone: UTC+4
  - Summer (DST): UTC+5

Dprevank (Armenian: Դպրեվանք) is a village in the Ashtarak Municipality of the Aragatsotn Province of Armenia. The village is on the road from Dzoragyugh to Tsakhkasar. The village has been founded in 1991–1992 by Armenian refugees fleeing from Mədrəsə village of Shamakhi District of Azerbaijan.
