= Dzoragyugh =

Dzoragyugh or Dzoragyukh may refer to:

- Dzoragyugh, Gegharkunik, Armenia
- Dzoragyugh, Aragatsotn, Armenia
- Dzoragyugh, Lori, Armenia
