= Pirtikan =

Pirtikan or Pirtikyan may refer to:

- Dzoragyukh, Aragatsotn, Armenia, formerly Nerkin Pirtikan
- Tsakhkasar, Armenia, formerly Verin Pirtikan
