= Sharifoba =

Sharifoba may refer to:

- Şərifoba, Azerbaijan
- Yeni Şərif, Azerbaijan
