= Armeno-Tat =

Armeno-Tat may refer to:

- Armeno-Tats
- Armeno-Tat language
