= Gastronationalism =

Sociopolitical issue

Gastronationalism or culinary nationalism is the use of food and its history, production, control, preparation and consumption as a way of promoting nationalism and national identity. It may involve arguments between two or more regions or countries about whether a particular dish or preparation is claimed by one of those regions or countries and has been appropriated or co-opted by the others.

Gastronationalism has been criticized as an example of banal nationalism.

== Origins and development ==
Atsuko Ichijo and Ronald Ranta have called food "fundamentally political" and "one of the essential commodities with which political powers at various levels are concerned". Food historian Michelle T. King suggests that cuisine is a natural focus for studies of nationalism, pointing out dozens of such treatments over the first decades of the 21st century. She also argues Asia's culinary nationalism has been particularly intense. Examples of gastronationalism include efforts by state bodies, nongovernmental bodies, businesses and business groups, and individuals.

New York University professor Fabio Parasecoli has defined food as an expression of identity. Conflict between two or more regions or countries about whether a particular dish or preparation is claimed by one of those regions or countries and has been appropriated or co-opted by the others is not uncommon, especially in areas where there has been violent conflict. Dishes affected by these culinary wars tend to be those with "a clearly symbolic ethnic significance". They also tend to be dishes that "represent territorial aspirations" and can be developed and prepared only by settled – and therefore indigenous – peoples. Lavash and harissa are wheat-based, therefore cannot have been developed by nomads but only by an agricultural society. Many of the debates center around the idea that a "settled" society – that is, an agricultural rather than nomadic one – is somehow superior, and that claiming a dish only achievable in an agricultural society helps prove the area was agricultural at a certain point. This idea was official policy in the Soviet Union. According to OpenDemocracy, "evidence of ancient agricultural development is cherished by nationalists on both sides."

Mary Douglas said "national food cultures become a blinding fetish which, if disregarded, may be as dangerous as an explosion".

In 2006 researcher Liora Gvion argued that cuisines of poverty – typically, traditional foods – "reveal the inter-connection between the culinary discourse and the political one" and that the issue was tied up with those of access to land and national identity.

Sociologist Michaela DeSoucey in 2010 described the concept of gastronationalism as the use of food and its history, production, control, and consumption as a way of promoting nationalism. According to DeSoucey, gastronationalism uses food to promote a sense of national identity and affects how members of the national community develop "national sentiments and taste preferences for certain foods." She argues that the issues go beyond simple nationalism and involve livelihoods and a "struggle for markets" as the identification of a certain food with a certain area means the ability to sell a food product is affected for those inside or outside the area. She also points out that such arguments are often not intended to reach agreement but instead to raise awareness of the food product and generate interest in obtaining it.

Kingston University's Ranta in 2018 said a group's claims to a particular food become important when a "cause or agenda is behind the claim".

In 2013 Al Jazeera noted that gastronationalism had been an ongoing issue in Armenia, Azerbaijan, and Georgia as each country "vie[d] for the recognition of certain dishes as their own" and was causing tension among neighboring countries with already-troubled relationships.

In 2020 an article published by the Cambridge University Press found that while the concept of gastronationalism had not been fully developed in academia, the scholarship was developing quickly. In 2024 journalist Francesca Barca, writing in Voxeurop, called gastronationalism ' "neither neutral nor harmless, but is an aspect of what is called "banal nationalism",' quoting Gastronationalizmo author Michael Antonio Fino as saying "Gastronationalism is one of the most insidious forms of this 'banal nationalism' because it is met with a certain indulgence, and mistaken for patriotic pride."

=== National cuisine ===
Food historian King differentiates between gastronationalism, or culinary nationalism, and national cuisine, saying that culinary nationalism "suggests a dynamic process of creation and contestation" while national cuisine "calls to mind a specific and static product".

=== Political usage ===
According to Barca, gastronationalism is used as a political symbol for a party or movement's values, and in particular traditional or populist values. She argues "The passage from fork to defence of traditional values is short", quoting Matteo Salvini saying the "defence of our products is a battle of civilisation: in politics everything can be negotiated, but here Made in Italy either is or is not" and called tortellini made without pork an erasure of "our history". According to Fino, "national gastronomic identity becomes an occasion for belonging, opposition to others, a claim to superiority".

When the Czech Republic entered the European Union, controversies developed over traditional Czech foods, such as the Czech style of goulash, which traditionally is allowed to rest unchilled overnight before serving, a step forbidden in commercial production by European Union food-handling rules; pomazánkové máslo, which in Czech is "spread butter" but which by EU standards has a fat content too low to be called butter; and the Czech style of rum, which because it is potato-based cannot be called rum under EU rules; conservative politicians objected that entering the EU was removing these foods from traditional cuisine.

According to Boróka Parászka, writing in Hvg, Hungarian politicians regularly use food to "invoke identity", citing as an example Hungarian Prime Minister Viktor Orbán's frequent discussion and images of cooking and food in his communications.

== Governmental and non-governmental bodies ==
=== Codex Alimentarius Commission ===
The Codex Alimentarius Commission is a project of the Food and Agriculture Organization and the World Health Organization which creates advice regarding food handling, labeling, and ethical standards, including those around marketing a food as originating in a certain place.

=== Intangible Cultural Heritage designation ===
In some cases United Nations Educational, Scientific and Cultural Organization (UNESCO) has made statements favoring one side or the other of such an argument, sometimes after being asked to name a food to a UNESCO Intangible Cultural Heritage list for a country, which has increased passions on either side. In 1972 UNESCO adopted the Convention Concerning the Protection of the World Cultural and Natural Heritage or World Heritage Convention.

=== Protected Geographical Status ===
In Europe, mandatory origin labeling is "one of the most prickly topics" in European Union (EU) policy discussions. In December 2019 France, Greece, Italy, Portugal and Spain asked the EU to strengthen food origin labeling; Politico called the request a "bombshell", as it weakens the idea of a single market. The Protected Geographical Status as of 2016 had been applied to over a thousand food items. Fino calls such protections "a powerful tool in the hands of member countries to feed nationalism".

=== Examples ===
Azerbaijan's National Culinary Centre, a non-governmental organization (NGO) publishes information discussing Azerbaijan's national cuisine and accusing Armenian cuisine of imitating Azerbaijan. Armenia's Society for the Preservation and Development of Armenian Culinary Traditions, an academic body, has discussed the Armenian culinary tradition.

During the hummus wars, multiple corporations and business groups became involved as part of their marketing campaigns.

== Notable examples ==
=== Arepas ===
Colombia and Venezuela have a "heated and longstanding rivalry" over the origins of the arepa. The dish is a staple of both cuisines. Venezuelan president Nicolás Maduro "has tried to use arepas as a nationalist rallying point, if not a political tool, claiming the food is from his country alone", according to the New York Times. According to food anthropologist Ocarina Castillo of the Central University of Venezuela, the dish is likely thousands of years old and originated in the region now occupied by the two countries before colonizers of the area drew borders.

=== Borscht ===
Borscht is believed to have originated in Kievan Rus' and specifically in the area of modern-day Ukraine, but according to historian Alison K. Smith, the dish's "Ukrainian origins have been largely obscured" as it became ubiquitous in Russian cuisine.

The dish was described in Sergei Drukovtsov's Cooking Notes (1779), but is believed to have entered popular Russian cuisine from the popular 1939 Soviet cookbook Book of Tasty and Healthy Food that included dishes from various cuisines of the USSR's member states. The state-sponsored cookbook was created by Commissar of Food Anastas Mikoyan in a conscious attempt at creating a Soviet national cuisine for nation-building purposes.

In 2019, the official Twitter account of Ministry of Foreign Affairs of the Russian Federation referred to borscht as "one of Russia's most famous & beloved #dishes & a symbol of traditional cuisine" in one of their tweets, sparking outrage in Ukraine, where it was widely seen as an attempt at cultural appropriation.

In response, Ukraine applied for the inclusion of borscht in the UNESCO Intangible Cultural Heritage List and launched a five-year culinary diplomacy strategy dubbed 'borsch diplomacy' where borscht plays a central role. UNESCO added the soup to the organization's list for Ukraine in 2020.

Shortly after the 2022 Russian invasion of Ukraine, Russian Foreign Ministry spokesperson Maria Zakharova said the fact Ukrainians "didn't want to share borscht" was an example of alleged "xenophobia, Nazism, extremism in all forms" that led to the invasion. Shortly after, UNESCO added "Culture of Ukrainian borscht cooking" to the List of Intangible Cultural Heritage in Need of Urgent Safeguarding, citing the invasion. According to The Smithsonian, "The designation by the international cultural authority was widely seen as a landmark decision in the ongoing cultural dispute between the two countries on borshch’s true country of origin."

=== Chinese cuisine ===
Taiwan has presented Taiwanese cuisine as the only remnant of traditional Chinese culture and cuisine, which the Nationalist Party argued had "been destroyed on the Chinese Mainland after the Communist takeover". On the other hand, some Taiwanese object to the politically fraught inclusion of Taiwanese cuisine under the banner of regional Chinese cuisine and argue that it is "inaccurate".

In 2011, the Michelin Green Guide to Taiwan attributed the origins of minced pork rice to Shandong. This led to a fierce debate in Taiwan with many people insisting that minced pork rice originated in Taiwan, while others viewed it as a Shandong dish that simply caught on in Taiwan.

Shanghainese people have criticized the Taiwanese restaurant chain Din Tai Fung of misrepresenting the xiao long bao as a Taiwanese dish.

In October 2020, a Japanese bakery c'est très fou launched the product "Taiwanese pineapple bun", which received criticism from Hong Kongers for suggesting the product originated in Taiwan.

=== Dolma ===
Dolma or tolma is claimed by both Armenia and Azerbaijan. Armenia holds an annual tolma festival, always at a site that has historical significance in its conflicts with Azerbaijan.

=== Gallo pinto ===
Both Nicaragua and Costa Rica claim gallo pinto as their own, and the dish's origin is a point of contention between the two countries. The competition between the two countries over ownership of the dish is sometimes referred to as the "Gallo Pinto War".

=== Falafel ===
Falafel is argued over by Israel and various Arab states; according to Jennie Ebeling, writing in the Review of Middle East Studies, the dish "is loaded with issues of national identity". According to Alexander Lee, writing for History Today in 2019, "More often than not, arguments about the origins of falafel are refracted through the lens of political rivalries. Particularly for the Israelis and the Palestinians, ownership of this most distinctively Levantine dish is inexorably bound up with issues of legitimacy and national identity. By claiming falafel for themselves, they are each, in a sense, claiming the land itself – and dismissing the other as an interloper or occupier."

The dish features prominently in Israeli cuisine and has been called a national dish. Some Palestinians and other Arabs have objected to the identification of falafel with Israeli cuisine as amounting to cultural appropriation. Palestinian author Reem Kassis wrote that the food has become a proxy for political conflict. Joseph Massad, a Jordanian-American professor at Columbia University, has called the characterization as Israeli of falafel and other dishes of Levantinian origin in American and European restaurants to be part of a broader issue of appropriation by colonizers.

The dish and its politico-cultural significance were the subject of a 2013 documentary by Ari Cohen, Falafelism: The Politics of Food in the Middle East. According to the Toronto Star, Cohen intended the film to be about "the unifying power of falafel". The earliest documented references to falafel date back to late 19th-century Egypt, following the British occupation in 1882.

In 2002, Concordia University's chapter of Hillel served falafel at an event, prompting accusations of appropriation from a pro-Palestinian student group.

=== Feta ===
Until 1999, the term feta was used only by Greek producers. During the 1990s, Denmark and Germany challenged the labelling, arguing that the word 'feta' was Italian and that other EU countries shared climate and geography with parts of Greece and should be permitted to label their feta-style cheeses as Feta. In 2002 the European Union granted the sole rights to use the name to Greece.

=== Foie gras ===
Foie gras has been protected as a name and signifier of traditional identity by France; conflict is common with animal rights activists.

=== Hainanese chicken rice ===
Hainanese chicken rice is claimed by both Malaysia and Singapore. The conflict dates to 1965, when the two countries split. Both countries claim its origin and accuse the other of having appropriated the dish into their own national cuisine.

=== Harissa ===
Harisa is claimed by both Armenia and Turkey, where it is called keshkek. Keshkek was recognized by UNESCO on its intangible cultural heritage list, which has caused passionate debate, with Armenians arguing that the dish's main ingredient, wheat, indicates it could not have been developed in Turkey, where the tradition was nomadic.

=== Hummus ===
Hummus is argued over by Israel, Palestine, Syria, and Lebanon. The disagreement is sometimes referred to as the "hummus wars". The hummus wars also refers to the creation by Sabra, a US food company, of "the world's largest hummus plate" as a marketing event. Israeli company Osem responded with a larger hummus plate, and soon was followed by a group of Lebanese chefs working with the Association of Lebanese Industrialists's campaign "Hands Off Our Dishes", which claimed hummus as Lebanese and objected to the marketing of the dish as Israeli. Fadi Abboud, then president of ALI and later tourism minister for the country, threatened legal action against Israel for marketing hummus and other commercial food products as Israeli. A series of record-breaking hummus plates followed from various Middle Eastern countries. Abboud characterized the hummus wars as being not about just hummus but about "the organized theft carried out by Israel" in connection to the culture of the entire Arab region.

Various academic theories argue the dish has its origins in Turkey, Syria, Lebanon, or Egypt. However, the earliest mention of Hummus comes from a 13th-century cookbook written by the Syrian historian Ibn al-Adim. The strongest evidence currently points to Syria as the origin of Hummus.

=== Jollof rice ===
West African countries typically have at least one variant form of jollof rice, with Ghana, Nigeria, Sierra Leone, Liberia and Cameroon particularly competitive as to which country makes the best jollof. In the mid-2010s this expanded into the "Jollof Wars".

The rivalry is especially prominent between Nigeria and Ghana. In 2016 Sister Deborah released "Ghana Jollof", which denigrated the Nigerian version and Nigerians for being proud of their version. Soon after, a physical fight over insufficient jollof supplies at a Ghanaian political rally sparked delighted mockings of Ghanaians by Nigerians.

Of particular sensitivity in jollof-making communities is the inclusion of non-traditional ingredients, which are defined country to country and are seen as making the jollof inauthentic. In 2014 a recipe released by Jamie Oliver that included cherry tomatoes, coriander, lemon, and parsley, none of which are used in any traditional recipe, caused outraged reactions to the point Oliver's team had to issue a statement.

=== Kimchi ===
Both South Korea and North Korea claim kimchi. North Korea argues that South Korea's decreasing consumption (and increasing commercialization of production) is proof that the dish is more strongly associated with North Korea. Traditional kimchi-making in South Korea in 2013 was given Intangible Cultural Heritage status by UNESCO and in 2015 in North Korea.

Japan also has interested itself in kimchi, arguing with South Korea over the Codex Alimentarius Commission's (CAC) international standardization of the dish, a disagreement often called the kimchi war. Japan produced and exported an instant version of kimchi, which South Korea argued should not be called kimchi due to the lack of fermentation. During the 1996 Atlanta Olympics, Japan proposed making kimuchi, the Japanese name of the dish, an official food of the Olympics. In 2001 the CAC adopted an international standard which requires fermentation in order for a product to be exported as kimchi.

China has also claimed kimchi, which in China is called pao cai, which is also the name of a similar traditional Sichuanese pickle. In 2020 the International Organization for Standardization (ISO) announced regulations for the Sechuan pao cai. Although the ISO stated in the listing that the regulations did not apply to kimchi, China's state-run Global Times called it "an international standard for the kimchi industry led by China".

South Korea has called out as appropriation both the Japanese and Chinese marketing of the dish.

=== Lavash ===
Lavash is claimed by Armenia, Azerbaijan and Turkey; the Armenians argue that lavash is traditionally prepared in a tonir, which indicates development in a non-nomadic society such as Armenia. Accusations in Armenian media centered around Turkey and Azerbaijan claiming the dish because they wanted to conceal their early nomadic lifestyle.

=== Nasi lemak ===
Nasi lemak is a traditional dish in Southeast Asian cuisine. It is claimed by both Malaysia and Singapore.

=== Shopska salad ===
Shopska salad, which is considered a national dish of Bulgaria, is claimed by Bulgaria, Croatia, Czechia, North Macedonia, and Serbia. Bulgaria requested protected geographical indication from the European Union; Serbia objected.

=== Tortillas ===
During Mexico's tortilla riots in 2007, protesters chanted, "tortillas si, pan no!", expressing their nationalistic objection to replacing tortillas, with which they identified on a nationalistic level, with bread, which they saw as a colonialist introduction.

=== Turkish coffee ===
UNESCO has included Turkish coffee in its list of items of Intangible Cultural Heritage. The style of coffee is also claimed by Greece.

=== Washoku ===
Washoku, a traditional food culture of the Japanese, was in 2013 added to the UNESCO Intangible Cultural Heritage List and in 2017 described by Leiden University's Katarzyna J. Cwiertka as "a myth fabricated for the purpose of Japanese nation-branding". According to Ichijo and Ranta, Japan's efforts to promote Japanese cuisine in other countries is "regarded as a way of increasing export of Japanese agricultural produce and attracting more tourists".

== See also ==
- Gastrodiplomacy
- Gastrotourism
- Politics of food
