= Hacıqazma =

Hajigazma
- Azerbaijani: Hacıqazma
- Location within Azerbaijan
- Coordinates: 41°31′N 48°50′E
- Country: Azerbaijan
- District: Khachmaz
- Municipality: Ahmedoba
- Time zone: UTC+4 (AZT)
  - Summer (DST): UTC+5 (AZT)

Hacıqazma (also, Hajigazma and Hajygazma) is a village in the Khachmaz District of Azerbaijan. The village forms part of the municipality of Ahmedoba.
