= Hacıəhmədoba =

Hajiahmedoba
- Azerbaijani: Hacıəhmədoba
- Location within Azerbaijan
- Coordinates: 41°32′02″N 48°48′41″E
- Country: Azerbaijan
- District: Khachmaz
- Municipality: Ahmedoba
- Time zone: UTC+4 (AZT)
  - Summer (DST): UTC+5 (AZT)

Hacıəhmədoba (also, Hajiahmedoba and Hajyahmedoba) is a village in the Khachmaz District of Azerbaijan. The village forms part of the municipality of Ahmedoba.
