= Xəzərli =

Human settlement in Azerbaijan

Coordinates: 41°34′N 48°51′E

Xəzərli is a village in the municipality of Uzunoba in the Khachmaz Rayon of Azerbaijan.
