= Əhmədoba =

Ahmedoba
- Municipality
- Azerbaijani: Əhmədoba
- Location within Azerbaijan
- Coordinates: 41°31′01″N 48°48′45″E
- Country: Azerbaijan
- District: Khachmaz

Population
  - Total: 1,548
- Time zone: UTC+4 (AZT)
  - Summer (DST): UTC+5 (AZT)

Əhmədoba (also, Ahmedoba) is a village and municipality in the Khachmaz District of Azerbaijan. It has a population of 1,548. The municipality consists of the villages of Ahmedoba, Garajally, Hajiahmedoba, and Hajigazma.
