= Banal nationalism =

Everyday representations of a nation that build a sense of shared national belonging

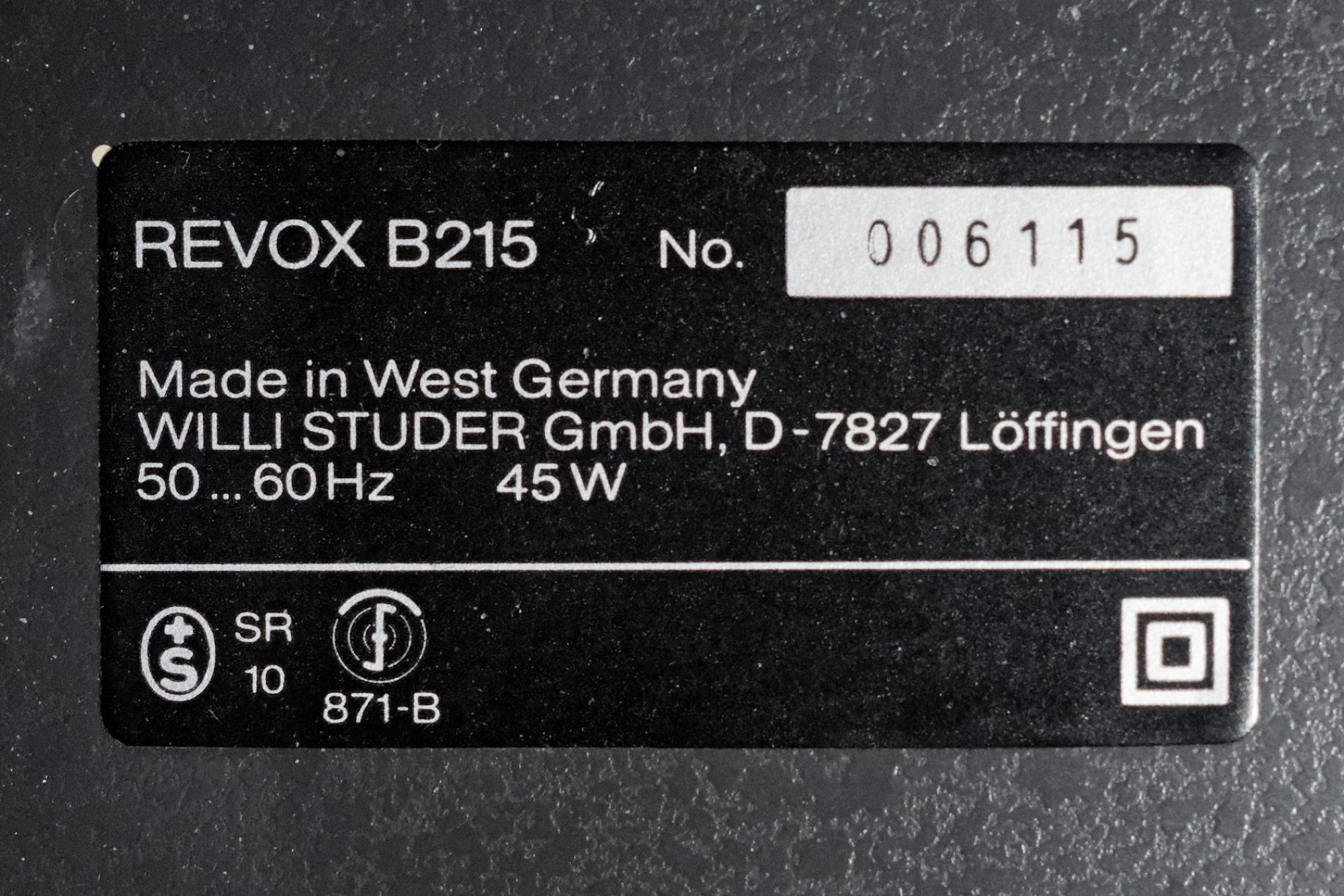
"Made in West Germany" on a cassette deck manufactured in the 1980s. Subtle references to the nation like these can be examples of banal nationalism, instilling a sense of pride through everyday items without overt proclamations of love for one's country.

Banal nationalism refers to everyday representations of a nation, which build a sense of shared national identity. Examples include sports nationalism, the use of flags or national anthems in everyday contexts, and gastronationalism.

== Coining of the term ==
The term is derived from English academic, Michael Billig's 1995 book of the same name and is intended to be understood critically. Billig's book has been described as 'the fourth most cited work on nationalism ever published'. Billig devised the concept of 'banal nationalism' to highlight the routine and often unnoticed ways that established nation states are reproduced from day to day.

== Impact ==
The concept has been highly influential, particularly within the discipline of political geography, with continued academic interest since the book's publication in 1995. Today the term is used primarily in academic discussion of identity formation, geopolitics, and the nature of nationalism in contemporary political culture.

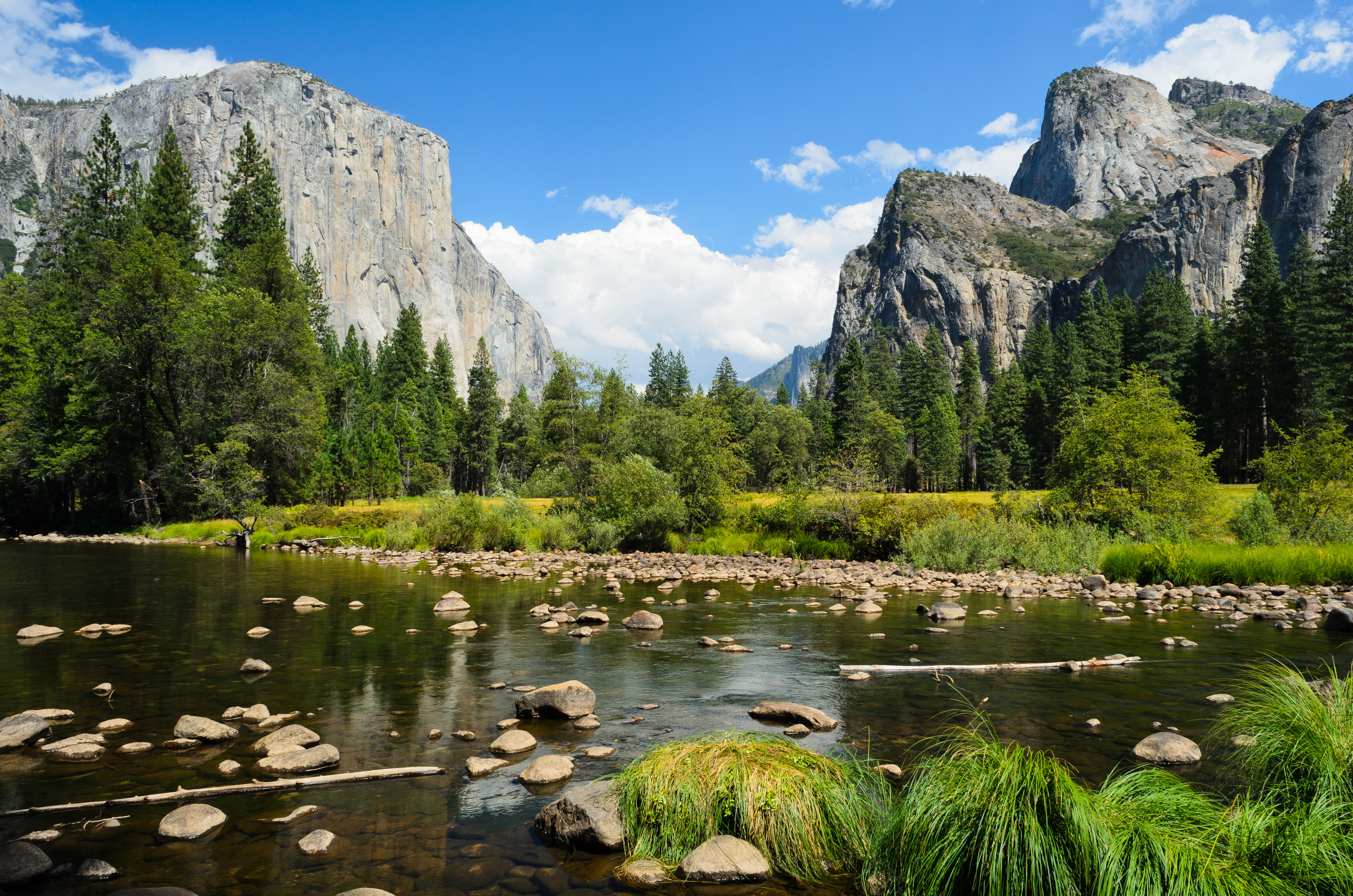
Institutions like Yosemite National Park could be interpreted as an effective form of banal nationalism: an originally natural geographic phenomenon is actively delimited, institutionalized and styled as an item of national importance by political act. This way, the abstract idea of America becomes tangible in ordinary life.

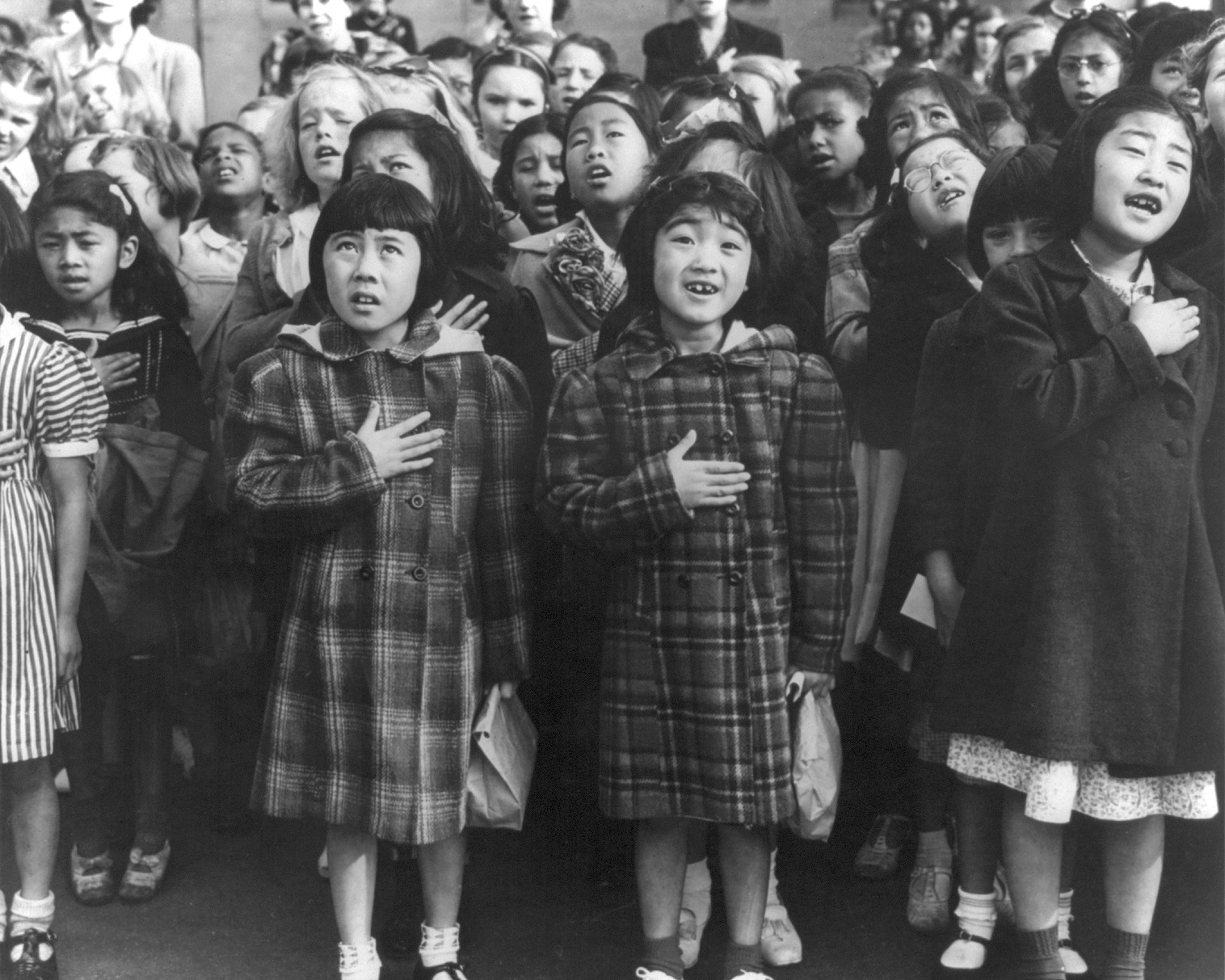
The Pledge of Allegiance in the United States is one of the most overt forms of banal nationalism – most are less obvious.

== Examples ==
Examples of banal nationalism include the use of flags in everyday contexts, sporting events, national songs, symbols on money, popular expressions and turns of phrase, patriotic clubs, the use of implied togetherness in the national press, for example, the use of terms such as the prime minister, the weather, our team, and divisions into "domestic" and "international" news. Many of these symbols are most effective because of their constant repetition, and almost subliminal nature. Banal nationalism is often created via state institutions such as schools. It can contribute to bottom-up processes of nation-building.

Journalist Francesca Barca and author Michael Antonio Fino have called gastronationalism a form of banal nationalism.

== Distinction from extremist variants ==
Michael Billig's primary purpose in coining the term was to clearly differentiate everyday, regular nationalism from extremist variants. He argued that the academic and journalistic focus on extreme nationalists, independence movements, and xenophobes in the 1980s and 1990s obscured the strength of contemporary nationalism, by implying that nationalism was a fringe ideology rather than a dominant theme in contemporary political culture.

Billig noted the almost unspoken assumption of the utmost importance of the nation in political discourse of the time, for example in the calls to protect Kuwait during the Gulf War, or to take action in the United States after the September 11 attacks. He argues that the "hidden" nature of modern nationalism makes it a very powerful ideology, partially because it remains largely unexamined and unchallenged, yet remains the basis for powerful political movements, and most political violence in the world today. Banal nationalism should not be thought of as a weak form of nationalism, but the basis for "dangerous nationalisms".

== Contrast with other causes for mobilized action ==
However, in earlier times, calls to the "nation" were not as important, when religion, monarchy or family might have been invoked more successfully to mobilize action. Billig also uses the concept to dispute post-modernist claims that the nation state is in decline, noting particularly the continued hegemonic power of American nationalism.
