= Zeyvə, Davachi =

Zeyvə
- Municipality
- Location within Azerbaijan
- Coordinates: 41°12′02″N 48°44′25″E
- Country: Azerbaijan
- Rayon: Davachi

Population
  - Total: 1,252
- Time zone: UTC+4 (AZT)
  - Summer (DST): UTC+5 (AZT)

Zeyvə (also, Zeyva) is a village and municipality in the Davachi Rayon of Azerbaijan. It has a population of 1,252. The municipality consists of the villages of Zeyvə and Kilvar.

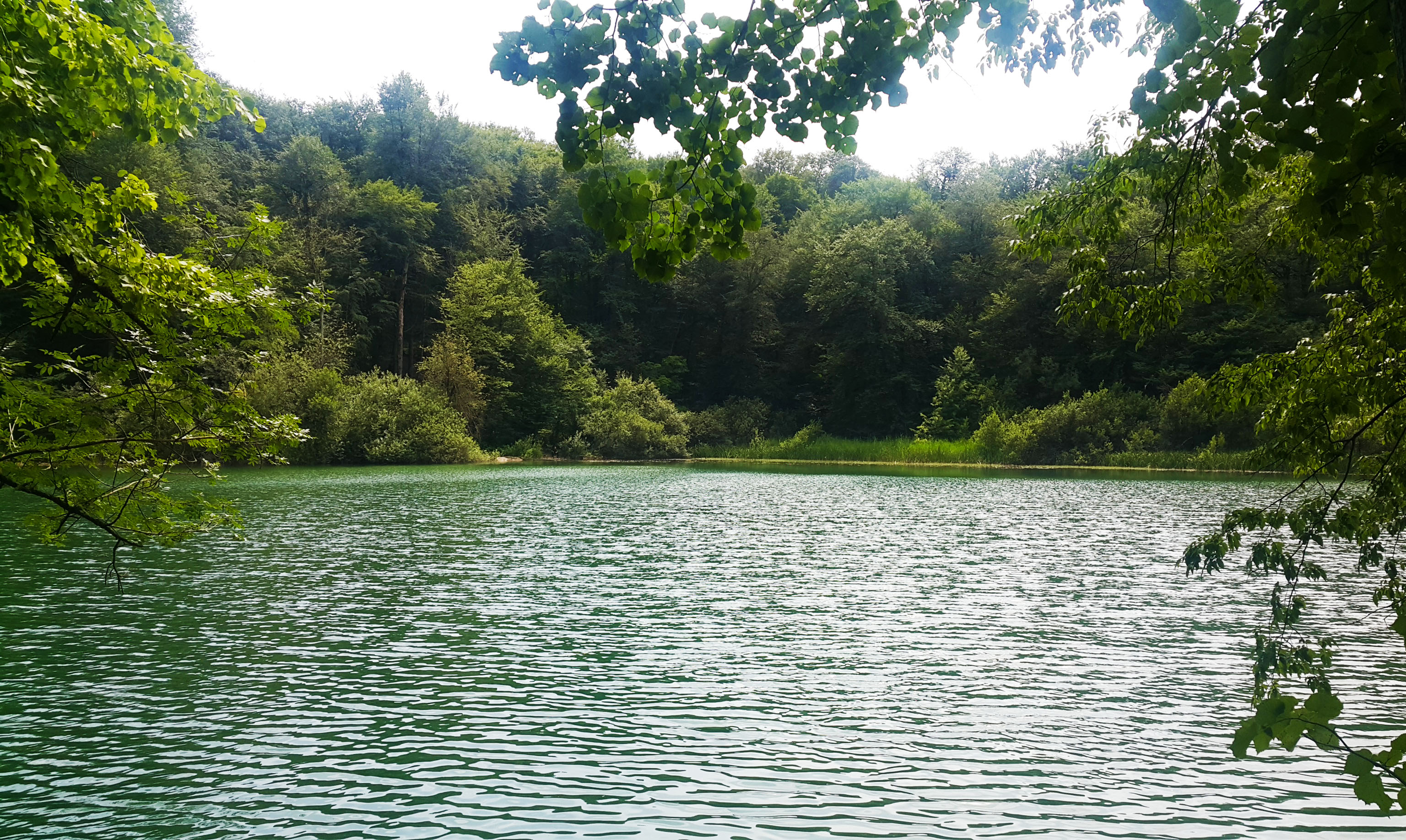
Anbil lake
