= Toxmar =

Human settlement in Azerbaijan

Coordinates: 41°16′N 48°38′E

Toxmar is a village in the municipality of Talabı in the Quba Rayon of Azerbaijan.
