= Şərifoba =

- Location within Azerbaijan
- Coordinates: 41°33′09″N 48°49′23″E
- Country: Azerbaijan
- Rayon: Khachmaz
- Municipality: Uzunoba
- Time zone: UTC+4 (AZT)
  - Summer (DST): UTC+5 (AZT)

Şərifoba (also, Shərifoba) is a village in the Khachmaz Rayon of Azerbaijan. The village forms part of the municipality of Uzunoba.
