= Uzunoba, Khachmaz =

Uzunoba
- Municipality
- Location within Azerbaijan
- Coordinates: 41°34′26″N 48°49′05″E
- Country: Azerbaijan
- Rayon: Khachmaz

Population
  - Total: 1,260
- Time zone: UTC+4 (AZT)
  - Summer (DST): UTC+5 (AZT)

Uzunoba is a village and municipality in the Khachmaz Rayon of Azerbaijan. It has a population of 1,260. The municipality consists of the villages of Uzunoba, Baraxum, Xəzərli, and Şərifoba.
