= Uzunoba, Aghjabadi =

Uzunoba
- Location within Azerbaijan Location within Karabakh Economic Region
- Coordinates: 40°14′04″N 47°29′12″E
- Country: Azerbaijan
- Rayon: Aghjabadi
- Time zone: UTC+4 (AZT)
  - Summer (DST): UTC+5 (AZT)

Uzunoba is a village in the Aghjabadi Rayon of Azerbaijan.
