= Yuxarı Uzunoba =

- Municipality
- Location within Azerbaijan
- Coordinates: 39°17′18″N 45°26′32″E
- Country: Azerbaijan
- Autonomous republic: Nakhchivan
- District: Babek

Population (2005)
  - Total: 548
- Time zone: UTC+4 (AZT)

Yuxarı Uzunoba (also, Uzun-Oba-Yukhari and Yukhary Uzunoba) is a village and municipality in the Babek District of Nakhchivan, Azerbaijan. It is located 20 km in the north from the district center, on the left bank of the Nakhchivanchay River. Its population is busy with gardening, vegetable-growing, grain-growing and animal husbandry. There are secondary school, library, club, mosque and a medical center in the village. It has a population of 548. The name of the village means "the Uzunoba village which is located in the upside"
