= Baraxum =

- Location within Azerbaijan
- Coordinates: 41°35′27″N 48°47′57″E
- Country: Azerbaijan
- Rayon: Khachmaz
- Municipality: Uzunoba
- Time zone: UTC+4 (AZT)
  - Summer (DST): UTC+5 (AZT)

Baraxum (also, Barakhum and Beyuk-Barakhum) is a village in the Khachmaz Rayon of Azerbaijan. The village forms part of the municipality of Uzunoba.
