= Madrasa (village) =

Madrasa Մատրասա • Matrasa Mədrəsə
- Municipality
- Location within Azerbaijan
- Coordinates: 40°36′53″N 48°33′51″E
- Country: Azerbaijan
- District: Shamakhi

Population (2008)
  - Total: 2,597
- Time zone: UTC+4 (AZT)

Madrasa (Azerbaijani: Mədrəsə; Armenian: Մատրասա, romanized: Matrasa) is a village and municipality in the Shamakhi District of Azerbaijan. This village had a generally homogeneous Armenian population in 1918 and maintained a significant Armenian presence up until the forced exodus of Armenians from Azerbaijan in 1988. It has a population of 2,597.

Madrasa was home to one of the last two Armeno-Tat communities in Azerbaijan, until they were expelled in the 1990s.

It is the origin of the Madrasa grape, which is still cultivated locally and internationally for winemaking.

== Population ==
Historically, Madrasa was an Armenian-populated village with several churches. Below is the demographic evolution of the village according to Russian Empire and early Soviet sources:

| Year | Number of Households | Number of Armenians | Notes | Source |
|---|---|---|---|---|
| 1820 | 107 families | ≈ 750–850 (est.) | Armenian families only | |
| 1855 | — | — | Armenian Gregorians; spoke Armenian, Persian, and Tatar | |
| 1856–1864 | 281 households | 1,784 | Armenian Gregorians; presence of church | |
| 1873 | 374 households | 2,187 | Armenian Gregorians | |
| 1886 | 483 households | 2,774 | Armenian Gregorians | |
| 1911 | 694 households | 4,321 | Armenians | |
| 1914 | — | 4,611 | Armenians | |
| 1921 | — | 1,855 (1,548 present) | Armenians | |

The village had at least one functioning Armenian church noted in 19th-century imperial surveys.

== See also ==
- Kilvar
