= Mirzayi =

Mirzayi (Armenian: Միրզաի or Միրզեի; Azerbaijani: Mirzəyi) is an Armenian and Azerbaijani female dance of Iranian origin.

Traditionally, it is performed in weddings. It can be performed both by women and men. Different Armenian varieties of the dance recorded in Shirak region are also known as Old Mirzayi (Armenian: Հին Միրզայի) and Tarakyama-Mirzayi (Armenian: Թարաքյամա-Միրզայի). In Azerbaijan, the dance is called "Vagzaly" (Azerbaijani: Vağzalı).

== The dance in culture ==
The dance was performed in the Soviet Armenian drama film Pepo, which was considered the 'most outstanding' film in Soviet cinema before the outbreak of World War II. Uzeyir Hajibeyov used this dance in "If Not That One, Then This One" operetta composed by him. Mashadi Ibad, a main hero of the comedy, performs "Mirzayi" in his wedding, in the fourth act of the comedy.

External videos
- Performance of the dance
- Performance of the dance
