= Dzoragyugh, Gegharkunik =

Village in Gegharkunik, Armenia

Dzoragyugh Ձորագյուղ
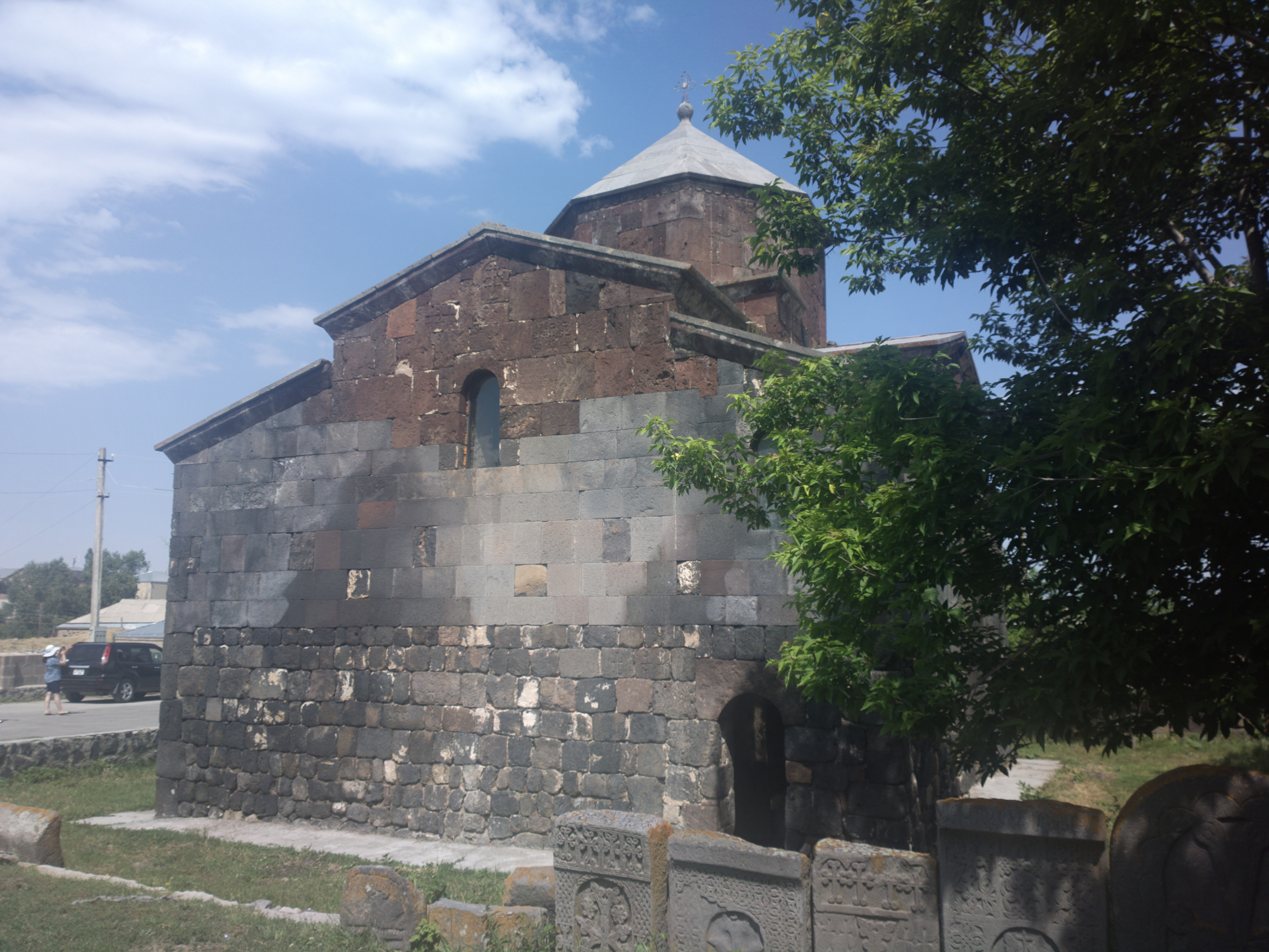
- Masruts Anapat Church in Dzoragyugh

- Location within Armenia Location within Gegharkunik
- Coordinates: 40°10′10″N 45°11′55″E
- Country: Armenia
- Province: Gegharkunik
- Municipality: Martuni
- Reoccupied: 1930
- Elevation: 2,003 m (6,572 ft)

Population (2011)
  - Total: 4,737
- Time zone: UTC+4 (AMT)
- Postal code: 1412

Dzoragyugh (Armenian: Ձորագյուղ) is a village in the Martuni Municipality of the Gegharkunik Province of Armenia. There is a ruined church dating back to the 9th century as well as a hermitage also of the 9th century in the village.

== Gallery ==
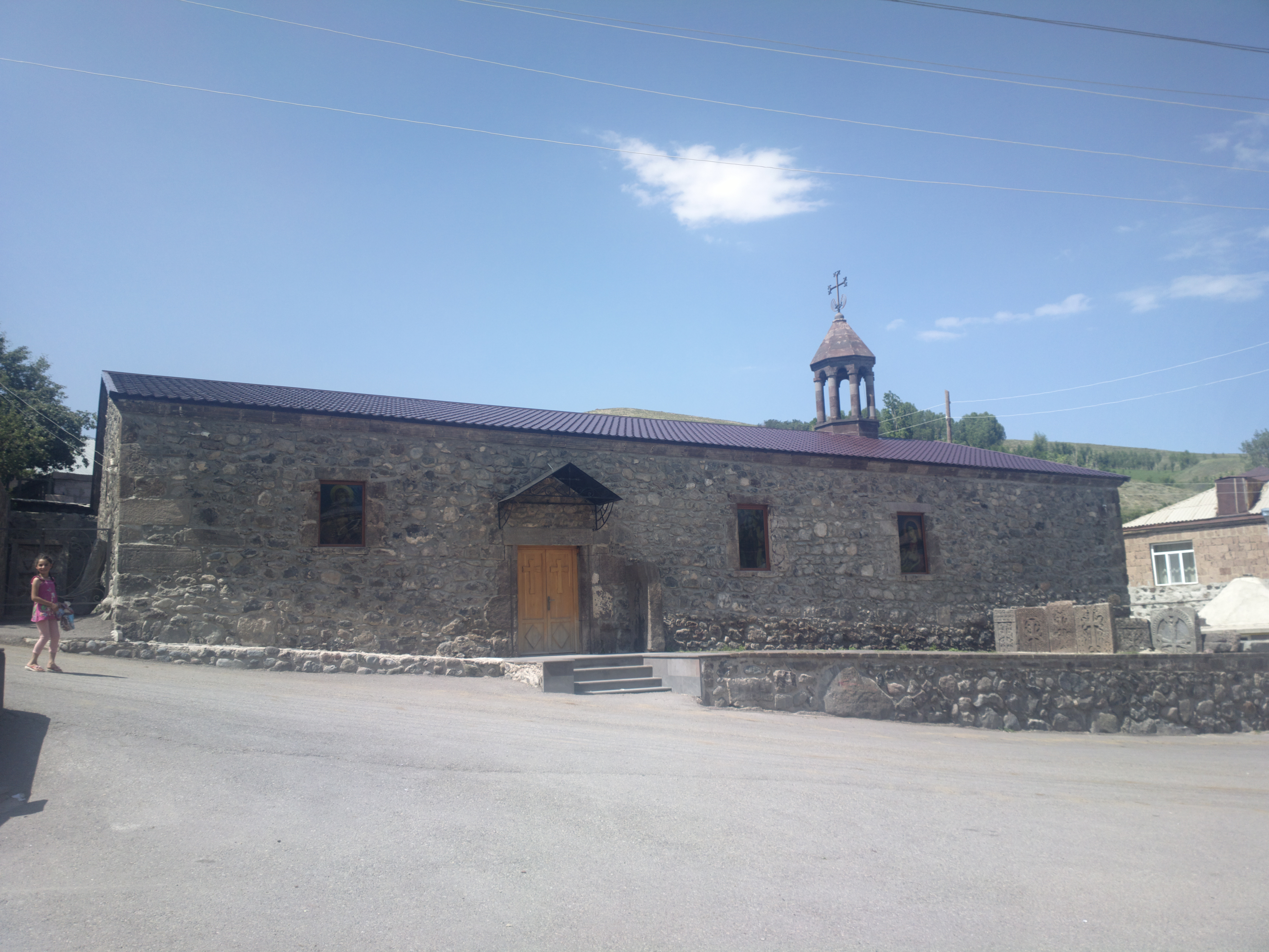
Holy Mother of God church in Dzoragyugh

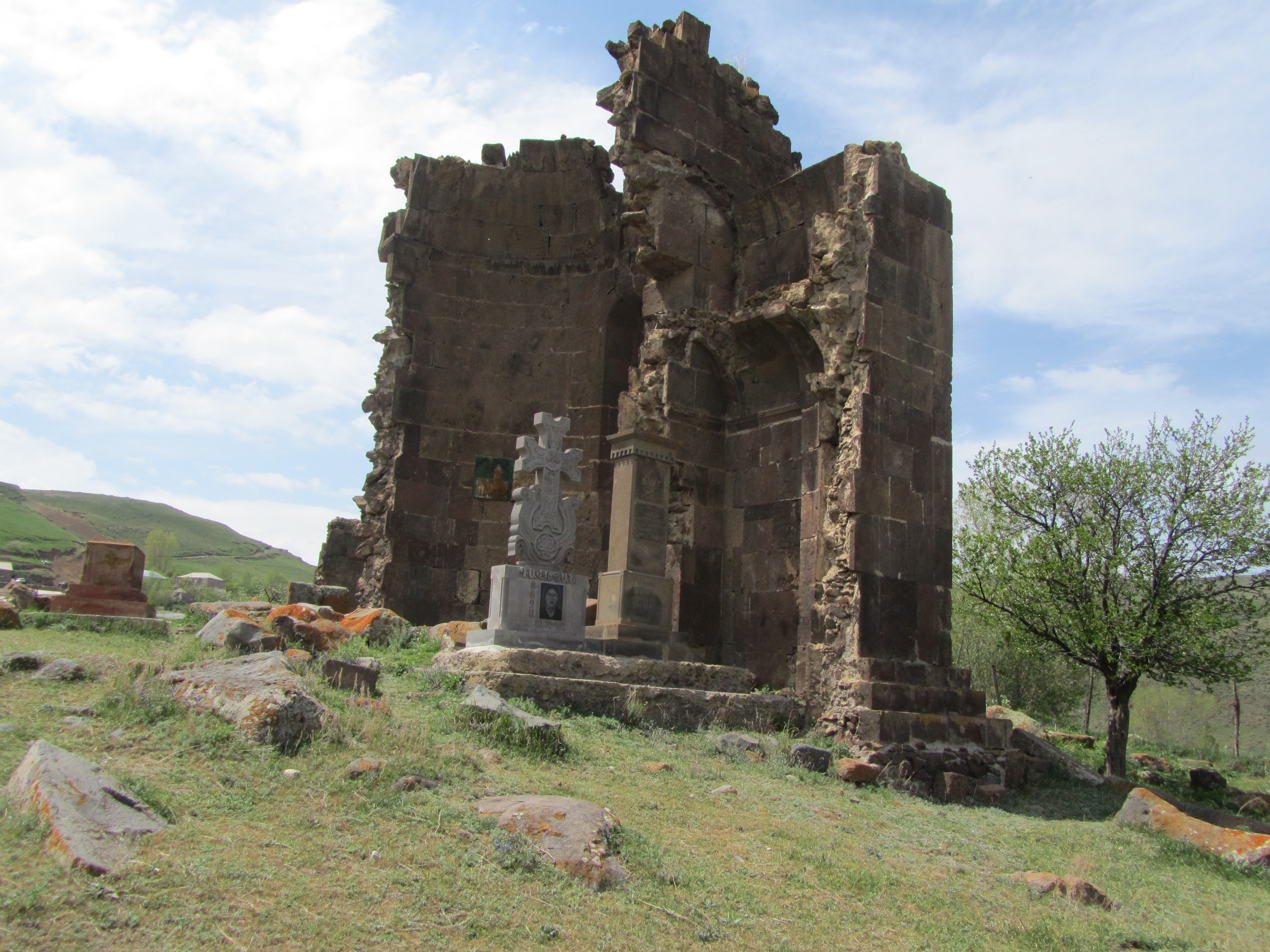
Shoghagavank Monastery
