= Talabı =

- Municipality
- Location within Azerbaijan
- Coordinates: 41°16′03″N 48°39′38″E
- Country: Azerbaijan
- Rayon: Quba

Population
  - Total: 409
- Time zone: UTC+4 (AZT)
  - Summer (DST): UTC+5 (AZT)

Talabı (also, Bash Talaby and Bash-Talabi) is a village and municipality in the Quba Rayon of Azerbaijan. It has a population of 409. The municipality consists of the villages of Talabı and Toxmar.
