= Kilvar =

Kilvar Armenian: Քիլվար
- Giləvar
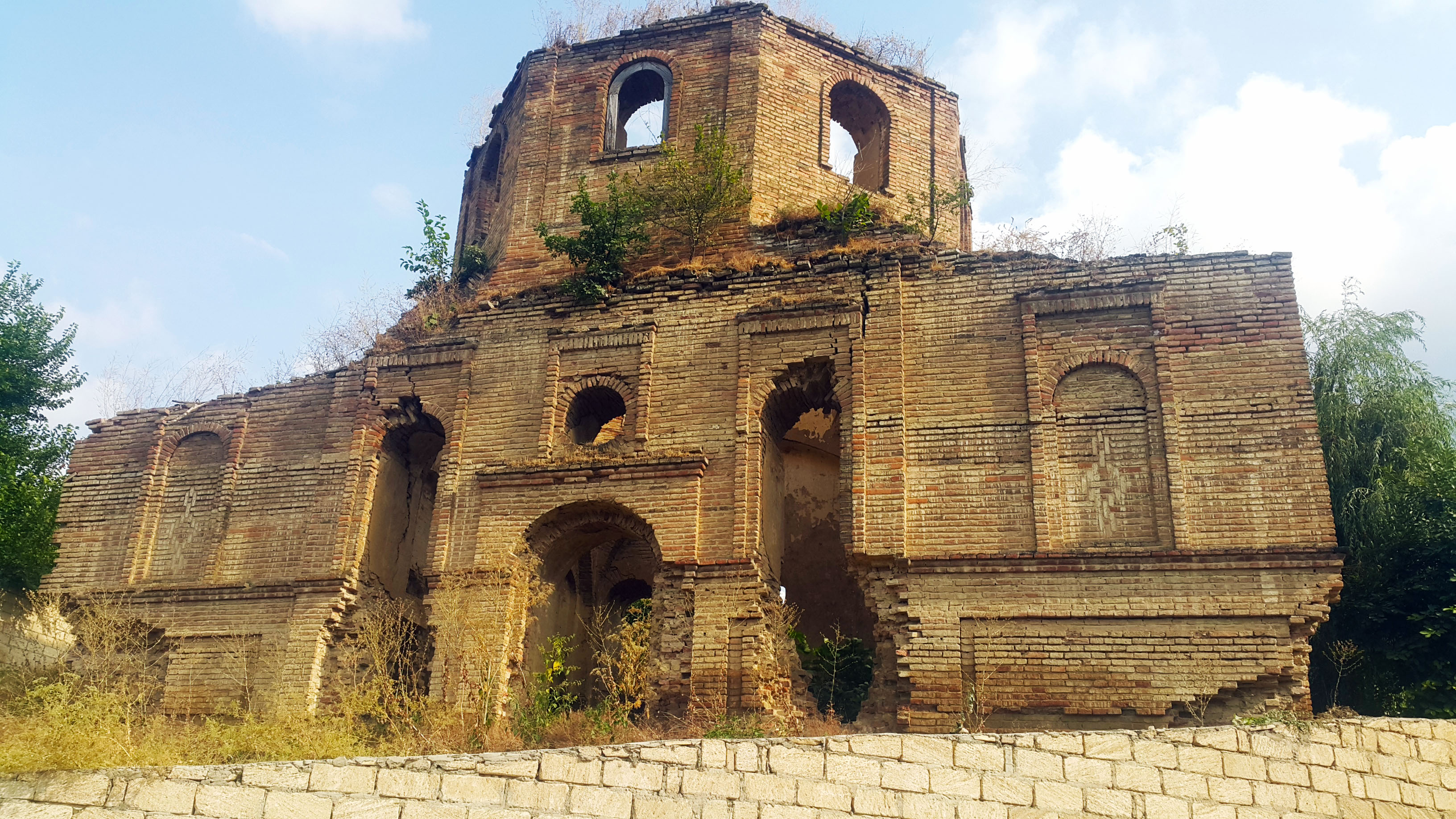
- Ruins of the Armenian church in Kilvar

- Location within Azerbaijan
- Coordinates: 41°12′52″N 48°43′13″E
- Country: Azerbaijan
- District: Shabran
- Municipality: Zeyvə
- Time zone: UTC+4 (AZT)

Kilvar (Armenian: Քիլվար; Tat: Kilvar) is a village in the Shabran District of Azerbaijan. The village forms part of the municipality of Pirəbədil.

In 1908, the population of Kilvar was 599 Tat people. Kilvar was home to one of the last two Armeno-Tat communities in Azerbaijan, with the other one in Madrasa, before the exodus of Armenians from Azerbaijan after the outbreak of the Nagorno-Karabakh conflict.

== Gallery ==
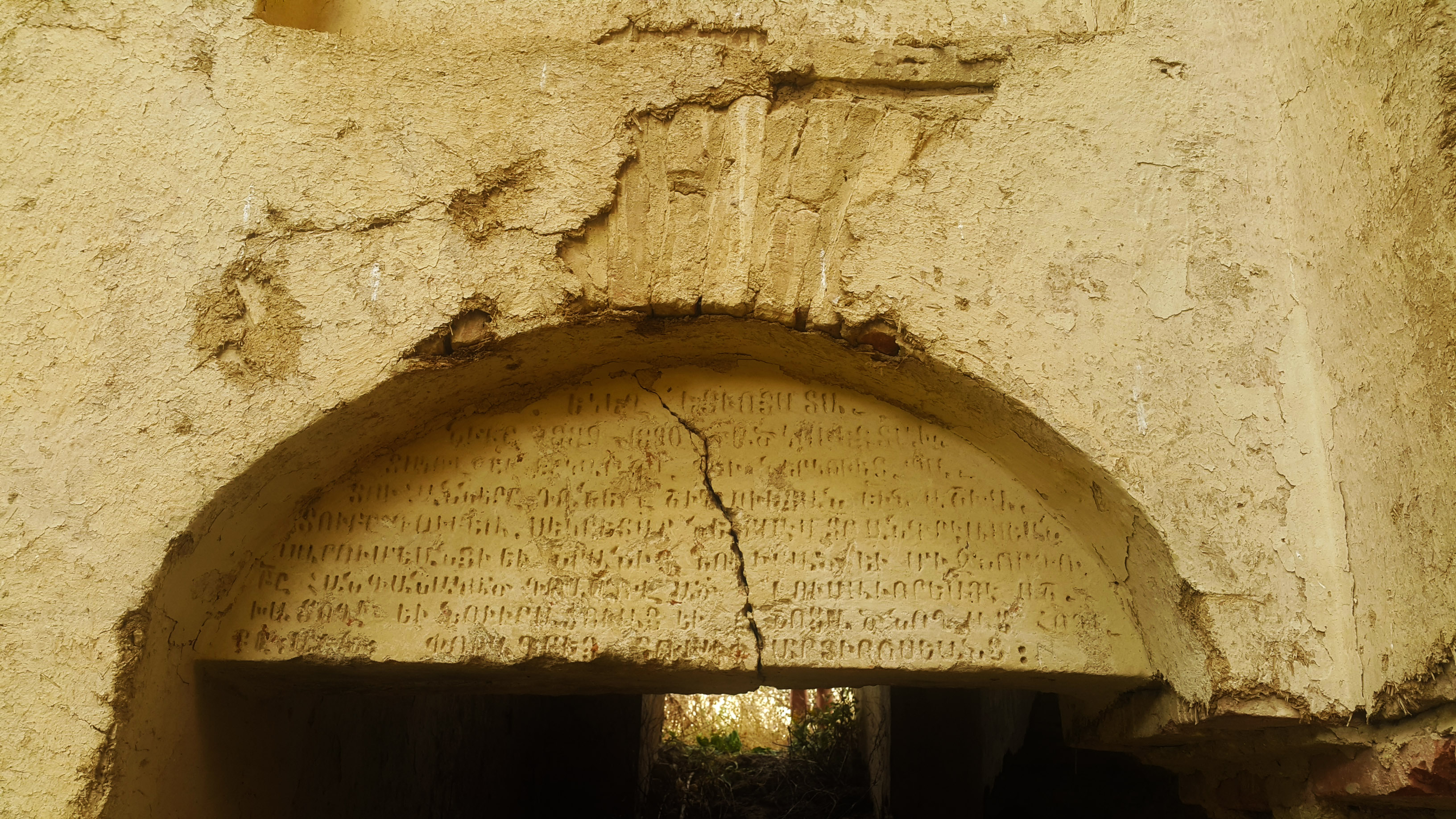
Inscription above the doorway of the Armenian church
