= Tsaghkasar =

Tsaghkasar Ծաղկասար
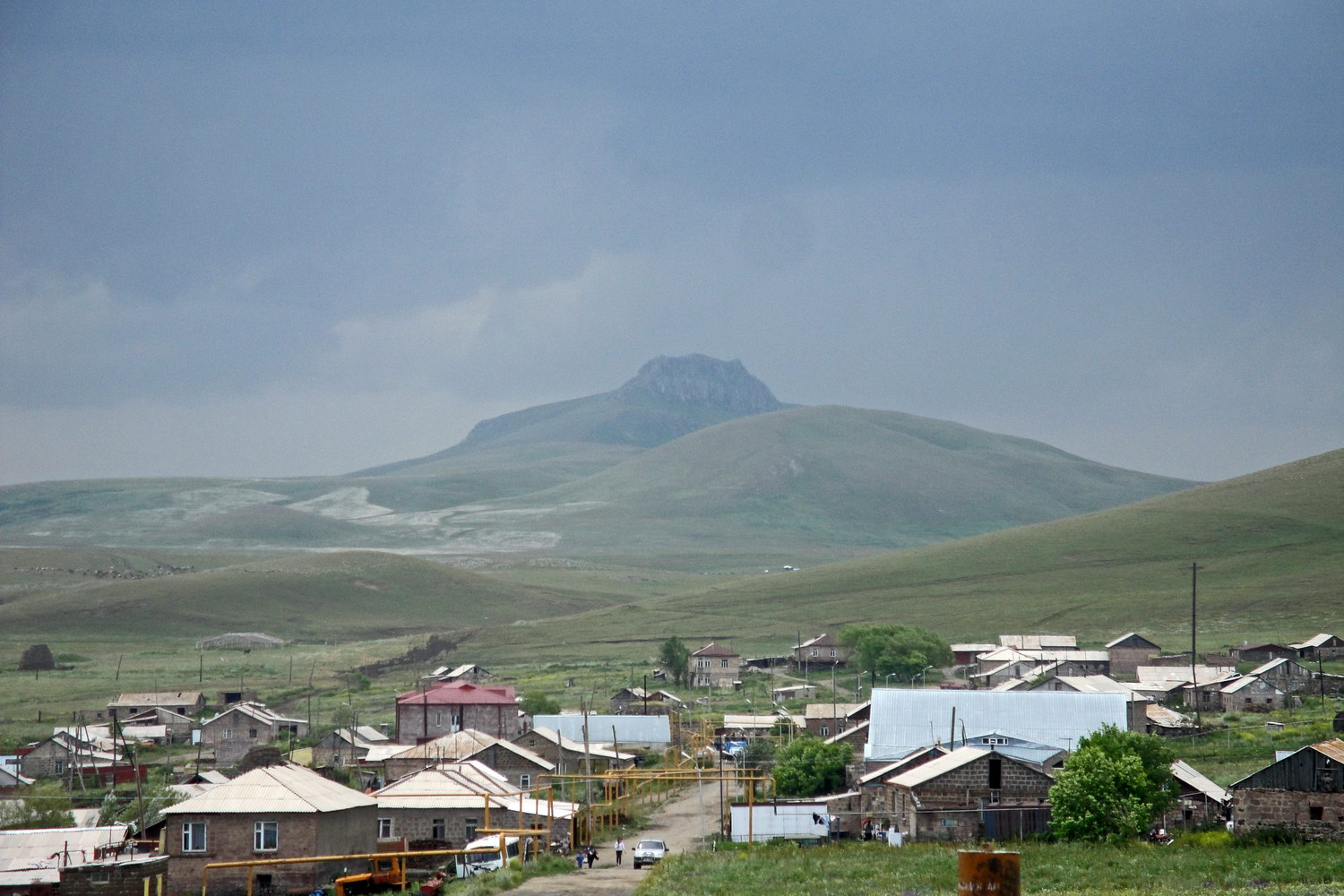

- Location within Armenia Location within Aragatsotn
- Coordinates: 40°27′58″N 43°53′59″E
- Country: Armenia
- Province: Aragatsotn
- Municipality: Talin
- Elevation: 1,990 m (6,530 ft)

Population (2011)
  - Total: 71
- Time zone: UTC+4
  - Summer (DST): UTC+5

Tsaghkasar (Armenian: Ծաղկասար) is a village in the Talin Municipality of the Aragatsotn Province of Armenia. The village has a shrine dedicated to Tadevos the Apostle and ruins of a cycoplean fort.
