= Köhnə Xaçmaz =

Kohna Khachmaz
- Municipality
- Azerbaijani: Köhnə Xaçmaz
- Location within Azerbaijan
- Coordinates: 41°28′56″N 48°47′27″E
- Country: Azerbaijan
- District: Khachmaz

Population
  - Total: 3,358
- Time zone: UTC+4 (AZT)
  - Summer (DST): UTC+5 (AZT)

Köhnə Xaçmaz (also, Kohna Khachmaz) is a village and municipality in the Khachmaz District of Azerbaijan. It has a population of 3,358.
