= Dzoragyugh, Aragatsotn =

Dzoragyugh Ձորագյուղ
- Location within Armenia Location within Aragatsotn
- Coordinates: 40°28′N 43°54′E
- Country: Armenia
- Province: Aragatsotn
- Municipality: Talin

Population (2011)
  - Total: 14
- Time zone: UTC+4
  - Summer (DST): UTC+5

Dzoragyugh (Armenian: Ձորագյուղ) is a village in the Talin Municipality of the Aragatsotn Province of Armenia.
