= Qaracallı, Khachmaz =

Garajally
- Azerbaijani: Qaracallı
- Location within Azerbaijan
- Coordinates: 41°33′48″N 48°50′44″E
- Country: Azerbaijan
- District: Khachmaz
- Municipality: Ahmedoba
- Time zone: UTC+4 (AZT)
  - Summer (DST): UTC+5 (AZT)

Qaracallı (also, Garajally) is a village in the Khachmaz District of Azerbaijan. The village forms part of the municipality of Ahmedoba.
