= Forced assimilation in Azerbaijan =

Assimilation of minorities in Azerbaijan

Azerbaijan has had a deliberate policy of forced assimilation of ethnic minorities or Azerbaijanization since Soviet times (Azerbaijan SSR) and up to the present. Non-Turkic peoples, such as Talyshis, Tats, Kurds, Lezgins, Georgian-Ingiloy, Udis and others have been subjected to forced Azerbaijanization (Turkification).

In Soviet period the policy was carried out by:

- proclaiming non-Turkic Muslim peoples of Azerbaijan SSR as ethnic groups of the Turkic Azerbaijani people
- manipulating population censuses
- constantly emphasizing on a commonality of history and closeness of cultures, including in academic publications.

== Soviet period ==
In the USSR, Azerbaijanis were considered the "titular nation" and their name coincided with the name of the union republic — the Azerbaijani SSR. All other peoples (Talysh, Tats, Lezgins, Georgian-Ingilois and others) on its territory were considered "nontitular minorities". Although at the all-Union and republic levels "non-titular" peoples had equal rights with "titular" Azerbaijanis, in practice they were not treated equally. Over time, the power disbalance between "titular" Azerbaijanis and non-titular nationalities became more and more pronounced. Azerbaijanis became the main beneficiaries of the nativization policies and practices in the republic. Following the 1930s, there was a heightened exacerbation of this situation concerning non-titular minorities of Azerbaijan, who experienced restricted or absent access to equivalent national rights, including support for national culture, facilitation of native language advancement, etc. "Non-titular" ethnic groups encountered escalating assimilatory pressures to identify as part of the "titular" Azerbaijani nationality.

Azerbaijani leadership had been pursuing a policy of discrimination toward ethnic minorities before the disintegration of USSR and after it.

According to Krista Goff, in order to justify the assimilation policy regarding non-titular minorities, Azerbaijani officials and scholars increasingly began to talk from the 1950s about the “purportedly ancient, local origins of the Azeri nation,” writing ethnic minorities into its history. Thus, emphasizing that the Talysh and other peoples of the Azerbaijan SSR “descended from the same ancient population” as the Azerbaijanis (Azerbaijani Turks), they tried to pass off "the formation of the Azeri-defined Soviet Azerbaijani people" as a "natural, centuries-long process rather than the result of forced assimilation, as some minorities claimed."

=== Peoples ===
==== Talysh ====
Official census figures on Talyshis produced by the Azerbaijan SSR
Year	Pop.	±%
1939	87,510	—
1959	85	−99.9%
1970	No Talyshis recorded	—
1979	No Talyshis recorded	—
1989	21,196	—
From

Talysh people are an indigenous people of the Talish region. They are an Iranian ethnic group.

Talyshis suffered from forced assimilation in Azerbaijan SSR. In the 1950s, they experienced assimilatory politics with erasure of their nationality category from the public sphere.

The 1939 census stated that Talysh people constituted the fifth largest national community in Azerbaijan SSR, following Azeris, Russians, Armenians, and Lezgins, numbering 87,510 people. However, the 1959 census counted only 85 individuals of Talysh nationality in Azerbaijan. The official explanation of the authorities for the almost complete disappearance of thousands of the Talyshes in this census was that "Talyshes voluntarily and en masse self-identified as Azeri to census workers". In her book, Krista Goff shows through documentary evidence that the Central Statistical Administration in Moscow had plans to include a Talysh nationality category in the 1959 census, but this category was excluded during the process of collecting and reporting the census in Azerbaijan itself.

The leadership of the Azerbaijan SSR used the manipulated census data in Soviet ethnography, creating a narrative of the “voluntary and complete assimilation” of the Talysh people, and that it occurred “naturally over time rather than from artificial manipulations of minority communities and identifications". Subsequently, there followed the production of a large amount of encyclopedic, ethnographic, linguistic, historical-geographical and other material that developed and reproduced narratives designed to justify the national “erasure” of the Talyshis and strengthen the official myth of their “voluntary assimilation.” Soviet ethnographers emphasized their common features in culture and life with the Azerbaijanis and presented the “assimilation” of the Iranian-speaking Talysh by the Turkic-speaking Azerbaijanis as an “impressive achievement” of the Soviet state, “ethnohistorical progress.” So, for example, the Great Soviet Encyclopedia began to say that “in the USSR, the Talysh almost merged with the Azerbaijanis, who are very close in material and spiritual culture, and therefore were not identified in the 1970 census”.

This assimilation policy put great social, political and economic pressure on the Talyshis and on their daily life, encouraging them to “merge” with the "titular" Azerbaijani nation. For example, Talyshis could not register as representatives of Talysh nationality in official documents, and parents could not enroll their children in schools teaching in the Talysh language. Some Talysh petitioned the authorities for their rights to be identified as Talysh in government documents, but all these requests were rejected by the authorities until 1989. Others, finding no other way out, accepted Azerbaijani identification in order to avoid discrimination in everyday life, for example, when applying for a job. Krista Goff also cites stories of Talysh who admitted that due to the stigmatization of their nationality, the lack of schools, books and other resources for the Talyshis of Azerbaijan, as well as the lack of any preferences for being a Talyshi, they preferred the Azerbaijani self-identification and the Azerbaijani language, even fearing that their children could face discrimination if they speak Azerbaijani with a Talysh accent. Representatives of the Talysh people often internalized these assimilation narratives about themselves that were told to them and which they found in encyclopedias, articles and other printed material.

From 1960 to 1989, the Talysh were not included in the censuses as a separate ethnic group, as they were considered part of the Azerbaijanis (Azerbaijani Turks).

In 1978, a part of the Talysh addressed the Central Statistical Office in Moscow and the Pravda newspaper with collective complaints that the census workers refused to register them as Talysh in the upcoming 1979 census. To which they received a response letter from the head of the Department of the All-Union Census A. A. Isupov, saying that the category of Talysh nationality would not be included in the census, because, Isupov wrote, referring to the ethnographic report on the assimilation of the Talysh, the Talysh are now Azerbaijanis.

In her book, Krista Goff provides interviews with some Talyshis: "During these censuses [from 1959 to 1979] no one asked us about our nationality or self-identification. The census workers sat in the regional or village office and filled in the national composition of the population ahead of time based on orders from above. Then they asked us to fill in the other lines." Respondents also shared with Goff stories about how census takers recorded them as “Azerbaijanis” when they presented themselves as Talyshi, and denied the very existence of Talysh nationality; In addition, when collecting information for the census, workers avoided the categories of native language and nationality. During the preparation of materials for the 1970 population census, some ethnographers and cartographers in Moscow expressed doubts about the census data, claiming that the Azerbaijani census authorities "artificially assimilated" the Talyshis in order to "portray their region as more ethnically homogeneous" and Azerbaijanis to be "more consolidated", than in reality.

Only in 1989, the Talysh nationality was returned to the census, immediately counting 21,196 Talyshes.

According to Victor Schnirelmann, since during the Soviet years the authorities subjected the Talyshis to “reinforced Azerbaijanization,” this created separatist sentiments among them. This led to the Talyshis “rebelling” after the collapse of the USSR, proclaiming Talysh-Mughan Autonomous Republic.

==== Tats ====
Tat people are an indigenous people in the Caucasus. They are an Iranian ethnic group.

Tats were subjected to forced assimilation in Azerbaijan SSR.

==== Georgian-Ingilois ====
According to Krista Goff, "Muslim Georgian-Ingilois in Soviet Azerbaijan experienced significant pressure to identify as part of the titular Azerbaijani nation. Although most ethnographers continued to categorize Christian Georgian-Ingilois as Georgian, Muslim Georgian-Ingilois at best were considered an ethnographic group of the Georgian nation and registered as Azerbaijani in Soviet passports and censuses".

In 1962 anonymous group of Georgian-Ingilois of the Azerbaijan SSR petitioned Nikita Khrushchev about experienced violations of their rights and begged him to improve their condition, writing "We love the languages of all republics of our Soviet Union and their culture […] why not love our language and our culture"?

==== Kurds ====
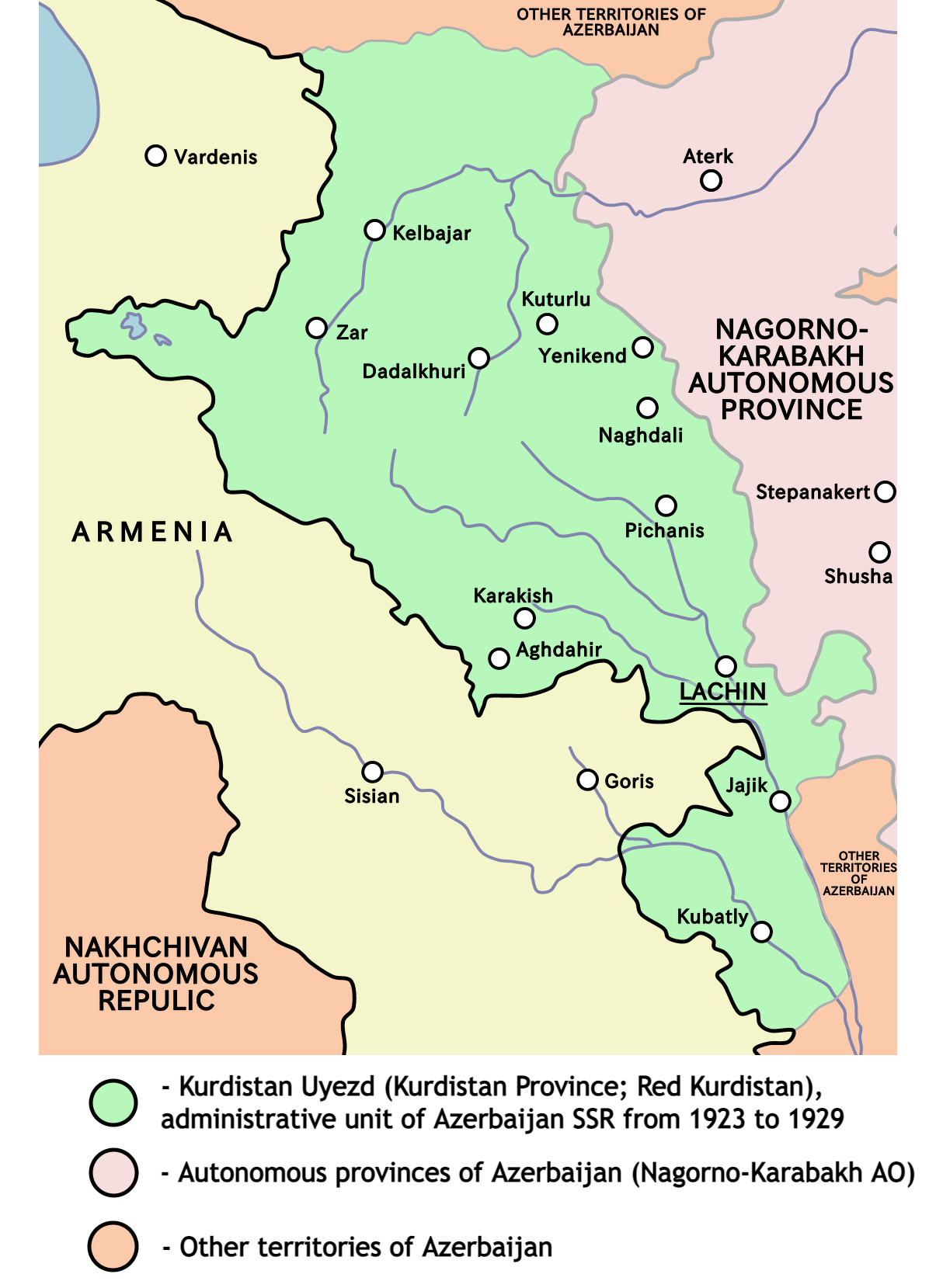
Kurdistan Uezd within Azerbaijan SSR in 1920s.

Official census figures on Kurds produced by the Azerbaijan SSR
Year	Pop.	±%
1921	32,780	—
1926	41,000	+25.1%
1939	6,000	−85.4%
1959	1,500	−75.0%
1970	5,000	+233.3%
1979	No Kurds recorded in Azerbaijan	—
1989	13,000	—
From

At the beginning of the USSR, Kurds in Azerbaijan constituted a majority in its western regions neighboring Armenia. Most of them were farmers and urban traders, and unlike the Shia Azerbaijanis, they were Sunni. Unlike the city of Ganja (later Kirovabad), where the Kurds were almost fully assimilated, the area that would later be formed in the Kurdistan Uezd (known to the Kurds as Red Kurdistan, Kurdish: Kurdistana sor) was almost entirely Kurdish. (Note: This territory was approximately 5,200 square kilometers and began forty kilometers southwest of Ganja, extending to the Araks and the Iranian border with Nagorno-Karabakh in the east. It included Lachin, its capital, and the main towns Kalbajar, Kubatli and Zangelan, and the administrative subdivisions of Karakushlak, Koturli, Murad-Khanli and Kurd-Haji.) On July 4, 1923, Moscow decreed the Kurdish region with the main city of Lachin to become part of the Azerbaijan SSR. Nagorno-Karabakh and the Nakhichevan enclave, both with noticeable Kurdish minorities, were also made parts of the Azerbaijan SSR.

In 1923 the Central Committee established the Kurdistan Uezd within Azerbaijan with Lachin city as its capital, as well as a Kurdish governing body. There were founded Kurdish schools and a teacher's training college at Shusha. Books in Kurdish language were published, with a political periodical Sovyet Kurdustan ("Soviet Kurdistan"). Also Kurdish-language broadcasting existed. But self-government did not last long, and in 1929 the Azerbaijani government reduced Red Kurdistan from an uyezd to an okrug, the lowest territorial unit for non-Russian nationalities.

Under Stalin the policy of the authorities of the Azerbaijan SSR towards the Kurds was similar to that of Turkey. They were subjected to forced assimilation with manipulation of their population figures, settlement of non-Kurds in predominantly Kurdish areas, publication suppression and abolishment of Kurdish as a language of instruction in schools. Also, in 1937, they experienced forced deportation to Kazakhstan, with Azerbaijanis settling their land. As with many others (see for example Azerbaijanization of Nizami), Kurdish historical figures such as Sharafkhan Bidlisi, Ehmedê Xanî and the whole Shaddadid dynasty were declared Azerbaijanis. Kurds with retained "Kurdish" nationality in their internal passports, unlike those with "Azerbaijani" nationality, had no chance to find any employment. As late as the 1960s the Kurdish department of the Institute of Oriental Studies at Baku was abolished. (Note: Kurdish studies in USSR continued in institutions in Moscow, Leningrad and Yerevan.) The political periodical Sovyet Kurdustan ("Soviet Kurdistan") although continued to be published in the 1930s, was transferred from Kurdish language to a Turkish with an alphabet made up of Cyrillic and Roman letters and provided coverage of unrelated to Kurds issues.

According to Ismet Cheriff Vanly, Soviet statistics on Kurds is unreliable. In 1921 census counted 32 780 Kurds in Azerbaijan, in 1926 — 41 000, in 1939 — 6 000, in 1959 — 1 500, in 1970 — 5 000. In 1979 there were no Kurds recorded in Azerbaijan SSR. And then in 1989 — 13 000 Kurds. When Soviet Kurds asked the authorities about the “disappearance of the Kurds” (Kurdish: windabûna Kurdan), the official explanation was that “they had assimilated for objective reasons” because they were Muslims like the Azerbaijanis. Vanly points out that in other Muslim countries where Kurds live, such as Turkey, Iraq, Syria and Iran, this has not been the case. Furthermore, in 1988 about 10 000 of the "lost" Azerbaijani Kurds returned their passports to Moscow with requests that the nationality column be changed from "Azerbaijani" to "Kurdish". With regard to the figures of 1926, 1939 and 1959 official cencuces, scholar Alexandre Bennigsen remarks that "most Soviet Kurdologists regard these as inadequate" and quotes an estimate by Soviet Kurdologist Tatyana Aristova of 160 000 Kurds in 1954. Vanly gives his estimate of 180 000 Kurds in the Azerbaijan SSR in 1990.

In Turkmenistan the Kurds also were subjected to an active assimilation campaign with no facilities for education in Kurdish language. They also participated in efforts to reobtain their right to be recognized as a separate nationality.

In May 20–21, 1988, on a demonstration by Kurds that took place in Moscow, among others were present groups from Azerbaijan SSR. The demonstrators demanded that the central government provide security of daily Kurdish existence and the restoration of Kurdistan as an autonomous region within Azerbaijan.

==== Lezgins and Avars ====
Lezgins and Avars live in northern Azerbaijan.

The policy towards Lezgins and Avars was similar as towards the Talyshis. They were forced to register as "ethnic Azerbaijanis", encountering serious restrictions on their native languages and cultures. During Soviet times, ethnic Azerbaijanis actively settled in the north of the country, starting their assimilation.

==== Armenians ====
Armenians also experienced discriminatory practices. But despite facing constraints on their national-cultural development and political influence, Armenians always maintained a recognized status of their nationality in Soviet Azerbaijan, owing to factors such as the size of their population, the special status of the Nagorno-Karabakh Autonomous Oblast (NKAO), and the presence of the neighboring Armenian SSR. Relative to other ethnic groups within Azerbaijan, many Armenians in Azerbaijan enjoyed better access to native language educational resources; however, the suppression of Armenian language and culture was widespread; many Armenian churches, cemeteries, and schools were closed or destroyed, clerics arrested, and Armenian historical education was banned. The Armenian educational institutions that remained were under the administration of the Azeri Ministry of Education, which enforced prohibitions against teaching Armenian history and using Armenian materials and led to a curriculum that significantly differed from that of Armenia itself. Moreover, restrictions limited cultural exchanges and communication between Nagorno-Karabakh Armenians and Armenia, with significant neglect in transportation and communication infrastructure.

The Azerbaijani government's decree in 1957 that Azerbaijani was to be the main language and the alteration of educational content to favor Azerbaijani history over Armenian exemplified the systemic efforts to assimilate the Armenian population culturally. Baku's 1981 "law on the NKAO" denied additional rights, restricted cultural connections between Nagorno-Karabakh and Armenia, and removed provisions that had explicitly listed Armenian as a working language to be used by local authorities. During the Khrushchev Thaw, Karabakh Armenians began to periodically protest against the cultural and economic marginalization they faced in their native region. In 1962, they personally appealed to Nikita Khrushchev, "enumerating their grievances with official Baku and requesting the transfer of their territories from the jurisdiction of Soviet Azerbaijan to that of either Soviet Armenia or the Russian SFSR." By the time of perestroika, resentment against what was perceived as a forced "Azerification" campaign led to a mass movement for reunification with Armenia.

=== Study problems ===
According to Krista Goff, the history of the "non-titular" peoples of the Soviet republics, including Azerbaijan, has received little attention. Referring to Azerbaijani researcher Irada Kasumova, Goff writes:

The prime reason for this is not just ideological; it is a question of source base availability, political censorship, and methodology. Many nontitular minority communities were not bureaucratically recognized after the 1930s, making them much harder to trace in Soviet archives. There are also significant gaps in history writing and ethnographies of nontitular minorities because of repressive state practices. During the Great Terror some scholars from these communities, as well as some who studied them, were intentionally targeted, leading not only to an erasure of existing knowledge, but also indicating to all who survived that the study of sub-republic minorities was potentially dangerous. Thus, lacking robust narratives of post–World War II nationality politics and nontitular histories, Soviet historiography mostly leapfrogs over decades of evolving practices, theories, and experiences in this arena, drawing tenuous connections between the 1930s and 1990s and overlooking the formative postwar decades that gave rise to significant national movements.

In the late 1930s, the Soviet regime centralized population categorization around dominant nationalities, strongly reducing national support structures for "non-titular" nationalities such as local councils (soviets), schools, presses, etc. This led to a decline in bureaucratic processes that previously documented these minorities, pushing their identities further to the periphery. The decreasing archival visibility of "non-titular" minorities mirrored the state's transition from preservation to assimilation policies towards them. Consequently, it presents significant practical and conceptual obstacles for archival research.

According to Irada Kasumova, the 1936–1937 repression that targeted minority cultural leaders and scholars who studied ethnic minorities in Azerbaijan SSR (such as A. Bukshpan, who studied Kurds in the early 1930s) suppressed further work in the field.

In modern Azerbaijan, different archive directors and staff members conveyed to Goff that "[she] was wasting [her] time and theirs because it was anachronistic to study national minorities after the 1930s". Her ability to access archives was harshly restricted due to the persisting Nagorno-Karabakh conflict and Azerbaijan's historical context of autonomist and separatist movements. Because she studied ethnic minorities, she often faced accusations that she was an "Armenian spy" or "intended to commit treason or sow separatism." Additionally, institutional limitations were evident, with archivists informing her that files ordered by her were either inaccessible or had been destroyed (including bonfiring). Also, the director of the former Communist Party archive in Baku declared her a "separatist" in the presence of archival personnel and revoked her access pass to the facility. According to her, "these limitations of source access and institutional support do not just circumscribe the histories that are available to us; they also help explain why nontitular minorities are underrepresented in the historical record as well as why so many want to keep it that way today." Personal interviews with representatives of ethnic minorities in the areas where they live are complicated by an atmosphere of fear of state surveillance and of being put in jail. Goff writes that some people were questioned by the police or state officials simply because they invited to them a foreigner (that is her).

=== Evaluation ===
According to researchers, “erasing” peoples from censuses was one of the main ways to increase the “titular” Azerbaijani majority in the republic and homogenize it.

Answering a question about resolving the national issue in Azerbaijan, Neymat Panakhly said:

The present policy of Turkization in Azerbaijan is hostile to the Turkic world, it is directed at keeping the Turkic people in bondage and is an imperial policy. There was a time when people of various ethnic groups living in Azerbaijan were registered as Azerbaijanis. The aim was to obliterate the specific traits of these ethnic groups and the hardest hit were the Turkic peoples. In today’s Azerbaijan, a Kurd knows that he is a Kurd, a Talysh that he is a Talysh, a Lezgin that he is a Lezgin, a Tat that he is a Tat; even if the ethnic group consists of five people. The Azerbaijanis, however, have again been put in an unenviable position. All and sundry are speaking on television and asking: ‘Which is correct—Turkic or Azerbaijani?’. But there must be a limit to ignorance, dishonesty and indecency! Azerbaijan is a territorial-geographic name. How can ‘Azerbaijani’ be a nationality? Only because the policy of the state had been to declare it as such. The entry for nationality must be determined according to one’s choice—Turk, Talysh, Lezgin, Kurd, Russian, Jew, etc. Why does it bother other people when we speak of ‘the Turkic language?’ Do you need an interpreter when you are talking with Turks from Turkey? I speak Turkic.

According to Krista Goff, "a popular refusal to acknowledge assimilatory and discriminatory practices in Azerbaijan has had many unintended effects, including masking the ways in which past experiences and practices continue to shape its present."

== Modern period ==
According to Unrepresented Nations and Peoples Organization, ethnic minorities in modern Azerbaijan are subject to forced assimilation, including the Talyshis and Lezgins. Minority Rights Group International also expresses concern about the forced assimilation of Lezgins in Azerbaijan.

According to Christina Bratt Paulston and Donald Peckham, "[g]enerally there is a prevailing policy of forceful assimilation of all minorities, including the Talysh, Tat, Kurds and Lezgins" and "[i]n Azerbaijan there is a situation of total linguistic, cultural and political oppression and forced assimilation."

According to Akbar Ahmed, after the country gained independence in 1991, Lezgins and Avars of Azerbaijan "became subjected to Ataturk-style ethnic nationalism by the Azeri-dominated center." The Lezgin and Avar tribes, affected by the division of their clans and depletion of their herds due to the establishment of the Azerbaijan-Russia border, were often accused of collaboration with Armenia during Nagorno-Karabakh conflict. Ethnic Azerbaijani resettlement in the northern Azerbaijan continued in the 1990s, when the government settled over 100,000 Azerbaijani refugees into the Lezgin lands, meanwhile forcibly conscripting a great number of Lezgins to fight in the war. This spurred the rise of a Lezgin nationalist movement led by the Sadval (meaning in Lezgin “Unity”). The Azerbaijani government blamed Sadval for the 1994 Baku Metro bombings with fourteen dead. In 1996 Ali Antsukhskiy, one of the most prominent Avar leaders, was assassinated in Baku, while in 2002, Avar guerrilla leader Haji Magomedov was killed by Azerbaijani security forces. In 2008, an Avar advocacy group appealed with an open letter to the President of Dagestan (who was an Avar himself), urging intervention to halt what they termed as "physical and moral genocide" against Avars in Azerbaijan. They pointed out the predominance of ethnic Azerbaijani officials in Avar-populated areas, accusing them to "organize the destruction of the entire non-Azerbaijani material heritage and raze to the ground anything that may be reminiscent of the presence of other ethnic groups".

== Sources ==
- Ahmed, Akbar (2013). The Thistle and the Drone: How America's War on Terror Became a Global War on Tribal Islam. Brookings Institution Press. ISBN 9780815723790.
- Goff, Krista A. (2021). Nested Nationalism: Making and Unmaking Nations in the Soviet Caucasus. Ithaca, NY: Cornell University Press. ISBN 9781501753275.
- Kolga, Margus; Tõnurist, Igor; Vaba, Lembit [in Estonian]; Viikberg, Jüri [in Estonian] (2001). The Red Book of the Peoples of the Russian Empire. Institute of the Estonian Language.
- Malkasian, Mark (1996). Gha-ra-bagh!: The Emergence of the National Democratic Movement in Armenia. Detroit: Wayne State University Press. ISBN 0-8143-2605-6.
- Shakarian, Pietro A. (2025). Anastas Mikoyan: An Armenian Reformer in Khrushchev's Kremlin. Bloomington: Indiana University Press. ISBN 978-0253073556.
- Shlapentokh, Vladimir; Sendich, Munir; Payin, Emil [in Russian] (2016). The New Russian Diaspora Russian Minorities in the Former Soviet Republics. Taylor & Francis. ISBN 9781315484112.
- Siegelbaum, Lewis H.; Moch, Leslie Page (2023). Making National Diasporas: Soviet-Era Migrations and Post-Soviet Consequences. Cambridge University Press. ISBN 9781009371858.
- Vanly, Ismet Cheriff (1992). Kreyenbroek, Philip G.; Sperl, Stefan (eds.). The Kurds: A Contemporary Overview. Routledge. ISBN 0-203-99341-1.
