= Chingiz Babayev =

Azerbaijani soldier

- Çingiz Babayev
- Born: October 2, 1964; Baku, Azerbaijan SSR, Soviet Union
- Died: October 28, 1995 (aged 31); Baku, Azerbaijan
- Military career
- Allegiance: Azerbaijan Army, Azerbaijan Republic
- Service years: 1992–1995
- Rank: Senior Lieutenant
- Conflicts: First Nagorno-Karabakh War
- Awards: National Hero of Azerbaijan (1996)

Chingiz Adil oghlu Babayev (Azerbaijani: Çingiz Adil oğlu Babayev; 2 October 1964, Baku – 28 October 1995, Baku) was a Senior Lieutenant of Jamshid Nakhchivanski Military Lyceum who was posthumously awarded the title of the National Hero of Azerbaijan for saving people's lives during the 1995 Baku Metro fire.

Having graduated from school no. 20 in Yasamal Raion, Babayev entered the Azerbaijan Technical University. He subsequently worked in the employment center and during the First Nagorno-Karabakh War in 1992 volunteered for the military, where he became the chief of staff of a military unit.

During the 1995 Baku Metro fire, Babayev tried to rescue and help the passengers in distress, but lost his life. On 5 November 1996 by the order of the President of Azerbaijan he was posthumously awarded the title of the National Hero of Azerbaijan for the displayed courage and heroism. A memorial complex dedicated to Babayev was subsequently established inside the Ulduz metro station in Baku.
