= Nariman Narimanov =

Soviet Azerbaijani revolutionary and statesman (1870–1925)

- Nəriman Nərimanov
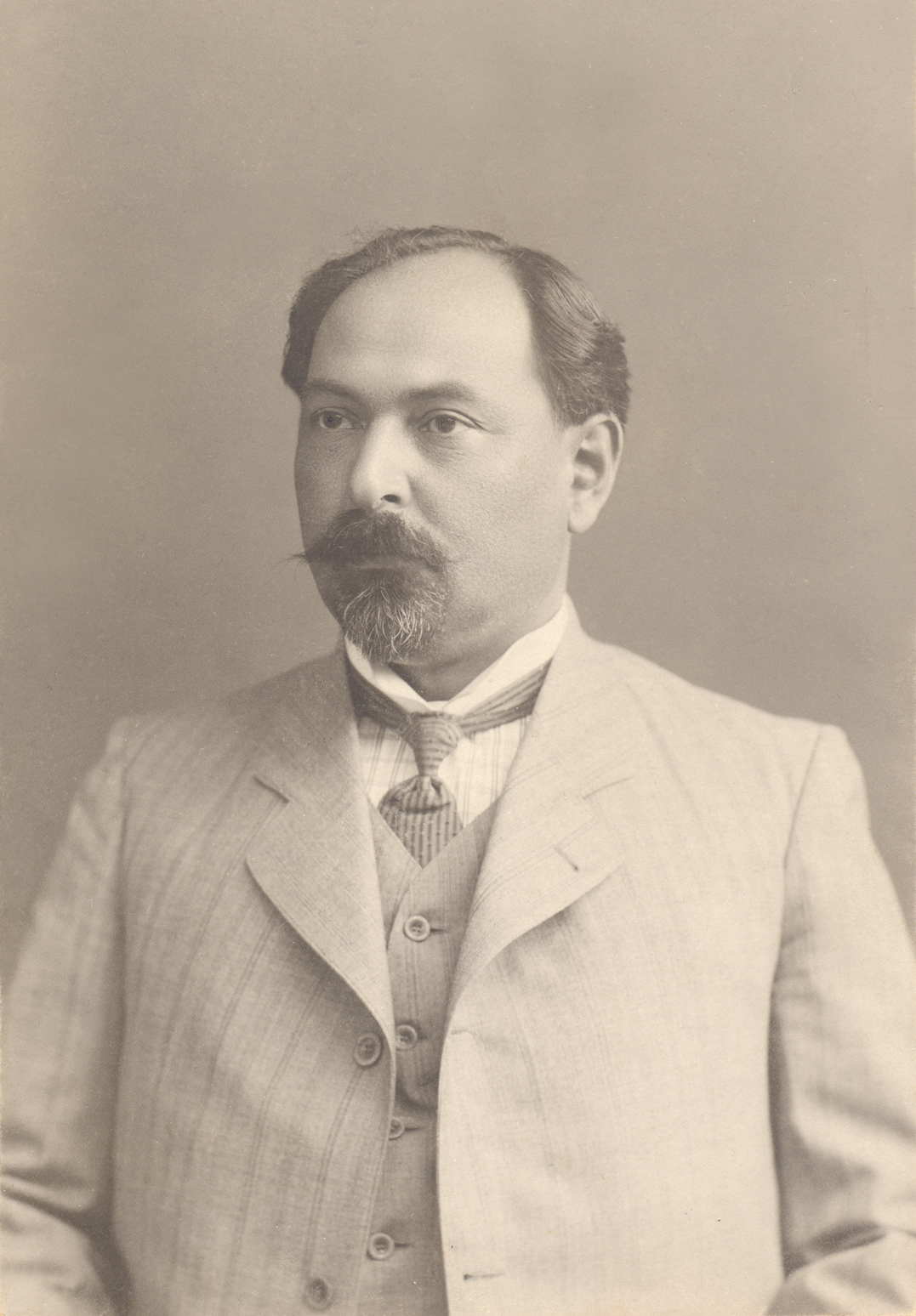
- Narimanov in 1913

Minister of Foreign Affairs of Azerbaijan SSR
- In office May 1920 – 2 May 1921
- President: Grigory Kaminsky (First Secretary of Azerbaijan Communist Party)
- Preceded by: Fatali Khan Khoyski (ADR)
- Succeeded by: Mirza Davud Huseynov

Chairmen of the Council of People's Commissars
- In office May 1921 – April 1922
- Preceded by: Office created
- Succeeded by: Gazanfar Musabekov

Personal details
- Born: 14 April [O.S. 2 April] 1870 Tiflis, Russian Empire
- Died: 19 March 1925 (aged 54) Moscow, Russian SFSR, Soviet Union
- Resting place: Kremlin Wall Necropolis, Moscow
- Party: RSDLP (Bolsheviks) (1905–1918); CPSU (1918–1925)
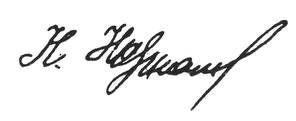
- Signature

Nariman Karbalayi Najaf oghlu Narimanov (Azerbaijani: نریمان کربلایی نجف اوغلی نریمانوف, Nəriman Kərbəlayi Nəcəf oğlu Nərimanov; Russian: Нарима́н Кербелаи Наджа́ф оглы Нарима́нов; 14 April [O.S. 2 April] 1870 – 19 March 1925) was an Azerbaijani Bolshevik revolutionary, writer, publicist, politician and statesman. For just over one year, beginning in May 1920, Narimanov headed the government of the Azerbaijan Soviet Socialist Republic. He was subsequently elected chairman of the Union Council of the Transcaucasian SFSR. He was also Party Chairman of the Central Executive Committee of the Soviet Union from 30 December 1922 until his death.

One of the central districts and one of the busiest metro stations in Baku, together with a number of streets, parks and halls all over Azerbaijan, as well as Azerbaijan Medical University, are named after him. In the Lankaran region, there is a town named Narimanabad in his honor. There are also towns named after him in other post-Soviet states, mainly in Russia.

== Biography ==
=== Early years ===
Nariman Narimanov was born on 14 April (2 April O.S.) 1870 in Tiflis, Georgia, then part of the Russian Empire into an ethnic Azerbaijani family. The Narimanov family were middle-class merchants and were able to send their son to the Gori Teachers Seminary, from which he graduated. Nariman Narimanov moved to Baku in 1891. During this period, he was involved in cultural, educational, literary, and political activities. In 1894, he established the first public national reading room for the Turkic-Muslim community in Baku. The library of the reading room included works from Eastern, Russian, and European literature, and it was enriched with newspapers, magazines, and books donated from cities such as Istanbul, Sofia, Cairo, Tehran, Tabriz, and others. In addition to his journalistic writings, Narimanov also prepared textbooks for students of the Azerbaijani and Russian languages. In 1896, Narimanov began teaching at the real school in Baku and carried out various studies in the field of humanities. In 1902, he passed an external exam and received a diploma from the Baku Boys’ Gymnasium named after Alexander III. In the same year, Narimanov enrolled in the Faculty of Medicine at the Imperial Novorossiya University in Odessa and formed a theater group composed of students during his university years. He later returned to Baku and served as the chairman of the founding commission of the First Congress of Muslim Teachers. In 1906, he went back to Odessa to complete his education. Between 1907 and 1908, his work Nadir Shah was performed in major theaters in the Volga region, Turkestan, the South Caucasus, and Tehran. He went on to attend medical school at "Imperial Novorossiya University" (present-day "Odessa University"), graduating in 1908.

As a young man, Narimanov gained notice as a writer in Azerbaijan even before the revolution of 1905-1907, publishing novels which advocated for the abandonment of tired customs and religious superstitions. He simultaneously taught at a school in the village of Gizel-Adjal, Tiflis Province, where he became closely acquainted with the hard life of the local peasantry. Narimanov was one of the first activists of young Turkic literature. Nariman Narimanov's first literary work was the play “Ignorance” (Cahillik), published in 1894 and staged in Baku in 1895. The proceeds from the play were used to support the development of a reading room. Narimanov also authored several other works, including “Shamdan Bey” (1895), “Bahadır and Sona” (1896–1908), and “Nadir Shah” (1899).“Bahadır and Sona” is regarded as the first national novel in Azerbaijani literature, while “Nadir Shah” is considered to have laid the foundation for the first historical tragedy in Azerbaijani literary tradition.

During the 1905 Revolution, Narimanov joined the Bolshevik party, took an active part and led the student movement in Odessa. He subsequently became one of the organizers of the Social Democratic Party. For these activities, Narimanov was arrested in 1909 and sentenced to five years' internal exile in Astrakhan. N. Narimanov returned to Baku on July 15, 1913. In the city, he worked in various hospitals as a doctor, department head, and administrator, while also continuing his literary and social activities. From April 15 to 20, 1917, he participated in the All-Caucasus Muslim Congress in Baku, guided by the “Hummet” Committee.

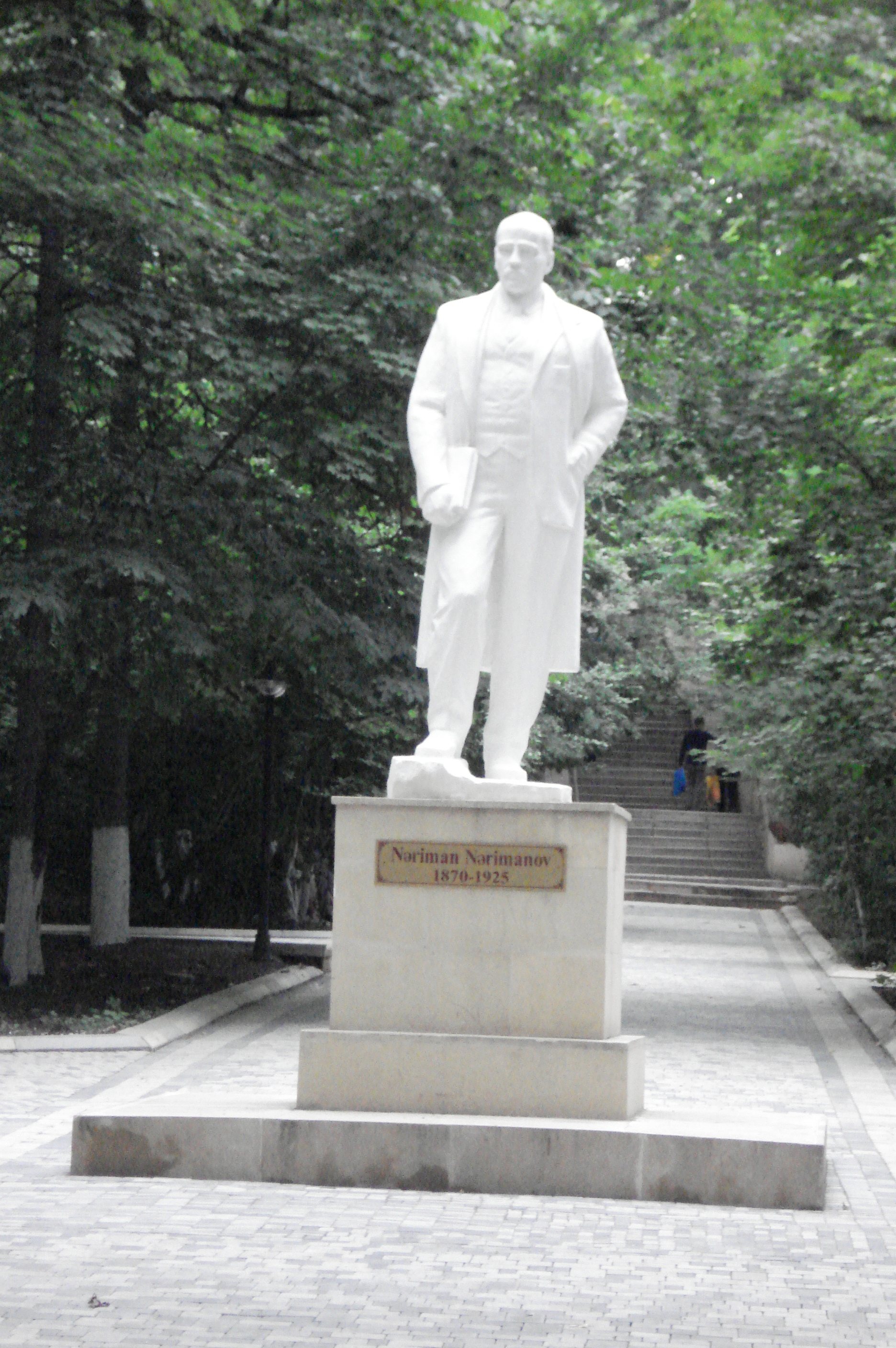
Monument to Narimanov in Qusar

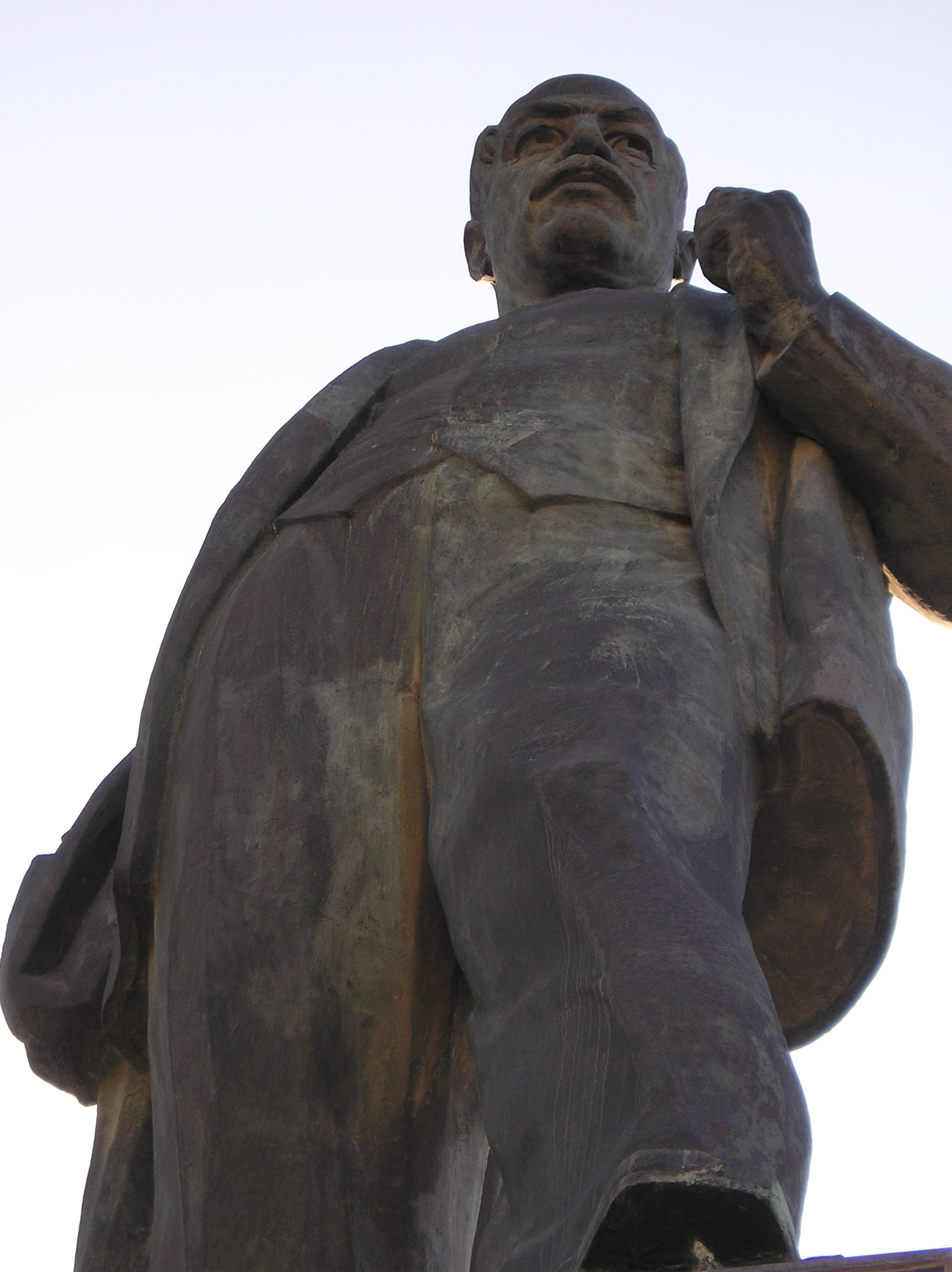
The monument to Nariman Narimanov in Baku.

After the October Revolution of 1917, Nariman Narimanov became the chairman of the Azerbaijani social democratic political party, Hummet (Endeavor), the forerunner of the Communist Party of Azerbaijan. He did not run for election on the Hummet slate, however, and was thus not a member of the Baku Soviet during the brief reign of the Baku Commune of 1918. He was appointed People's Commissar of National Economy by the Baku Soviet, however.

Following the fall of the Baku Soviet, Narimanov managed to escape the city to Astrakhan, thereby avoiding the grim fate of the 26 Baku Commissars. He was there appointed chief of the Near East Division of the People's Commissariat of Foreign Affairs of Soviet Russia, later moving to a position as Deputy People's Commissar in the Commissariat of National Affairs. Narimanov was an advocate of national autonomy within a federated Soviet structure and is widely viewed as being instrumental in the July 1919 decision of the Politburo to recognize Azerbaijan as an independent Soviet Republic.

In 1920, Narimanov was appointed the chairman of the Azerbaijani Revolutionary Committee (Azrevkom) and, shortly thereafter, the Chairman of the Council of People's Commissars' (Sovnarkom) of the Azerbaijani Soviet Republic. In April and May 1922, he took part in the Genoese Conference as a member of the Soviet delegation. In 1922, he was elected the chairman of the Union Council of the Transcaucasian Federation. On 30 December 1922, the first session of the Central Executive Committee of the USSR elected Narimanov as one of the four chairpersons of the Central Executive Committee of the USSR.

In April 1923, Narimanov was elected as a candidate for the Central Committee of the RKP(b) (Russian Communist Party of Bolsheviks). The charismatic moderate nationalist clashed with Joseph Stalin's close associate Sergo Ordzhonikidze, who led the Communist Party in Transcaucasia. As a result of this conflict, Ordzhonikidze had Narimanov transferred to posts in Moscow to remove him from the Caucasus.

=== Death and legacy ===
Narimanov died in bed of a heart attack on 19 March 1925. He was 54 years old at the time of his death. He is buried in Mass Grave No. 7 of the Kremlin Wall Necropolis in Red Square, Moscow.

Leon Trotsky called Narimanov's death the second-biggest loss for the Eastern world after that of Lenin. Sergo Ordzhonikidze described Narimanov as "the greatest representative of our party in the East".

During the Ezhovshchina of the late 1930s, Narimanov was posthumously denounced along with all other members of Hummet for their alleged nationalism. This action was reversed after the liberalization which followed the death of Joseph Stalin in 1953 and Narimanov was again celebrated as a leading figure in the history of Azerbaijani communism, though in 1959, official CPSU policy was still to downplay Narimanov's role and stress that of Shaumian within the Azerbaijani context. It was only in 1972 that Narimanov was fully rehabilitated within his homeland.

Narimanov was survived by his wife Gulsum and by his son Najaf, who joined the Red Army in 1938 and graduated from the Kiev Higher Military Radio-Technical Engineering School in 1940. He became a member of the Communist Party in 1942. During the Great Patriotic War, he was the commander of a tank division and took part in the Battle of Stalingrad and the Battle of the Dnieper before being killed in action near Volnovakha in Ukraine.

- Azerbaijan: Monuments in Baku, Ganja and Sumgayit, cinema, metro station, schools, raion, village streets in Baku also in Imishli (city) and Ganja, Azerbaijan Medical University, Central Park as well as villages of Narimanly in Shamkir and Geranboy and Narimankend in Bilasuvar, Gobustan, Gədəbəy and Sabirabad regions of Azerbaijan, Nariman Narimanov Stadium.
- Belarus: a village in the village hall of Aleksichskom Khoiniki district, Gomel region.
- Georgia: a street (changed its name into Kutaisi in 1932), a museum in Tbilisi (not active anymore), culture center, school, monument and street in Marneuli.
- Kazakhstan: Kostanay Airport (Narimanovka).
- Russia: Narimanov, Astrakhan Oblast, a khutor in Leninskoye Rural Settlement of Zimovnikovsky District of Rostov Oblast, a settlement in Nurlatsky District of the Republic of Tatarstan, a village in Narimanovsky Rural Okrug of Tyumensky District of Tyumen Oblast, raion in Baskhortostan, avenue and the area in Ulyanovsk, culture center in Shatura, streets in Volgograd, Chernyanka Belgorod regions, Kostroma and Moscow, street near railway of Voronezh. Narimanov's name once given to Moscow Institute of Oriental Studies.
- Turkmenistan: a street in Bayramali.
- Ukraine: an alleyway in Odesa, a street in Kharkiv, a village in Kirovohrad Oblast.
- Uzbekistan: a city Payarik was once called as "Narimanovka". A city in Taskhent oblast. Senatoruim.
