= Ethnic minorities in Azerbaijan =

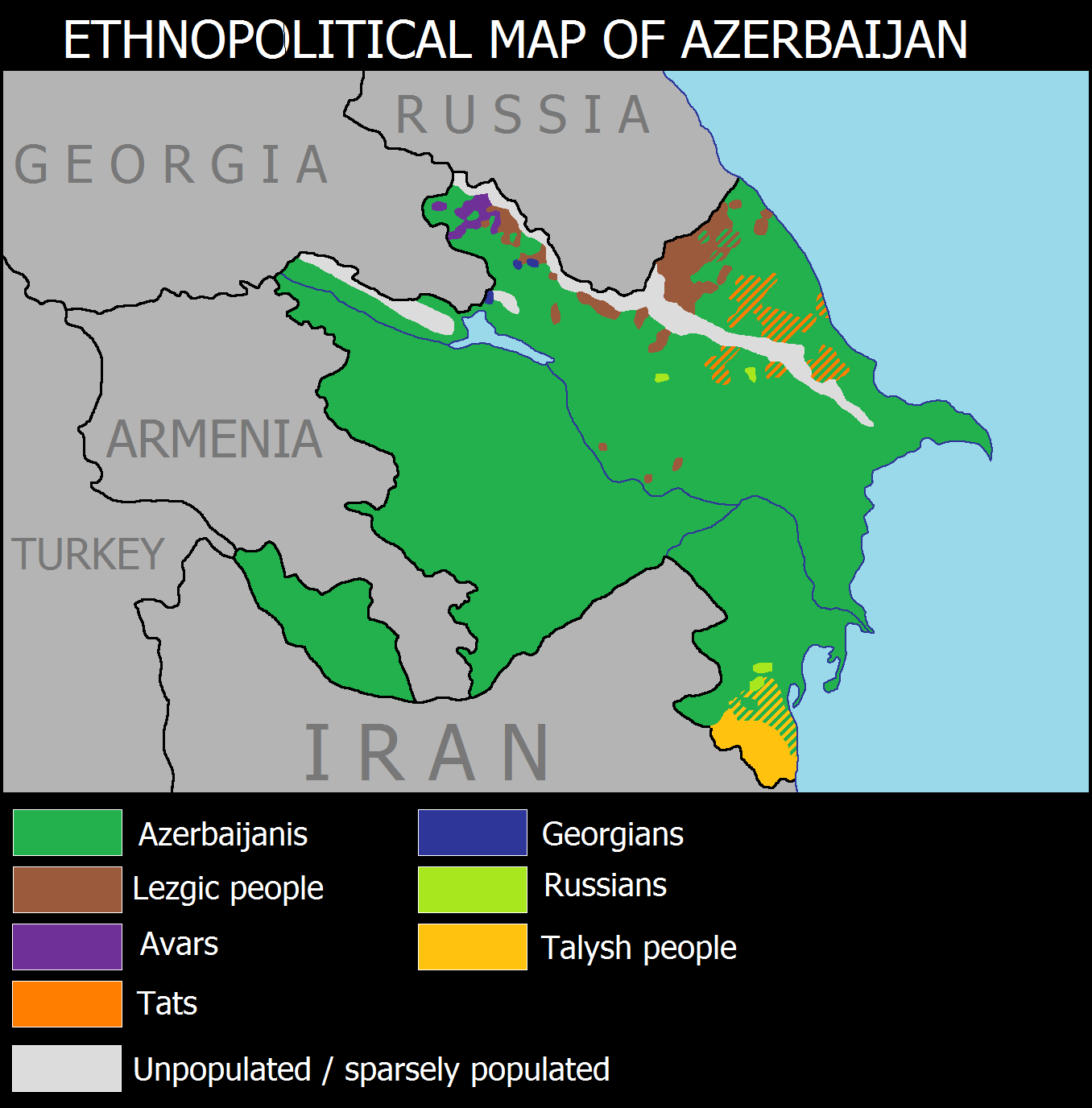
Ethnicities of Azerbaijan (2024, after the collapse of the breakaway Republic of Nagorno-Karabakh and the flight of Nagorno-Karabakh Armenians in 2023).

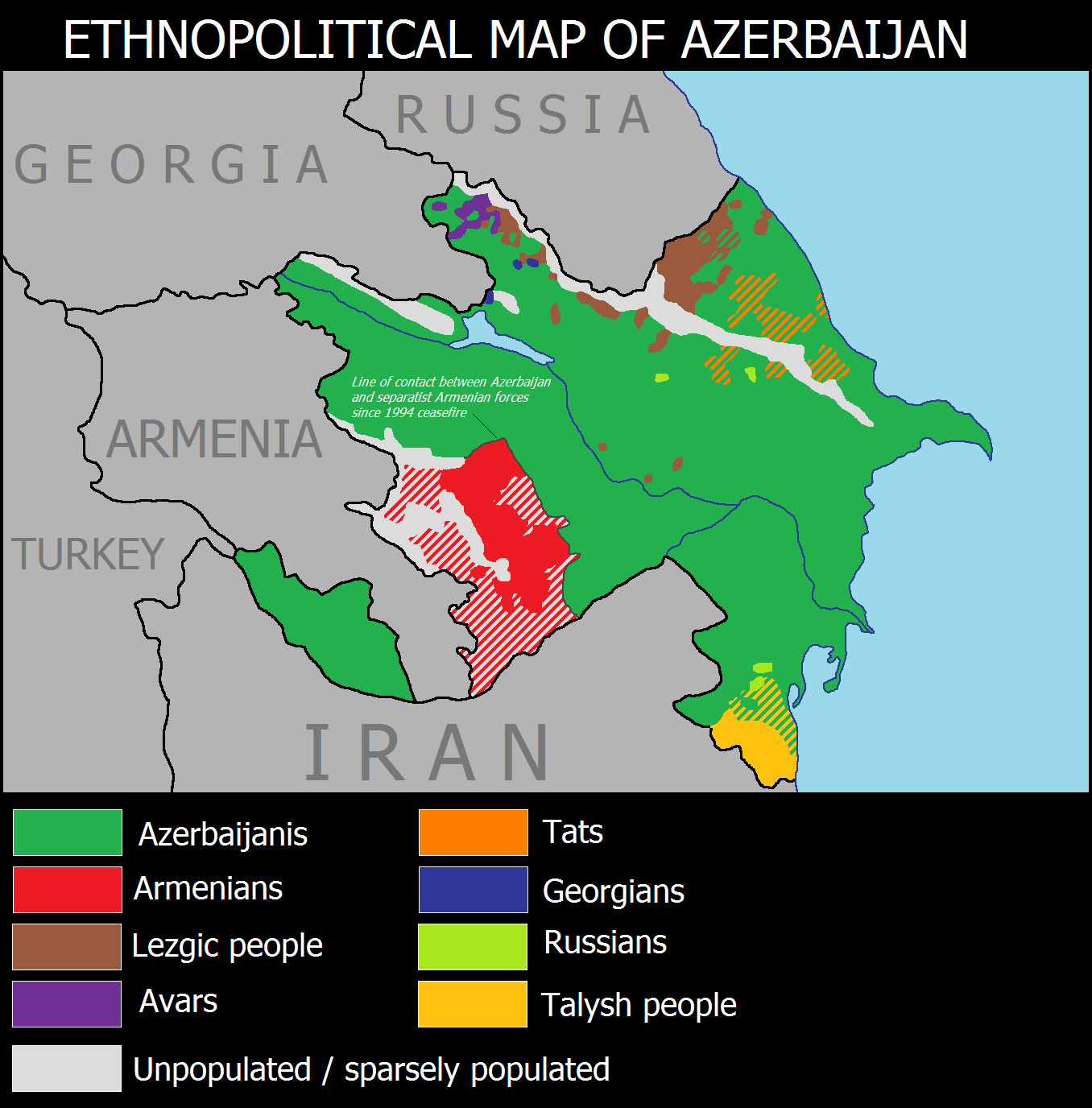
Ethnicities of Azerbaijan (1994-2020, after the First Nagorno-Karabakh War and before the Second Nagorno-Karabakh War).

This article focuses on ethnic minorities in the Republic of Azerbaijan.

== Overview ==
94.8% of the population of Azerbaijan are ethnic Azerbaijanis as of 2019 census. There are more than 80 ethnic groups living in Azerbaijan. The largest of these are Lezgins, Talysh, Russians and Georgians. However, the numbers of most of these ethnic minorities are small.

According to Professor Douglass Blum:

Finally, Azerbaijan presents a somewhat more ambiguous picture. It boasts a well-established official national identity associated with claims of a unique heritage based on an improbable blend of Turkism, Zoroastrianism, moderate Islam, and its historical function as 'bridge' between Asia and Europe along the Silk Road. At the same time there remain strong local allegiances and ethnic distinctions, including submerged tensions between Azeris, Russians, and also Lezgins and Talysh (besides Armenians), as well as stubborn religious cleavages (roughly 85% of the Islamic population is Shi'ite 15% Sunni). This persistence of parochialism is hardly surprising inasmuch as there has been little historical basis for national identity formation among Azeri elites, who were significantly affected by russification and are still generally lukewarm in their expressions of pan-Turkism. Perhaps the most powerful source of social cohesion and stale legitimacy is the war in Nagorno-Karabakh, which has at least generated some degree of collective identity as victim of Armenian aggression perhaps a slender reed on which to construct a national identity conducive to developmental state building in the future.

Freedom House has reported, in July 2005, that some ethnic minorities have encountered discrimination in such areas as housing, education, and employment. The United Nations Committee on the Elimination of Racial Discrimination (CERD) noted that, although Azerbaijan had demonstrated improvements by enacting legislation with provisions for racial discrimination, there had been no discrimination related cases prosecuted. In its summary record, the CERD questioned how such legislation would stem the reportedly discriminatory practices of public officials and law enforcement personnel. The CERD also recommended that Azerbaijan broaden its hitherto narrow understanding of discrimination by not only addressing its "most severe and extreme manifestations" but its commonplace occurrence. Concern over the lack of programs to support minority languages or those fostering inter-cultural education was also expressed by the Committee. Azerbaijan has attempted to curb discrimination by enacting laws., although the

=== Linguistic rights ===
Article 21 ("State Language") of Section II of the Constitution of Azerbaijan states:

*I. The Azerbaijani language shall be the State language of the Republic of Azerbaijan.

- II. The Republic of Azerbaijan shall ensure the development of the Azerbaijani language.
- III. The Republic of Azerbaijan shall guarantee the free use and development of other languages spoken by the population.

Furthermore, Article 45 ("The Right to Use Native Language") of Section III of the Constitution of Azerbaijan states:

*I. Every Person shall have the right to use Native language. Everyone shall have the right to be raised and get an education, be engaged in creative activities in Native Language.

- II. No one can be deprived of the right to use Native Language.

According to the 2007 report by the Council of Europe's Commission against Racism and Intolerance (ECRI):

The languages of national minorities living in Azerbaijan are taught in public schools in regions where these minorities live compactly. In general, two hours a week are devoted to teaching minority languages from the first to the fourth grade. Apart from a great number of Russian schools, especially in the capital city of Baku, there are also some Georgian and Jewish schools in Azerbaijan. ECRI notes that the Azerbaijani authorities have recently made efforts in order to improve the quality of teaching of several minority languages, including Lezgin and Talysh. They have published textbooks in these languages to replace old or foreign textbooks which were not appropriate. However, according to several sources, the textbooks for learning other minority languages such as Tat and Avar are still unsuitable. In addition, there are too few teachers for these minority languages, and the teachers are poorly trained. The Azerbaijani authorities have stated that the Ministry of Education is taking measures to improve the situation with regard to these issues.

According to other reports, there have been several complaints of ethnic unrest in Azerbaijan due to the assimilation politic of the government and its treatment of minorities. Among others the Avars, Talysh, Kurds and Tats.

=== General representation in public and political life ===
According to the Resolution on the implementation of the Framework Convention for the Protection of National Minorities issued by the Council of Europe in 2004:

Azerbaijan has made particularly commendable efforts in opening up the personal scope of application of the Framework Convention to a wide range of minorities. In Azerbaijan, the importance of the protection and promotion of cultures of national minorities is recognised and the long history of cultural diversity of the country is largely valued;

- The Nagorno-Karabakh conflict and its consequences have considerably hampered efforts to implement the Framework Convention. Despite the general spirit of tolerance in Azerbaijan, the continued occupation of large parts of Azerbaijani territory and the displacement of a high number of people have caused tensions which have resulted in disconcerting manifestations of intolerance. It is to be hoped that a lasting and peaceful solution to the existing conflict will be found and that efforts to that effect will be accelerated. The eventual solution should protect the rights of all persons concerned, in conformity with the territorial integrity of the country and other principles of international law;
- Certain general human rights issues - including concerns as regards freedom of expression and the process of registration of non-governmental organisations - have an impact also on the protection of national minorities and need to be addressed by the authorities as a matter of priority;
- Despite certain positive legislative initiatives, there are a number of shortcomings in the legislation pertaining to the implementation of the Framework Convention. The 2002 Law on the State Language contains regrettable reductions in the legal guarantees relating to the protection of national minorities. These put at risk, for example, certain commendable practices in the field of electronic media. The process of amending the said law should be pursued further with a view to making it compatible with the Framework Convention;
- There is a need to couple the Law on the State Language with improved legal guarantees for the protection of national minorities in such fields as minority language education and use of minority languages in relations with administrative authorities, with a view to consolidating and expanding the positive practices that exist. Priority should be given to the adoption of a new law on the protection of national minorities, providing the necessary guarantees for the implementation of the relevant minority language standards;

- Azerbaijan should consider developing further the consultation structures for representatives of national minorities in order to improve their participation in decision-making.

According to the European Commission Against Racism and Intolerance (ECRI), the human right's body of the Council of Europe:

ECRI notes the general view that national minorities are well represented in public and political life and particularly in parliament. However, there is currently no specific public body where representatives of national minorities could express their views on the public affairs of interest to them. It has been so since the disappearance of the Council for National Minorities, which was originally set up in 1993 and which does not meet anymore. According to several sources, national minorities generally hesitate to come forward to claim their linguistic and cultural rights, particularly due to the general climate resulting from the conflict over Nagorno-Karabakh. It seems that those who have tried before to publicly defend national minorities' rights have at the least experienced accusations of “working for the enemy” or of “separatism”, for instance by some media or some politicians.

=== Forced assimilation ===
According to the 1998 book “Linguistic Minorities in Central and Eastern Europe”:

In 1993 there was an attempt officially to restore the Latin script; very few people advocated the Arabic script. Kryzi and Khinalug speakers, as well as most Tsakhurs, are bilingual and tend to assimilate with the Azeris. The same is true of the Tat speakers, and slightly less about the Talysh. At least there is no official recognition, teaching or publishing in these languages in any form. Lezghins in Azerbaijan are struggling very determinedly for their linguistic revival, but with little success. Generally there is a prevailing policy of forceful assimilation of all minorities, including the Talysh, Tat, Kurds and Lezgins. There is little or no resistance to assimilation from the Kryzi, Khinalug, Tsakhurs or Tat, and not much resistance from the Talysh. There are some desperate efforts of resistance from the Udin, stubborn resistance from the Kurds, and an extremely active struggle from the Lezgins, who want to separate Lezgin populated districts both from Dagestan and Azerbaijan in order to create an autonomous republic with Lezgin as the state language.

The Russian expert on the nationalities issue, Valery Tishkov, stated that Azerbaijan is one of the biggest assimilators of the former Soviet republics, the other two being Georgia and Uzbekistan.

According to Radio Free Europe organization's analyst Liz Fuller, several Azerbaijan's ethnic representatives (such as Magomed Guseinov from the Avar National Council) have voiced public concern about forced assimilation and ethnic cleansing in order to ensure the predominance of Azerbaijani Turks in the country over Lezghins, Avars, Talysh, Tats, Kurds and other minorities.

== Armenians ==
The vast majority of Armenians in Azerbaijan lived in Nagorno-Karabakh. However they now number about 20 people, with a sizablely larger number in Azerbaijani prisons. Non-official sources estimate that the number Armenians living on Azerbaijani territory outside Nagorno-Karabakh not in prison is around 2,000 to 3,000, and almost exclusively comprises persons married to Azeris or of mixed Armenian-Azeri descent. The number of Armenians who are likely not married to Azeris and are not of mixed Armenian-Azeri descent are estimated at 645 (36 men and 609 women) and more than half (378 or 59 per cent of Armenians in Azerbaijan outside Nagorno-Karabakh) live in Baku and the rest in rural areas. They are likely to be the elderly and sick, and probably have no other family members. Armenians in Azerbaijan are at a great risk as long as the Nagorno-Karabakh conflict remains unsettled.

=== Azerbaijan SSR ===
During Soviet rule, the question of Karabakh festered for Armenians. The Armenians of Karabakh made claims of economic neglect, charging that Azeri authorities with under-investment in the region in an attempt to keep it impoverished. In addition, Baku placed restrictions on cultural ties with Armenia. Tensions rose in the early 1960s, and in 1968 clashes erupted between Armenians and Azeris in Stepanakert (the capital of Nagorno-Karabakh). The Armenians feared that the Armenian character of Karabakh would disappear as it had in Nakhichevan over the decades, where the Armenian population had disappeared and all of the Armenian monuments were systematically removed and reportedly destroyed by the Azerbaijani authorities. In 1979, Nagorno-Karabakh had a 74% Armenian majority but received no Armenian television broadcasts and had no Armenian institution of higher learning

According to Thomas De Waal:

By 1979, the Armenians of Nakhicvhevan had declined to a level of 1 percent of the population, or three thousand people. The Karabakh Armenians used the example of slow “de-Armenization” of Nakhichevan in the course of the twentieth century as an example of what they feared would happen to them.

However, other evidence suggests that the Armenians lived in better conditions in Nagorno-Karabakh than Azerbaijanis. According to Yamskov,

In Nagorno-Karabakh, for example, the social status of the Armenians in the enclave was higher than that of the Azeris inside and outside the territory.

The Soviet laws ensured that in Nagorno-Karabakh "party and state organs were staffed primarily by Armenians who not only ensured Armenian cultural autonomy with Armenian-language newspapers, schools, and arts but strengthened it"

=== 1991 to 2023 ===
War soon broke out over Nagorno Karabakh and ended in 1994 with the Armenian separatists gaining control over the territory. Turkic nationalism is the leading force in Baku and has undoubtedly contributed to the conflict with the Armenians given the historical enmity between Armenians and Turkey. All the major human rights monitors agreed that the status of Armenians, those married to or those who associate with Armenians, and those who are perceived to be sympathetic to Armenians, is extremely grave. There has also been numerous acts of vandalism against the Armenian Apostolic Church throughout Azerbaijan. The Armenians still remaining in Azerbaijan practically live in virtual hiding, and have also changed their Armenian names and surnames to Azerbaijani names and surnames because they have to maintain an extremely low profile to avoid harassment and physical attacks. They have continued to complain (in private due to fear of attacks) that they remain subject to harassment and human rights violations and therefore have to hide their identity. Armenians and part Armenians living in Azerbaijan were reported as being refused permission to leave the country. They have also reported that the Department of Visas and Registrations took them off of the list of residents.

A 1993 report from the American Embassy in Baku noted:

…those of mixed marriages cannot look to emigrate to Armenia since Azerbaijanis believe that they will be discriminated against just as Armenians are here, and because Yerevan Armenians [ethnic Armenians from Armenia] are openly hostile to Baku Armenians [ethnic Armenians from Azerbaijan], and most Azerbaijani Armenians have no ties to Russia.

According to a 1993 Department of Justice report:

It is clear that Armenians are the target of violence from societal forces and that the Azerbaijani government is unable or in some instances unwilling to control the violence or acts of discrimination and harassment. Some sectors of the government, such as the Department of Visas and Registrations mentioned above, appear unwilling to enforce the governments stated policy on minorities. As long as the Armenian-Azeri conflict over the fate of Karabakh continues, and possibly long after a settlement is reached, Armenian inhabitants of Azerbaijan will have no guarantees of physical safety.

Azerbaijan has been accused of embarking on a campaign beginning in 1998 to completely destroy the vast cemetery of medieval Armenian khachkar gravestones in the archeological site of Julfa, Nakhchivan, an exclave of Azerbaijan. Claims by Armenians that Azerbaijan had undertaken a systematic campaign to destroy and remove the monuments first arose in late 1998, and those charges were renewed in 2002 and again in December 2005 following the final destruction of the site.

Numerous appeals were filed by both Armenian and international organizations, condemning the Azerbaijani government and demanding it desist from such activity. In 2006, Azerbaijan barred European Parliament members from investigating the claims, charging them with a "biased and hysterical approach" to the issue and stating that it would only accept a delegation if it visited Armenian-controlled territory as well.

According to European Commission against Racism and Intolerance (ECRI) 2011 Report on Azerbaijan "the constant negative official and media discourse concerning the Republic of Armenia helps to sustain a negative climate of opinion regarding people of Armenian origin, who remain vulnerable to discrimination."

=== 2023 to present ===
In September 2023, Azerbaijan launched an offensive against the Republic of Nagorno-Karabakh. The war ended with the capitulation of the Republic of Nagorno-Karabakh, which resulted in the mass escape of almost the entire population of Nagorno-Karabakh to Armenia.

== Kurds ==
The presence of Kurds in Azerbaijan dates back to the 18th century. The area between Karabakh and Zangezur became inhabited by nomadic Kurdish tribes in the early nineteenth century, when a new wave of Kurdish migrants numbering 600 families led by Mihamed Sefi Siltan moved to the Karabakh Khanate from Persia. A smaller number of them also moved here in 1885 from the Ottoman Empire.

There were some 41,000 Kurds residing in Azerbaijan during the Soviet era. Local Kurds had always been on good terms with the Azerbaijani majority, a Kurdish radio station, newspaper and numerous schools attempt to keep Kurdish culture alive, but fewer families bother to teach their mother tongue.

According to Thomas de Waal:

Smaller nationalities, such as Kurds, also complained of assimilation. In the 1920s, Azerbaijan's Kurds had their own region, known as Red Kurdistan, to the west of Nagorny Karabakh; in 1930, it was abolished and most Kurds were progressively recategorized as "Azerbaijani." A Kurdish leader estimates that there are currently as many as 200,000 Kurds in Azerbaijan, but official statistics record only about 12,000.

The geographical areas of concentration of Kurds in Azerbaijan were Kelbajar, Lachin, Qubadli and Zangilan districts, sandwiched between Armenia and the Nagorno-Karabakh region of Azerbaijan. In the course of the First Nagorno-Karabakh War, these regions came under occupation of the Armenian forces. As a result, Kurds along with the entire Azerbaijani population of these regions were displaced to other parts of Azerbaijan.

By the 1920s, the Kurdish community in Azerbaijan was considerably diminished, when many of them moved to Armenia where Kurdish villages were created. About the same time Azerbaijan's Kurds had their own region called Red Kurdistan in the Lachin region, which was to the West of Karabakh. In fact, Lachin with the principal towns Kalbajar, Qubadli and Zangilan and the administrative sub-divisions of Karakushlak, Koturli, Murad-Khanli and Kurd-Haji were mostly inhabited by Kurds. In 1930 it was abolished and most remaining Kurds were progressively recategorized as Azerbaijani. In late 1930s Soviet authorities deported most of the Kurdish population of Azerbaijan and Armenia to Kazakhstan, and Kurds of Georgia also became victims of Stalin’s purges in 1944.

The problem is that the historical record of the Kurds in Azerbaijan is filled with lacunae. For instance, in 1979 there was according to the census no Kurds recorded. Not only did Turkey and Azerbaijan pursue an identical policy against the Kurds, they even employed identical techniques like forced assimilation, manipulation of population figures, settlement of non-Kurds in areas predominantly Kurdish, suppression of publications and abolition of Kurdish as a medium of instruction in schools. Kurdish historical figures such as Sharaf Khan of Bitlis and Ahmad Khani and the Shaddadid dynasty as a whole were described as Azeris. Kurds who retained 'Kurdish' as their nationality on their internal passports as opposed to 'Azeri' were unable to find employment.

== Talysh ==
According to a 1926 census, there were 77,039 in Azerbaijan SSR. From 1959 to 1989, the Talysh were not included as a separate ethnic group in any census, but rather they were included as part of the Turkic-speaking Azerbaijani's, although the Talysh speak an Iranian language. In 1999, the Azerbaijani government claimed there were only 76,800 Talysh in Azerbaijan, but this is believed to be an under-representation given the problems with registering as a Talysh. Some claim that the population of the Talysh inhabiting the southern regions of Azerbaijan is 500,000. Talysh nationalists have always asserted that the number of Talysh in Azerbaijan is substantially higher than the official statistics.

Obtaining accurate statistics is difficult, due to the unavailability of reliable sources, intermarriage, and the decline of the Talysh language. and Radio Free Europe/Radio Liberty have voiced their concerns about the arrest of Novruzali Mamedov, Chairman of the Talysh Cultural Centre and editor-in-chief of the "Tolyshi Sado" newspaper.

=== In Azerbaijan SSR ===
The Talysh identity was strongly suppressed during Soviet times. In the early Soviet period, there were Talysh medium schools, a newspaper called "Red Talysh", and several Talysh language books published, but by end of the 1930s these schools were closed and the Talysh identity was not acknowledged in official statistics, with the Talysh being classified as "Azerbaijani".

=== From 1991 to present ===
Historical repression of identity and the inability to practice their culture and language has led the Talysh to an internalized self repression. This makes it hard to gauge support for any type of Talysh movement. According to Hema Kotecha, many Talysh fear being associated with the separatist Talysh-Mughan Autonomous Republic, with Russia, or with Armenia if they acknowledged or attempted to talk about their beliefs in the public sphere. One instance of current repression was when a school in Lerik wanted to invite a poet from Lenkoran to have a party in his honor and for him to speak to Children; the headmaster was told that he would be dismessed if the event went ahead. The fear of the police is also another factor to this silence, although support for a secular democracy and shared Azerbaijani-Talysh feelings towards Nagorno-Karabakh contribute as well.

== Lezgins ==
Lezgins are the largest ethnic minority in Azerbaijan. The UNHCR states that Lezgins make up 40% of the populations of the Qusar and Khachmaz regions and that Greater Baku is 1.8% Lezgin. Official Azerbaijani government statistics state that the Lezgin population is only 2% of the total population of the country, bringing the number to 178,000, however, this figure could be up to double. Arif Yunus suggests that the figure is closer to 250,000-260,000, while some Lezgin nationalists claim that they number more than 700,000. Qusar town is approximately 90 to 95% Lezgin according to the local NGO Helsinki Committee office.

According to the Center for International Development and Conflict Management at the University of Maryland:

Although many feared that Lezgin demands for the creation of an independent "Lezgistan" would result in another secessionist war in Azerbaijan, these fears have thus far proved to be unwarranted. It currently appears less likely than ever that the Lezgins will resort to any sustained collective action to address their grievances, although isolated incidents do occur. In the past eight years, they have not engaged in any serious protests and only two incidents of violence; they have also shown a willingness to negotiate and compromise on their most intractable demands. The Lezgin nationalist movements do not receive wide support among the Lezgin people who are not well-organized at the grass-roots level

According to Thomas de Waal:

Although there are no discriminatory policies against them on the personal level, the Lezghins* campaign for national-cultural autonomy is vehemently rejected by the Azerbaijani authorities. Daghestani Lezghins fear that the continued existence of their ethnic kin in Azerbaijan as a distinct community is threatened by what they consider Turkic nationalistic policies of forceful assimilation. Inter-ethnic tensions between Lezghins and Azeris spilled over from Azerbaijan to Daghestan also. They started in 1992 when the Popular Front came to power in Azerbaijan, but reached a peak in mid-1994, the time of heavy losses on the Karabakh front. In May that year violent clashes occurred in Derbent (Daghestan), and in June in the Gussary region of Azerbaijan. Since then the situation has stabilised, although Azerbaijani authorities allege a link between Lezghin activists and Karabakh Armenians and a cloud of suspicion surrounds the Lezghin community in Azerbaijan.

According to Svante E. Cornell:

Where as officially the number of Lezgins registered as such in Azerbaijan is around 180,000 the Lezgins claim that the number of Lezgins registered in Azerbaijan is much higher than this figure, some accounts showing over 700,000 Lezgins in Azerbaijan. These figures are denied by the Azerbaijani government, but in private many Azeris acknowledge the fact that the Lezgins – for that matter the Talysh or the Kurdish-population of Azerbaijan is far higher than the official figures...

For the Lezgins in Azerbaijan, the existence of ethnic kin in Dagestan is of high importance. Nariman Ramazanov, one of the Lezgin political leaders, has argued that whereas the Talysh, Tats, and Kurds of Azerbaijan lost much of their language and ethnic identity, the Lezgins have been able to preserve theirs by their contacts with Dagestan, where there was naturally no policy of Azeri assimilation. …. The Lezgin problem remains one of the most acute and unpredictable of the contemporary Caucasus. This said, the conditions for a peaceful resolution of the conflict are present. No past conflict nor heavy mutual prejudices make management of the conflict impossible; nor has ethnic mobilization taken place to a significant extent. Hence there are no actual obstacles to a de-escalation of the conflict at the popular level. At the political level, however, the militancy of Sadval and the strict position of the Azeri government give cause for worry, and may prevent the settlement of the conflict through a compromise such as a freetrading zone. The Lezgin problem needs to be monitored and followed in closer detail, and its continued volatility is proven by the tension surrounding a recent

Lezgin congress in Dagestan.

== Russians ==
Russians are the second largest ethnic minority in Azerbaijan and is also the largest Russian community in the South Caucasus and one of the largest outside of Russia. Since their arrival at the end of the eighteenth century, the Russians have played an important role in all spheres of life, particularly during the Czarist and Soviet period, especially in the capital the city of Baku.

The events of Black January, the economic downturn, and the war with Armenia, coupled with growing pessimism and psychological discomfort, and pressure from the Azerbaijani refugees from Armenia and Azeri internally displaced persons from Nagorno-Karabakh and adjacent territories, led to the exodus of Russian-speaking population of Azerbaijan. Between 1989 and 1999, the numbers of the Russian population fell from 392,000 to 142,000. As of 2009, the Russian population numbered 119,300 people.

Like with many minorities since the Soviet times, Azerbaijan maintains 17 Russian-language schools in the areas where the Russians live, as well as the major cities such as Baku.

A representative of the Molokan (ethnic Russian) community, in an interview on July 21, 2005, reported that there is no conflict between ethnic Russians and Azeris in Azerbaijan and that "there is no intolerance to the Russian language, culture or people" according to a parliamentary official. Similarly, Interfax News Service, on July 6, 2004, reported that a Russian Foreign Ministry representative stated, "We, Russians, have no particular problems in Azerbaijan".

== Demographics ==
Ethnic Groups as of 2019 census
1. Azerbaijanis (94.8%)
2. Lezgins (1.68%)
3. Russians (0.70%)
4. Armenians (0.00%)
5. Talyshs (0.88%)
6. Avars (0.49%)
7. Turks (0.35%)
8. Tatars (0.18%)
9. Tats (0.28%)
10. Ukrainians (0.14%)
11. Tsakhurs (0.13%)
12. Udis (0.04%)
13. Georgians (0.11%)
14. Jews (0.10%)
15. Kurds (0.07%)
16. Others (0.16%)

According to the 2019 census, ethnic minorities in Azerbaijan represent 5.2% of the population, including Lezgins (the largest minority group, making up 1.7% of the population), Russians (0.7%) and others, such as Talysh, Tats (Muslims and Judeo-Tats), Avars, Georgians, and Ashkenazi Jews, which comprise the remaining 2.8%.

While Azerbaijanis formed a consistent majority, it is worth noting that there was a shift in the demographic trends in modern Azerbaijan even before the collapse of the Soviet Union and the First Nagorno-Karabakh War, that lead to an exodus of some ethnic minorities, notably the Armenians and Russians, and conversely a large influx of Azerbaijani refugees from Armenia and Azerbaijani internally displaced persons from Nagorno-Karabakh and adjacent territories, thus giving Azerbaijan a more homogeneous character.

Population of Azerbaijan according to ethnic group 1926–2009
| Ethnic group | Census 1926^{1} | | Census 1939^{2} | | Census 1959^{3} | | Census 1970^{4} | | Census 1979^{5} | | Census 1989^{6} | | Census 1999^{6} | | Census 2009 | | Census 2019 | |
| Ethnic group | Number | % | Number | % | Number | % | Number | % | Number | % | Number | % | Number | % | Number | % | Number | % |
|---|---|---|---|---|---|---|---|---|---|---|---|---|---|---|---|---|---|---|
| Azerbaijan | 1,437,977 | 62.1 | 1,870,471 | 58.4 | 2,494,381 | 67.5 | 3,776,778 | 73.8 | 4,708,832 | 78.1 | 5,804,980 | 82.7 | 7,205,464 | 90.6 | 8,172,800 | 91.6 | 9,436,123 | 94.8 |
| Lezgins | 37,263 | 1.6 | 111,666 | 3.5 | 98,211 | 2.7 | 137,250 | 2.7 | 158,057 | 2.6 | 171,395 | 2.4 | 178,021 | 2.2 | 180,300 | 2.02 | 167,570 | 1.68 |
| Armenian | 282,004 | 12.2 | 388,025 | 12.1 | 442,089 | 12.0 | 483,520 | 9.4 | 475,486 | 7.9 | 390,505 | 5.6 | 120,745^{8} | 1.5 | 120,300^{8} | 1.35 | 178 | |
| Russians | 220,545 | 9.5 | 528,318 | 16.5 | 501,282 | 13.6 | 510,059 | 10.0 | 475,255 | 7.9 | 392,304 | 5.6 | 141,687 | 1.8 | 119,300 | 1.35 | 71,046 | 0.7 |
| Talysh | 77,323 | 3.3 | 87,510 | 2.7 | 85 | 0.0 | | | | | 21,169 | 0.3 | 76,841 | 1.0 | 112,000 | 1.26 | 87,578 | 0.88 |
| Avars | 19,104 | 0.8 | 15,740 | 0.5 | 17,254 | 0.5 | 30,735 | 0.6 | 35,991 | 0.6 | 44,072 | 0.6 | 50,871 | 0.6 | 49,800 | 0.56 | 48,636 | 0.49 |
| Turks | 95 | 0.0 | 600 | 0.0 | 202 | 0.0 | 8,491 | 0.2 | 7,926 | 0.1 | 17,705 | 0.3 | 43,454 | 0.5 | 38,000 | 0,43 | 30,516 | 0.35 |
| Tatars | 9,948 | 0.4 | 27,591 | 0.9 | 29,370 | 0.8 | 31,353 | 0.6 | 31,204 | 0.5 | 28,019 | 0.4 | 30,011 | 0.4 | 25,900 | 0,29 | 17,712 | 0.18 |
| Tat and Judeo-Tats | 28,443 | 1.2 | 2,289 | 0.1 | 5,887 | 0.2 | 7,769 | 0.2 | 8,848 | 0.1 | 10,239 | 0.1 | 10,922 | 0.1 | 25,200 | 0.28 | 27,657 | 0.28 |
| Ukrainians | 18,241 | 0.8 | 23,643 | 0.7 | 25,778 | 0.7 | 29,160 | 0.6 | 26,402 | 0.4 | 32,345 | 0.5 | 28,984 | 0.4 | 21,500 | 0,24 | 13,947 | 0.14 |
| Tsakhurs | 15,552 | 0.7 | 6,464 | 0.2 | 2,876 | 0.1 | 6,208 | 0.1 | 8,546 | 0.1 | 13,318 | 0.2 | 15,877 | 0.2 | 12,300 | 0.14 | 13,361 | 0.13 |
| Udins | 2,445 | 0.1 | 6,464 | 0.2 | 3,202 | 0.1 | 5,492 | 0.1 | 5,841 | 0.1 | 6,125 | 0.1 | 4,152 | 0.1 | 3,800 | 0.04 | 3,540 | 0.04 |
| Georgians | 9,500 | 0.4 | 10,196 | 0.3 | 9,526 | 0.3 | 13,595 | 0.3 | 11,412 | 0.2 | 14,197 | 0.2 | 14,877 | 0.2 | 9,900 | 0.11 | 8,442 | 0.08 |
| Jews | 20,578 | 0.9 | 41,245 | 1.3 | 40,198 | 1.1 | 48,652 | 1.0 | 35,487 | 0.6 | 30,792 | 0.4 | 8,916 | 0.1 | 9,100 | 0.1 | 5,094 | 0.05 |
| Kurds | 41,193^{7} | 1.8 | 6,005 | 0.2 | 1,487 | 0.0 | 5,488 | 0.1 | 5,676 | 0.1 | 12,226 | 0.2 | 13,075 | 0.2 | 6,100 | 0.07 | 4,105 | 0.04 |
| Others | 94,360 | 4.1 | 85,387 | 2.7 | 25,889 | 0.7 | 22,531 | 0.4 | 31,552 | 0.5 | 31,787 | 0.5 | 9,541 | 0.1 | 9,500 | 0.11 | 15,904 | 0.16 |
| Total | 2,314,571 | | 3,205,150 | | 3,697,717 | | 5,117,081 | | 6,026,515 | | 7,021,178 | | 7,953,438 | | 8,922,400 | | 9,951,409 | |
^{1} Source: . ^{2} Source: . ^{3} Source: . ^{4} Source: . ^{5} Source: . ^{6} Source: . ^{7} Source Almost all Kurds lived in Kurdistan Uyezd, the territory between Armenia and Nagorno Karabakh. In the late 1930s Soviet authorities deported most of the Kurdish population of Azerbaijan to Kazakhstan. ^{8} Almost all Armenians live in the break-away region of Nagorno Karabakh since the early 1990s to flight of Nagorno-Karabakh Armenians in 2023.

== Foreign Interference ==
Azerbaijan has claimed that neighboring countries – Armenia, Iran, and, to a lesser extent, Russia – support separatist sentiments in Azerbaijan.

=== Armenia ===
In May 2005, Armenia organized the "First International Conference on Talysh Studies". The event was hosted by the Yerevan State University's Iranian Studies Department and the Yerevan-based Center for Iranian Studies in Armenian resort town of Tsaghkadzor. According to Vladimir Socor:

Almost certainly, some political circles in Armenia were behind this initiative. The conference appeared designed at least in part to resurrect the issue of autonomy for the Talysh ethnic group in Azerbaijan. Such intentions draw inspiration from the would-be "Talysh-Mugan Republic," declared on June 21, 1993, in southeastern Azerbaijan by a group of ethnic Talysh officers under the leadership of Colonel Alikram Gumbatov. Their rebellion was correlated with a massive Armenian offensive on the Karabakh front and seizure of territories deep inside western Azerbaijan by Armenian forces. The Talysh rebels proclaimed the independence of a seven-district area in southeastern Azerbaijan, but did not elicit significant support among their own ethnic group.

In April 1996, Azerbaijan's National Security Ministry claimed that Armenian intelligence recruited and trained Armenian members of the Daghestan-based Lezgin separatist organization "Sadval" who subsequently perpetrated a bomb attack on the Baku metro in March 1994 that killed 14 people.

=== Iran ===
According to Hema Kotecha:

In the early years of independence, Iran took a paternalistic approach towards Azerbaijan, there were some ideas of integrating Azerbaijan to Iran and "Iran expected/pretended that Azerbaijan was a very unhappy place"... Stories about pressure put on Tehran by the US through sponsoring its minorities and dissenting groups increases its sense of insecurity and the pressure it puts on Baku not to support the US. Part of Iran’s leverage over Azerbaijan is religious influence over society and at moments of tension local observers say they perceive an increased involvement of "Iranian propaganda", Iran pulling on its strings of influence over people in the south.
