= Sadval (movement) =

Political movement in Russia post-1991

- Sədvəl
- Lezgian movement flag
- Founding leader: Mukhiddin Kakhrimanov
- Dates active: 1991
- Country: Azerbaijan; Russia
- Ideology: lezghin nationalism, Irredentism, Autonomy
- Status: active (discreet)

The Sadval movement, or simply Sadval (Sədvəl; Lezgian: Садвал; lit. 'Unity') is a Lezgin political movement initially founded to address the perceived discrimination and marginalization of their community in Azerbaijan. Formed in July 1990 in Dagestan, the Sadval movement addressed issues important to both Russian and Azerbaijani Lezgins. Around the same time, prior to the imminent breakup of the former Soviet Union, other ethnic minority groups in the region began to assert their own cultural and political identities.

The origins of the Sadval Organization can be traced to the breakup of the Soviet Union in 1991. Its goals were to reunify Azerbaijani and Russian Lezgins, and to create a Lezgin republic as part of the Russian Federation. The organization has ties to Russia. The proposal of such a separate region was rejected by Azerbaijan.

At a 1996 congress in Makhachkala, the organization officially abandoned its call for irredentism and admitted that its claims had inadvertently created a rift between Azerbaijanis and Lezgins. The Sadval Organization became somewhat dormant in the late 1990s, and experienced a significant decline in influence during the 2000s. Russia, however, has periodically reinvigorated its ties to Sadval. The movement has been banned in Azerbaijan.

== Origins ==
=== Samur ===
At the time of Sadval's establishment in 1990, a more moderate Lezgin organization known as Samur was founded in Azerbaijan. This group was founded with the aim of obtaining greater cultural autonomy for the Lezgin citizens of Azerbaijan. Although initially more moderate than Sadval, Samur radicalized due to negligence by the Azerbaijani government. By October 1992, after the proclamation of an independent state by the Congress of the Lezgins, the Azerbaijani and Russian Lezgins in Dagestan realized that their views on the Lezgin movement differed greatly.

=== Sadval ===
==== The movement ====
The Sadval movement's Lezgin activists sought to address the perceived discrimination and marginalization of their community in Azerbaijan. They argued that without the unification of the Lezgins in Dagestan and Azerbaijan, the Lezgins were unable to maximize their cultural, political, and socio-economic potential. Members of the organization viewed the newly created state border between Russia and Azerbaijan (as a result of the dissolution of the Soviet Union) a deliberate division of the Lezgin's ethnic territories.

For the Lezgin community in Azerbaijan, this process was instigated due to a number of grievances, including the lack of representation in the government and the suppression of their language and culture. In response, Sadval was formed to advocate the rights of their community and eventually promote the development of a distinct Lezgin national identity outside Azerbaijan.

The Lezgins of Azerbaijan were deemed more radical than those in Dagestan, and did not shy from threatening Azerbaijan with violence. The radical separatist movement of Lezgins was unable to gain a large following, as during Soviet hegemony over Azerbaijan the Lezgin and Azeri communities had converged. Nevertheless, as a result of Sadval's efforts, as of 1994, the Lezgins were allowed special representatives in the Azerbaijani National Parliament. Sadval held direct territorial claims towards Azerbaijan. On one hand, as a result of the ongoing First Nagorno-Karabakh War, the Sadval threat to the Azerbaijani state and nation was overestimated. On the other hand, the claims of separatist groups in Azerbaijan (such as Sadval) questioned the territorial pillars of Azerbaijani nationhood—the very same pillars that had been focal for the foundation of Soviet Azerbaijani identity. Krista A. Goff explains that some scholars do note that Sadval's claims to territory, in tandem with the movement of the Talysh people (see also Talysh-Mughan Autonomous Republic) in the southern part of Azerbaijan, contributed to the shift from ethnic nationalism to territorial nationalism in Azerbaijan.

==== Formal organization ====
The Sadval Organization, formally created in 1991, has played a significant role in promoting an autonomous, federalist state of Russia for the Russian and Azerbaijani Lezgin minority. This proposed state would be created by the adjustment of the borders between Russia and Azerbaijan, so that a Lezgin autonomous region could be established. The organization has ties to Russia, and Azerbaijan has accused Russia of being the main factor behind the founding of the group.

In 1994, Azerbaijan accused Sadval of orchestrating the 1994 Baku Metro bombings. Subsequently, Sadval was labeled a terrorist organization and accused of cooperating with Armenian secret intelligence units. Members of Sadval were arrested, and handed lengthy prison terms and death sentences. Sadval was banned afterward in Azerbaijan. Azerbaijan views Russia as the main factor behind Sadval, because Sadval is officially registered in Russia (which Azerbaijan views as tacit support). According to Jeffrey Mankoff, Russian intelligence supported Sadval in the early 1990s and the Sadval Organization was responsible for the 1994 metro bombings. However, Russia has never officially supported Sadval, doubtlessly due to itself having been affected by Lezgin separatist activity in Dagestan.

In 1996, at a congress in Makhachkala, the organization officially abandoned its territorial aspersions. Sadval became quite dormant by the late 1990s. It declined in the 2000s due to efforts of the Azerbaijani law enforcement and lessened Russian interest in the group. Russia reinvigorated its ties to Sadval when its relations with Azerbaijan soured around the 2008 Russo-Georgian War. In 2012, Sadval organized conferences in Russia, and supported a number of Internet portals and newspapers, which forwarded its original ideas of the 1990s. The leader of Sadval, Nazim Hajiyev, was killed in 2016.

== Political activism ==
Since its founding, Sadval has played a central role in the political and social life of the Lezgin community in Azerbaijan. The movement has organized numerous protests and demonstrations in an attempt to demand greater recognition, autonomy, representation, and even independence. The chairman of Sadval, Mukhiddin Kakhrimanov, threatens to use "...all forms and methods of struggle..." to achieve independence for Lezgins.

Despite its efforts to advocate for the rights of Lezgin nationalism, Sadval has faced significant challenges and obstacles. The movement and its members has been met with resistance, backlash from the government and other political groups, and violence. In the early 2000s, several members of Sadval were arrested and imprisoned on charges of plotting to overthrow the government. This led to widespread protests and international condemnation.

Sadval has continued to play a significant role in the political landscape for the Lezgin ethnic group. In recent years, the movement has sought to engage in dialogue with the government and other political groups in an effort to find a peaceful resolution to the issues facing the Lezgin community. Sadval has worked to build bridges with other minority groups in the country and to promote a sense of unity and solidarity among Azerbaijan's diverse population. In addition to advocacy, Sadval has actively promoted the cultural and linguistic heritage of the Lezgin community. The movement has supported the development of Lezgin-language media, including radio and television programs, as well as the publication of books and other materials in the Lezgin language. It has played a key role in supporting the preservation of traditional Lezgin customs and practices, including music, dance, and other forms of cultural expression.

== See also ==
- Separatism in Europe
- Lezgins in Azerbaijan
- Caucasian Albania

== Sources ==
- Gasimov, Zaur (2018). Historical Dictionary of Azerbaijan (new ed.). Rowman & Littlefield Publishers.
- Goff, Krista A. (2021). Nested Nationalism: Making and Unmaking Nations in the Soviet Caucasus. Cornell University Press. ISBN 978-1501753299.
- Khansari Fard, Fahimeh; Basiri, Mohammad Ali; Yazdani, Enayatollah (2019). "Ethnic Bargaining and Separatism in the South Caucasus". Region. 8 (2): 173–196. doi:10.1353/reg.2019.0011. JSTOR 26899264. S2CID 214442905.
- Mankoff, Jeffrey (2017). ""Un-Civil Society" and the Sources of Russian Influence in West Asia: The South Caucasus". In Kamrava, Mehran (ed.). The Great Game in West Asia: Iran, Turkey and the South Caucasus. Oxford University Press. p. 108. ISBN 978-0190869663.
- Sayfutdinova, Leyla (2022). "Ethnic Boundaries and Territorial Borders: On the Place of Lezgin Irredentism in the Construction of National Identity in Azerbaijan". Nationalities Papers. 50 (4): 794–812. doi:10.1017/nps.2021.3. hdl:10023/23933. S2CID 236600082.
