= Nazim Hajiyev (activist) =

Nazim Hajiyev or Nazim Gadzhiyev (Lezgian: Назим Гаджиев, 1944-2016) was an activist and leader of the Lezgin movement "Sadval" (Unity), advocating for the autonomy or independence of the Lezgin people. He was murdered in 2016.
