= Nərimanov raion =

Settlement in Azerbaijan

Nərimanov
- Raion
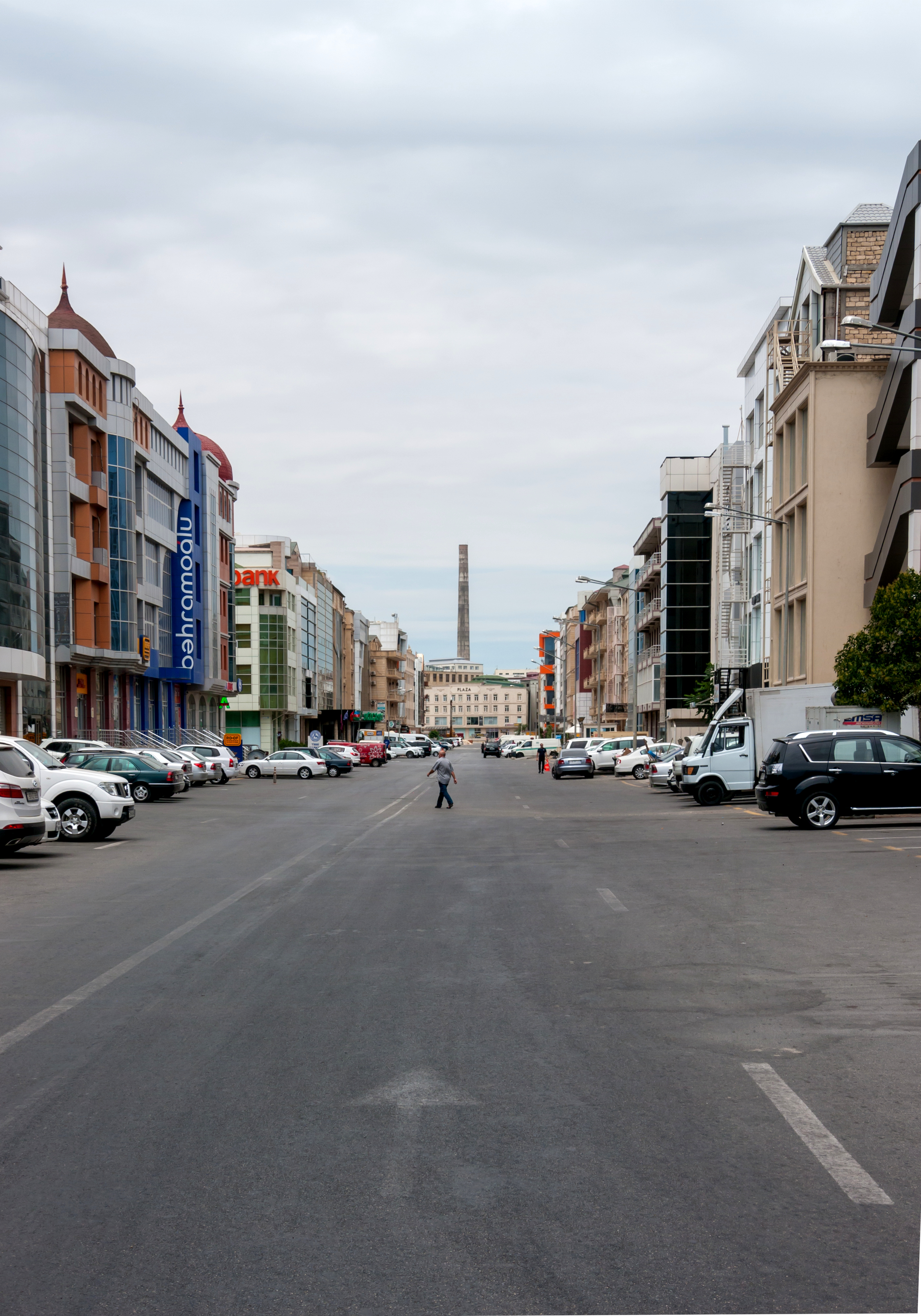
- Narimanov Business District

- Location within Azerbaijan
- Coordinates: 40°25′N 49°53′E
- Country: Azerbaijan
- City: Baku

Population (2010)
  - Total: 162,500
- Time zone: UTC+4 (AZT)
  - Summer (DST): UTC+4 (AZT)

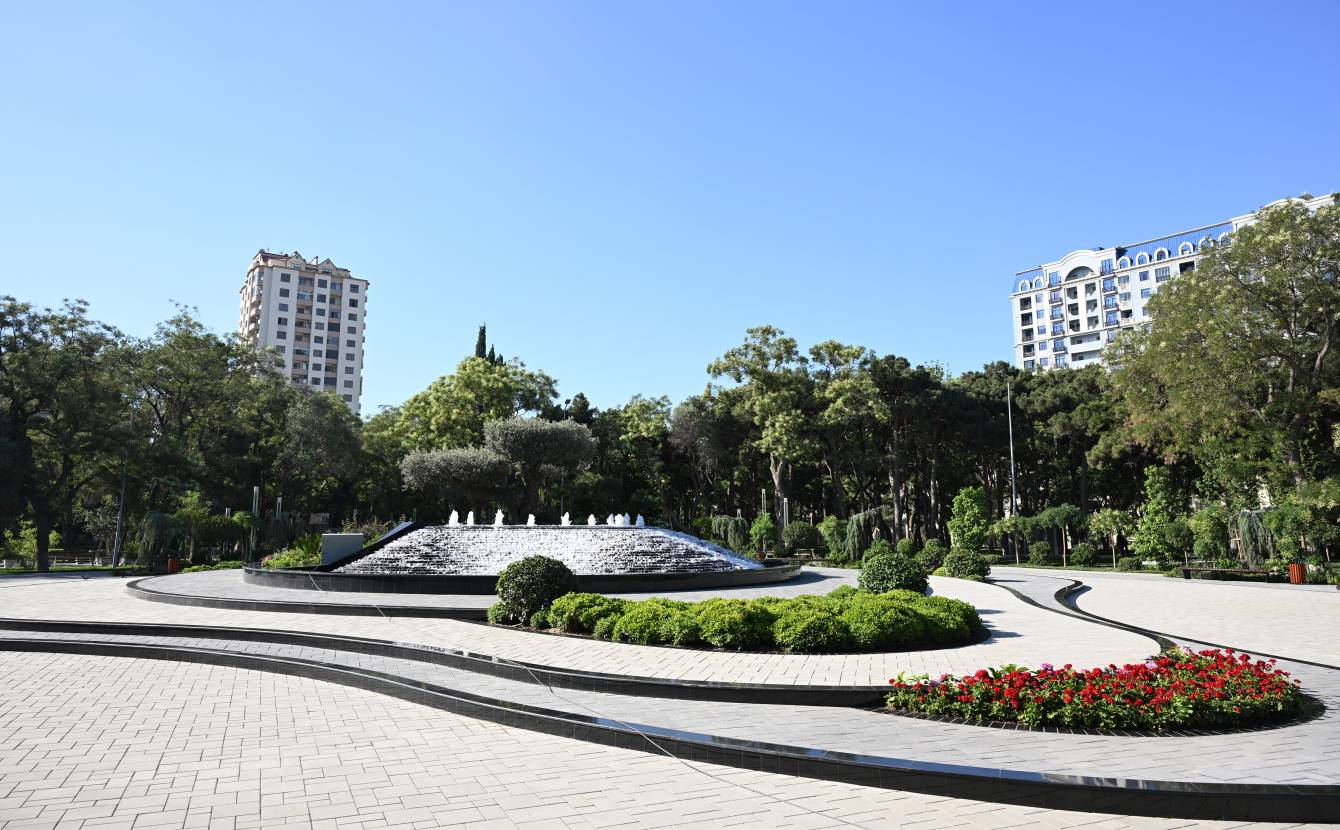
Public park in Narimanov raion

Nərimanov (also, Narimanov) is a settlement and raion in Baku, Azerbaijan. The administrative territory of the Narimanov district, one of the central districts of Baku, is 24.5 km^{2}, and its population is 170.300 in the official registration date of 01.01.2013.

The Narimanov district was founded in 1941. In January 1941, the Executive Committee of the Workers' Council of the Keshla region was established, and in August 1957, the name of Keshla was renamed, and it was renamed into the Executive Committee of the Narimanov District Council of Deputies. In December 1959, the Dzerzhinsky district was abolished, and its territory was included in Narimanov district in January 1960. From August 27, 1957, to October 6, 1977, the Executive Committee of the Soviet Union of Workers' Deputies of Narimanov district acted as the Executive Committee of the Narimanov District Council of People's Deputies from October 7, 1977, to October 17, 1991. In accordance with the Decree of the President of the Republic of Azerbaijan dated October 18, 1991, the Narimanov District Council of People's Deputies was abolished, and instead, the Narimanov District Executive Authority was established and functioned on 20 November 1991.

The district is urban, no villages and other administrative territorial units in Narimanov district.

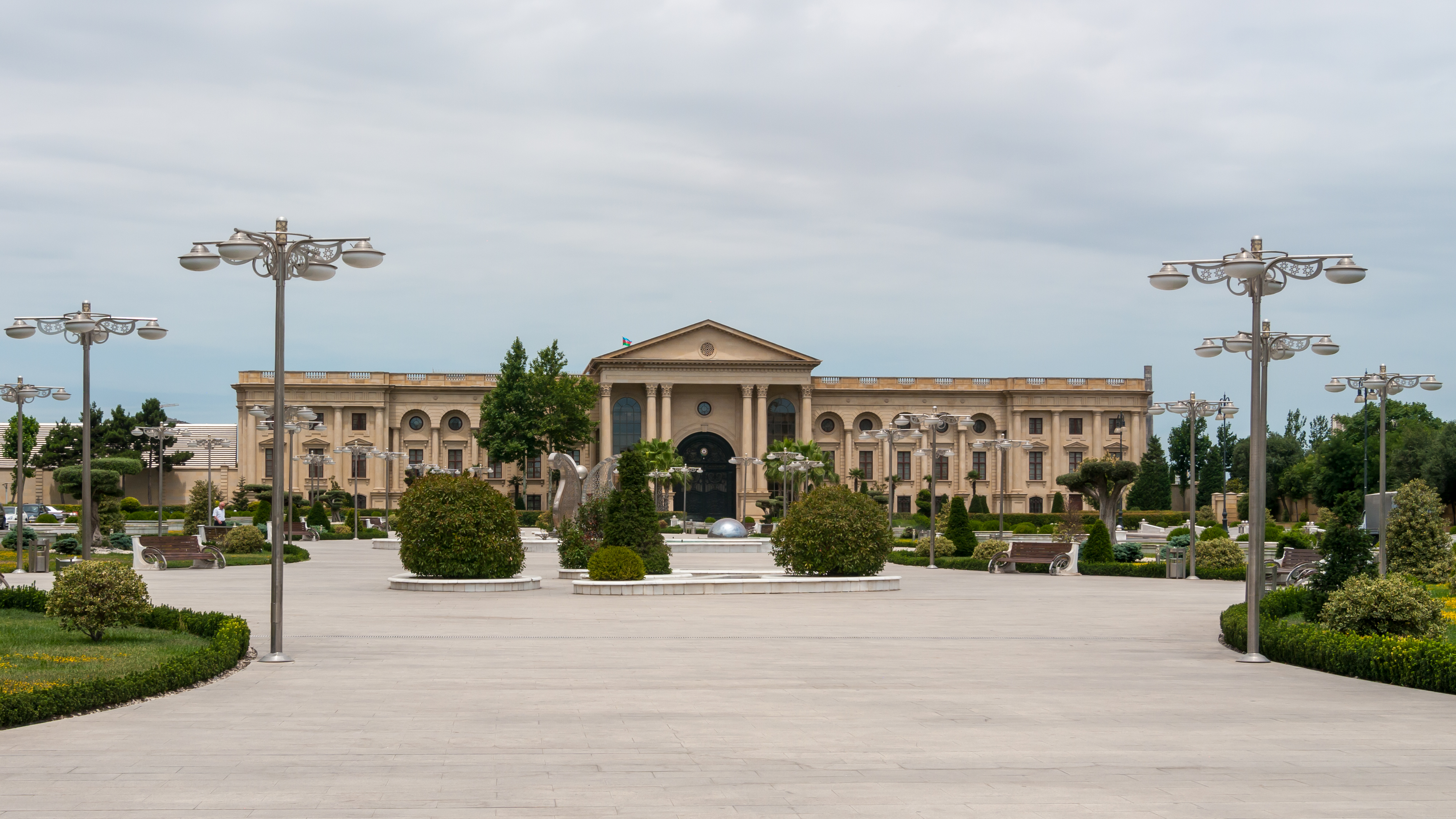
New Presidential Palace

The district is home to the Presidential Palace, as well as the Baku Convention Center and the Baku Zoo.

== Transport ==
Narimanov Metro station is located in this area.
