= 1995 Baku Metro fire =

Fatal fire accident in Baku, Azerbaijan

- One of the metro cars after the accident, with broken windows to make way for the escape

Details
- Date: 28 October 1995; 6:00 p.m. – ?
- Location: Baku Metro, Baku, Azerbaijan
- Coordinates: 40°24′47″N 49°53′17″E
- Incident type: Fire
- Cause: Electrical malfunction

Statistics
- Trains: 1
- Deaths: 289
- Injured: 270

On 28 October 1995, a fire broke out in the subway system of Baku, the capital of Azerbaijan, between the Ulduz and Nariman Narimanov stations. According to official figures, the fire killed 289 people: 286 passengers (including 28 children) and three rescue workers, while 270 people were injured. The fire was deemed to have been caused by an electrical malfunction, but the possibility of sabotage was not excluded.

Although a number of people who evacuated the train survived, the fire remains the world's deadliest subway disaster. One person, Chingiz Babayev, was posthumously awarded the title of the National Hero of Azerbaijan for saving passengers' lives.

== Background ==
The Ulduz and Nariman Narimanov metro stations serve the northern part of Azerbaijan's capital, Baku. The tunnel between them was equipped with a controllable ventilation system, but had a relatively narrow cross-section (height 5.6 metres (18 ft), width 5 metres (16 ft)).

Before 1995, the deadliest subway accident was the Malbone Street wreck of 1918 in New York City, which killed at least 93 people. The deadliest subway conflagration before 1995 was the Paris Métro train fire of 1903, which killed 84.

== Fire ==
The fire, caused by an electrical fault, occurred during the Saturday evening rush hour at about 6:00 p.m. The affected train, consisting of five fully loaded cars, had just left Ulduz station for Nariman Narimanov. The passengers in car number 5 smelled smoke. Later, passengers in car 4 observed white smoke, which soon turned black and caused irritation. The putative electrical malfunction (a sparkover or electric arc in electrical equipment in the rear of the fourth car) stopped the train about 200 meters from Ulduz station. When the train stopped, the tunnel became filled with smoke. The driver reported the incident and demanded that the power be cut. However, lethal emissions of carbon monoxide from the burning synthetic materials in the cars quickly affected the passengers. Because of difficulties opening the doors in one of the cars, the passengers were forced to evacuate through another car. Some 15 minutes after the fire started, the ventilation system was switched to exhaust mode and much of the smoke was drawn in the direction of evacuation. Several people were electrocuted while trying to grasp cables in order to escape the blazing train.

The majority of those killed (including 28 children) were found inside the train, most of them either crushed or trampled to death. Forty bodies were found inside the tunnel. Survivors recalled sparks flying from high-voltage cables just after the train left the Ulduz station. One of the passengers, Tabil Huseynov, 45, described the situation as follows: "As soon as the train entered the tunnel, I saw a flash. Then the flames enveloped the train car, there was a sound of breaking glass, and the lights went out. People started breaking windows to get out. We were starting to suffocate."

The estimated number of victims varied after the fire. Morgue officials reportedly counted at least 303 bodies, while the independent Azerbaijani news agency Turan quoted medical officials as saying the number of people killed was 337. A three-day mourning period was declared. Lukoil rendered $9,000 (or 18,000 dollars in 2024's money) in financial aid to the families of victims.

== Investigation ==
The government inquiry commission concluded that the fire was caused by an electrical fault. The fire started in the traction motor of one railway car. No explosives were found. The commission's chairman, Deputy Prime Minister Abbas Abbasov, mentioned "outdated Soviet" equipment. Yet two mysterious large holes on the side of one of the wrecked carriages were reportedly found and Azeri national TV quoted experts as saying the holes indicated the use of an explosive device. President Heydar Aliyev told a U.S. official that while preliminary information indicated a technical fault, the fire was "possibly an organised act of sabotage".

The Supreme Court of Azerbaijan convicted two persons for criminal negligence. The metro operator was sentenced to 15 years in prison and the station traffic controller 10 years.

== See also ==
- List of transportation fires
- 1994 Baku Metro bombings
- Daegu subway fire
