= Ali Antsukhskiy =

Azerbaijani politician (1947–1996)

Ali Antsukhskiy (1 June 1947 – 26 February 1996) was an Avar native of Balakan, member of National Assembly of Azerbaijan who claimed to be the leader of the Avar people. He was assassinated in the center of Baku in 1996.

== Milli Məclis ==
Antsukhskiy was elected to the National Assembly of Azerbaijan in 1995.

== Assassination ==
Antsukhskiy was assassinated in the center of Baku in 1996. The criminals were convicted and sentenced.
