= Igor Tõnurist =

Estonian folklorist (1947–2021)

Igor Tõnurist (11 February 1947 – 8 January 2021) was an Estonian ethnographer and folklorist.

In 1969 he graduated from Moscow University in history and ethnography.

Tõnurist was the leader of several folklore groups, including Leegajus and Seto folklore collective Sõsarõ. Among his research interests were Estonian national costume and Estonian folk instruments.

== Awards ==
- 2003: Order of the White Star, IV class.
