= Ganjlik (Baku Metro) =

Baku Metro Station

Ganjlik Gənclik
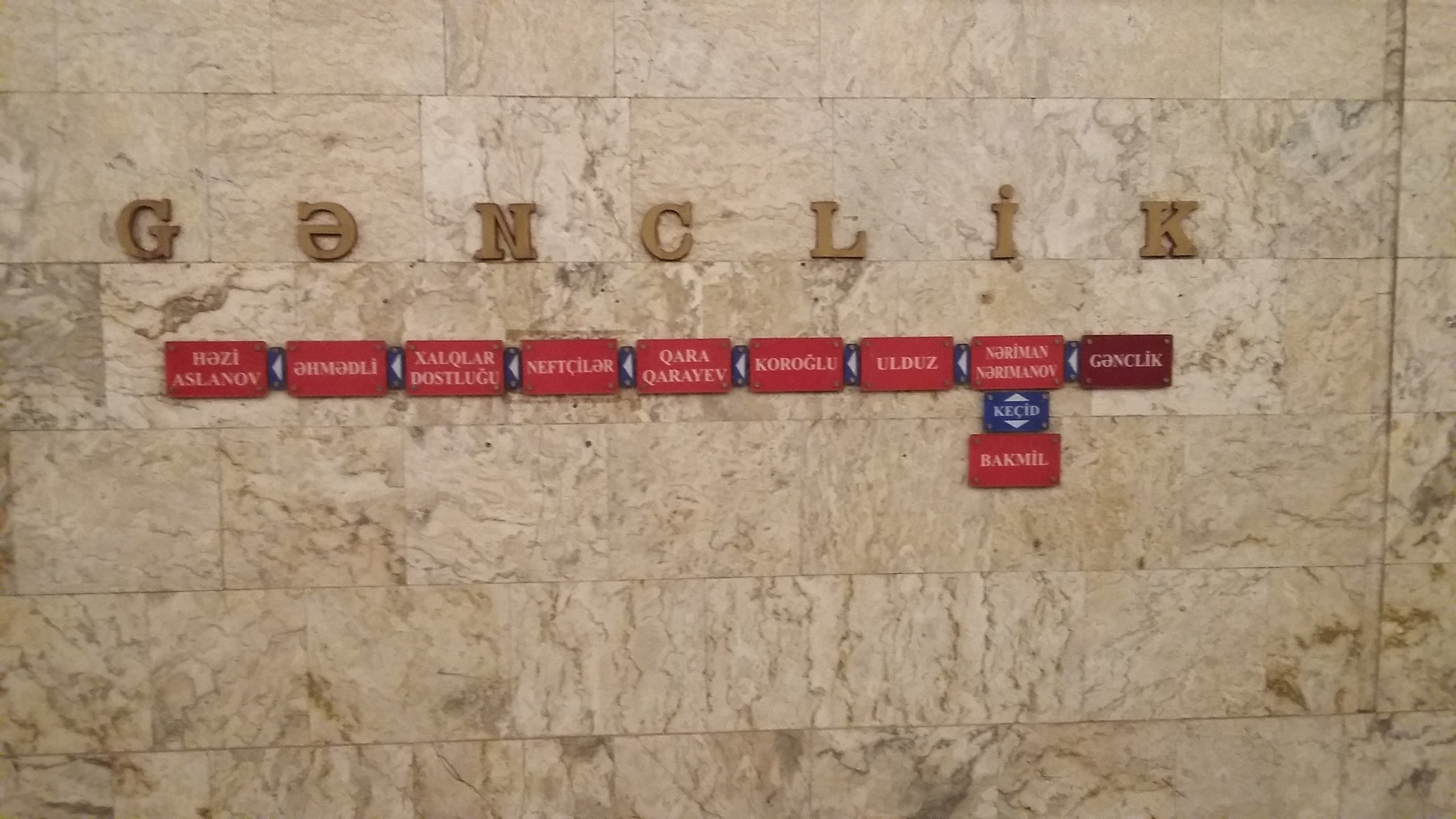
- Ganjlik metro station

General information
- Location: Baku, Azerbaijan
- Coordinates: 40.24°N 49.5108°E
- System: Baku Metro station
- Owner: Baku Metro
- Line: Red line
- Tracks: 2
- Connections: Bus station (future); Blue line Tram

History
- Opened: 6 November 1967

Services
Preceding station	Baku Metro	Following station
28 May towards Icheri Sheher	Red line	Nariman Narimanov towards Hazi Aslanov or Bakmil
28 May towards Darnagul	Green line	Nariman Narimanov towards Hazi Aslanov or Bakmil
Location

Ganjlik (Azerbaijani: Gənclik) is a Baku Metro station. It was opened on 6 November 1967. There is also a direct exit from the metro station to the shopping mall Ganjlik Mall and to Tofiq Bahramov Republican Stadium.

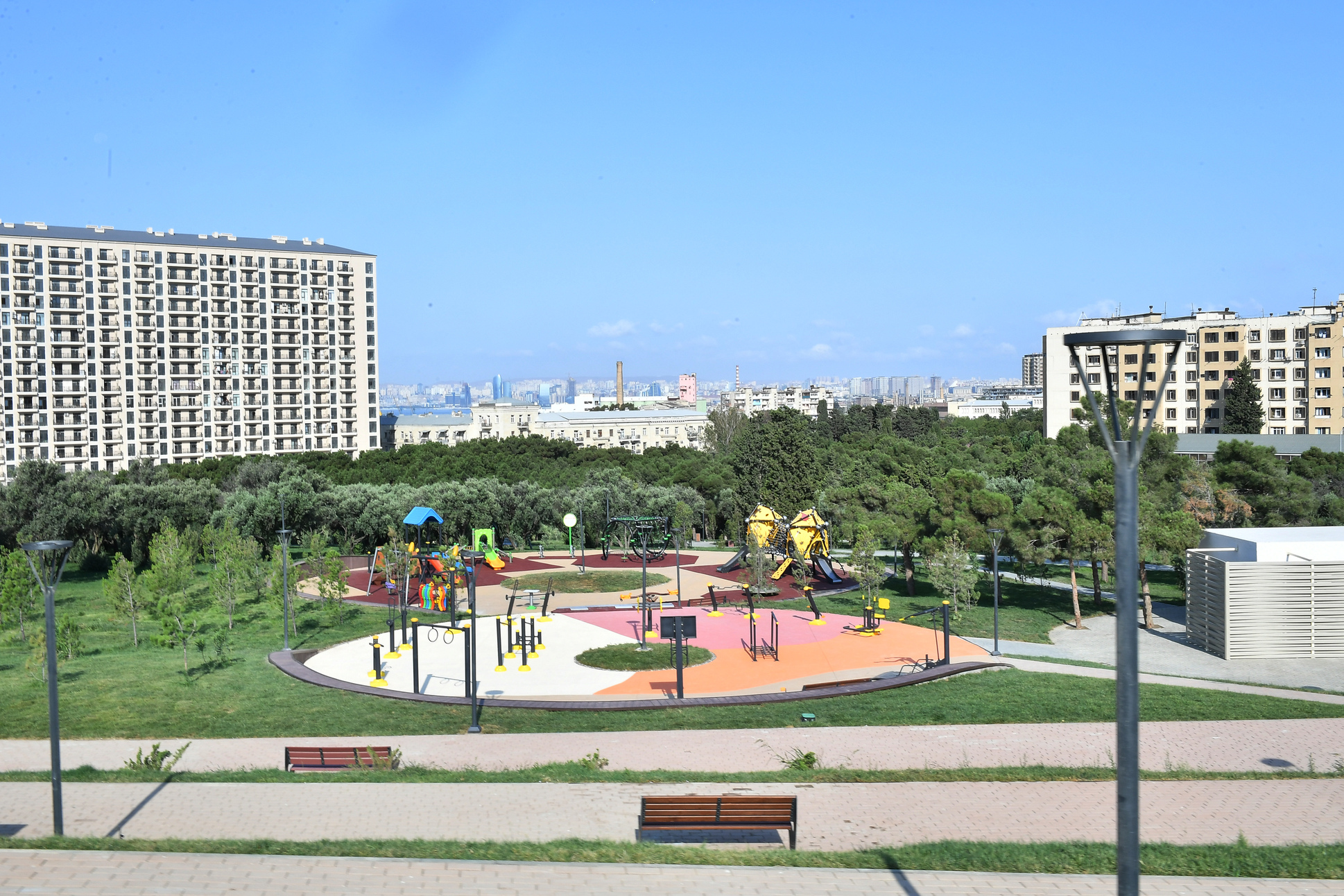
Ganjlik Park

== See also ==
- List of Baku metro stations
