= Ulduz (Baku Metro) =

Baku Metro Station

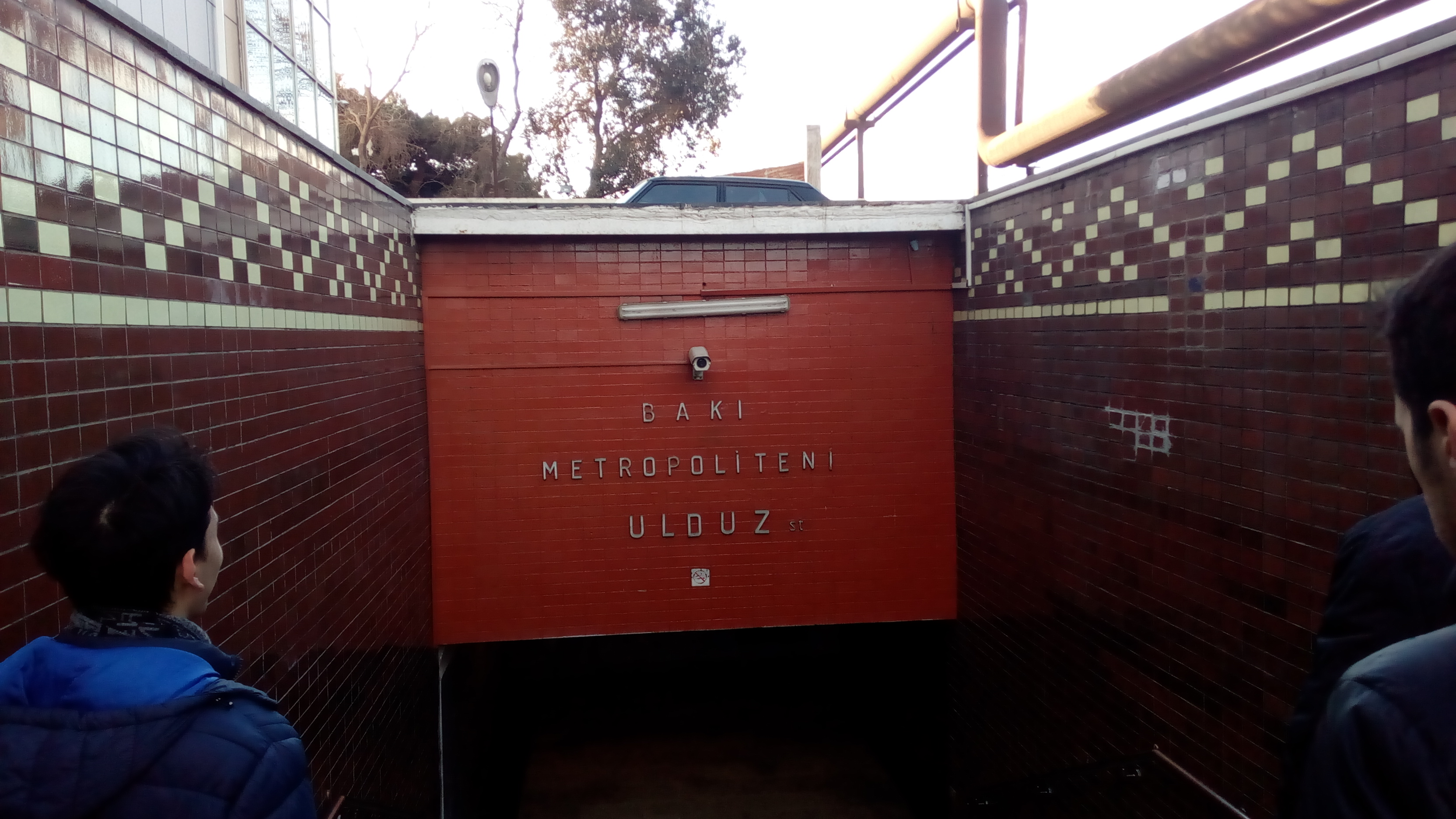

General information
- Location: Baku, Azerbaijan
- Coordinates: 40°24′53″N 49°53′32″E
- System: Baku Metro station
- Owner: Baku Metro
- Line: Red line
- Tracks: 2
- Connections: 36, 38, 145, 169, 184

History
- Opened: 5 May 1970

Services
Preceding station	Baku Metro	Following station
Nariman Narimanov towards Icheri Sheher	Red line	Koroğlu towards Hazi Aslanov
Nariman Narimanov towards Darnagul	Green line	Koroğlu towards Hazi Aslanov
Location

Ulduz is a subway station of Baku Metro that was opened on 17 April 1970. The length of the Red line of the Baku metro increased by 1.5 km with the commissioning of the "Ulduz" station.

On October 28, 1995, a fire broke out on a train moving from Baku metro station "Ulduz" to "Narimanov" station. This event is considered the biggest Baku subway accident in history.

The Ulduz Station near to the business district in the Keshla just in the North of Baku.

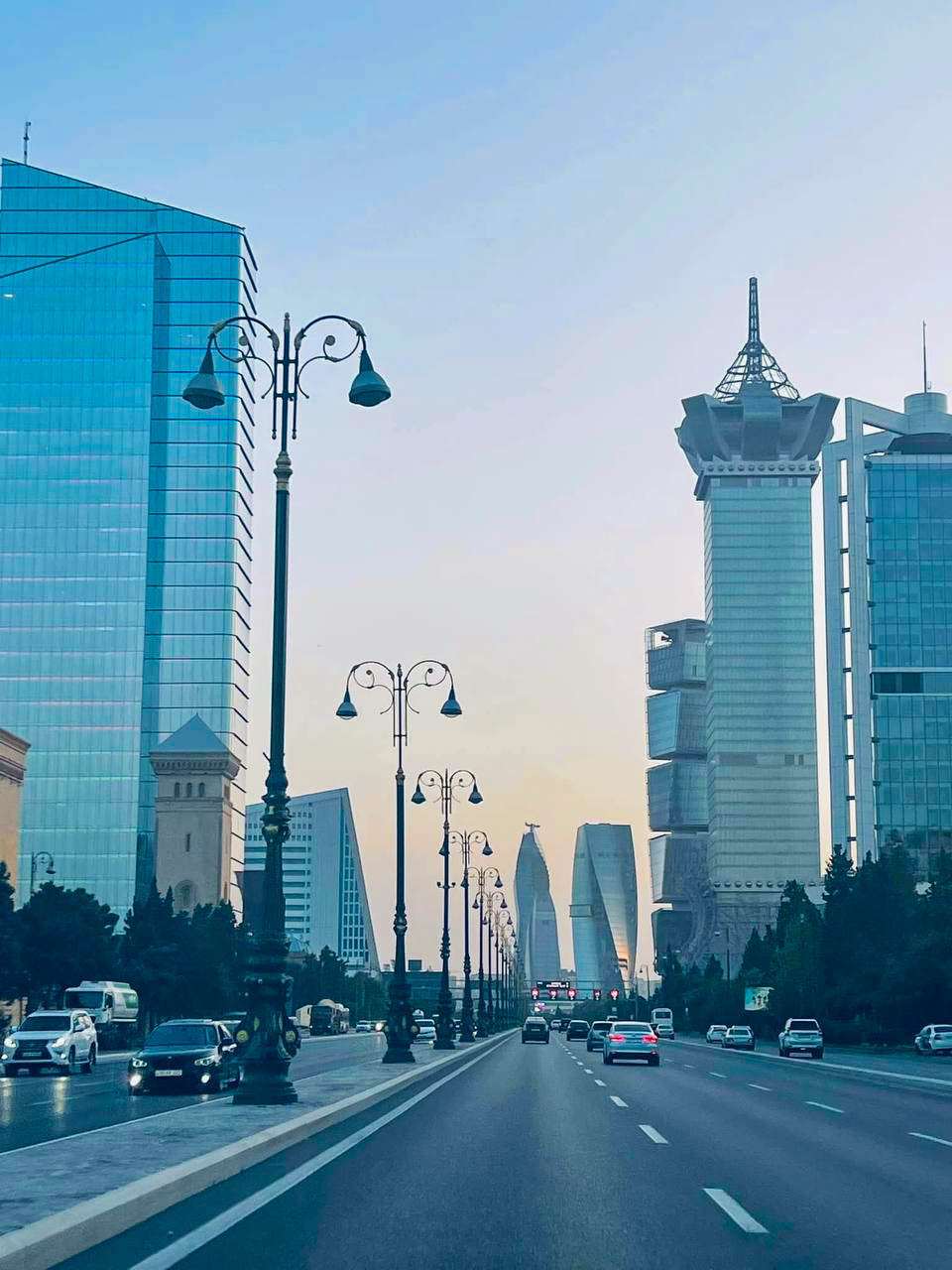
Keshla Business Area

== See also ==
- List of Baku metro stations
