= Nariman Narimanov (Baku Metro) =

Baku Metro Station

Nariman Narimanov Nəriman Nərimanov
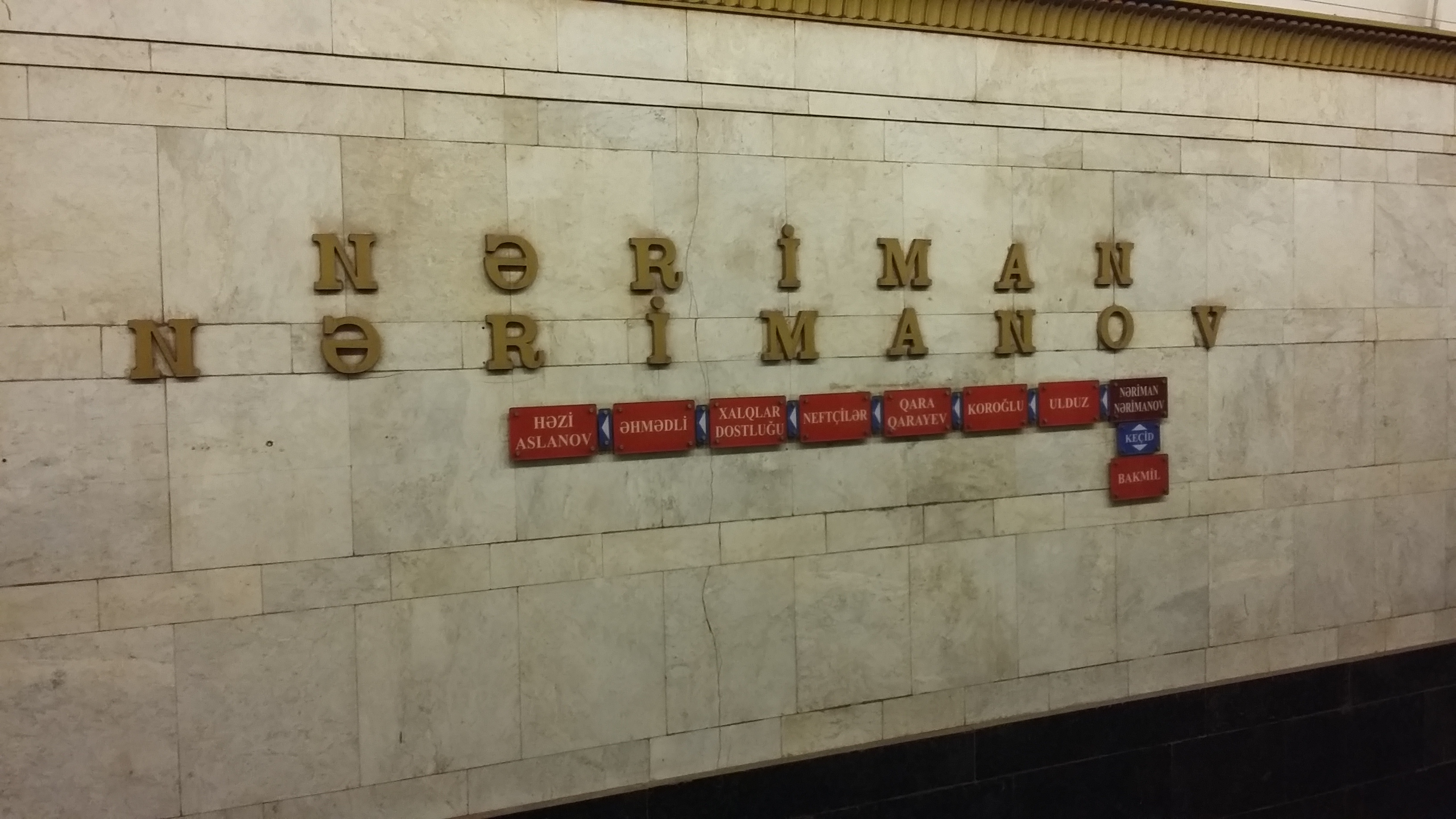

General information
- Location: Baku, Azerbaijan
- Coordinates: 40°24′10″N 49°52′14″E
- System: Baku Metro station
- Owner: Baku Metro
- Line: Red line
- Platforms: Island Platform
- Tracks: 2
- Connections: 2, 4, 5, 9, 11, 17, 24, 26, 38, 67, 202, M8 N. Narimanov railway station (Inactive)

History
- Opened: 6 November 1967

Services
| Preceding station | Baku Metro | Following station |
|---|---|---|
| Ganjlik towards Icheri Sheher | Red line | Bakmil Terminus |
| Ganjlik towards Icheri Sheher | Red line | Ulduz towards Hazi Aslanov |
| Ganjlik towards Darnagul | Green line | Ulduz towards Hazi Aslanov |
| Ganjlik towards Darnagul | Green line | Bakmil Terminus |
Location

Nariman Narimanov (Azerbaijani: Nəriman Nərimanov) is a Baku Metro station. It was opened on 6 November 1967 and is named after Nariman Narimanov. The 1995 Baku Metro Fire took place near this station.

== See also ==
- List of Baku metro stations
- Nariman Narimanov
