= Lezgins in Azerbaijan =

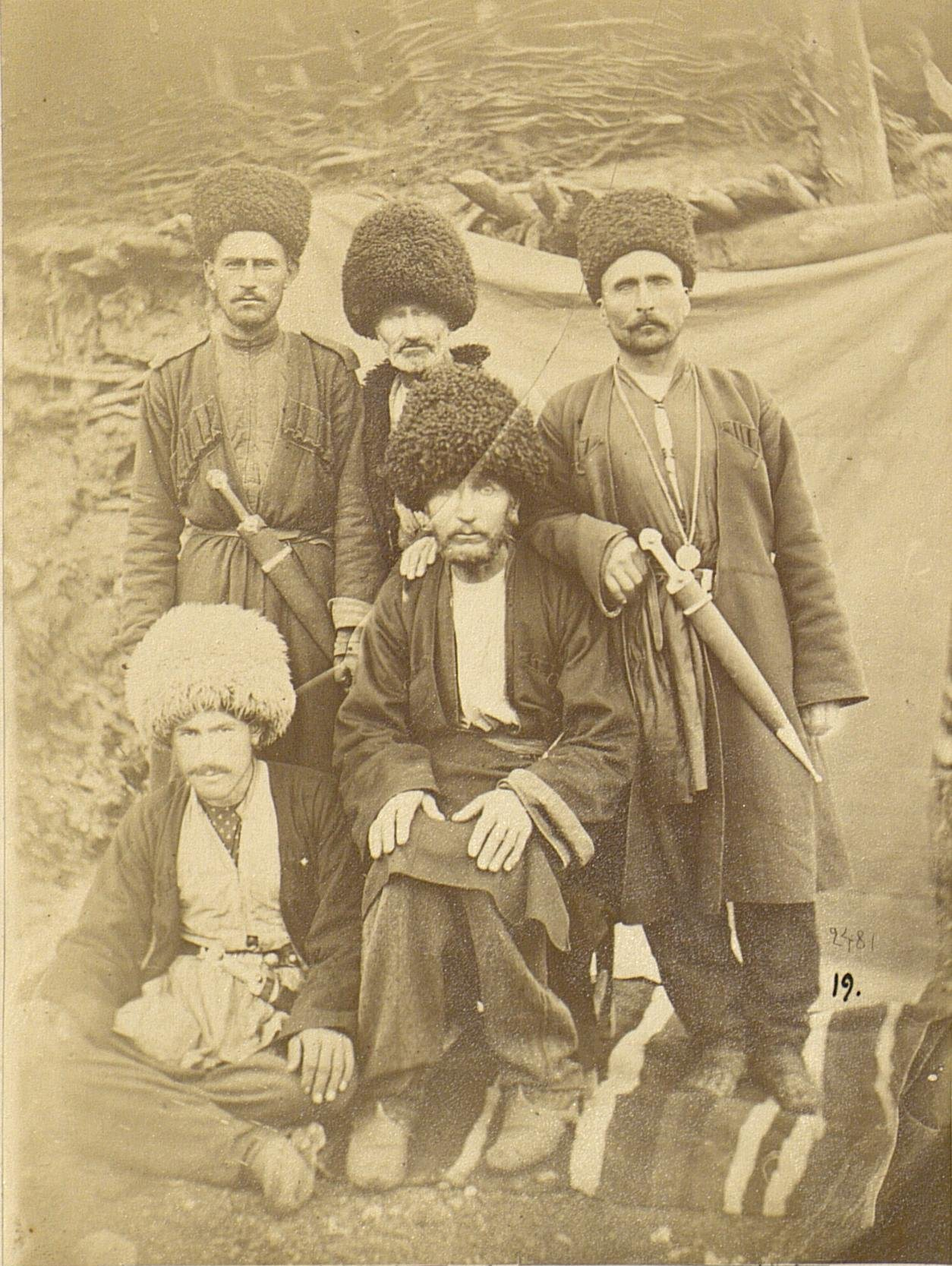
- Lezgins from the village of Laza (now Qusar District), 1880

Total population
- 250,000 (1921 census)

Languages
- Lezgin, Azerbaijani, Russian

Religion
- Sunni Islam

Lezgins (Lezgian: Азербайжанда авай лезгияр) are the largest ethnic minority in Azerbaijan historically living in some northern regions of Azerbaijan. For most Lezgins, the mother tongue is Lezgin, and minorities have Azerbaijani and Russian as the mother language.

== History ==
The appearance of many Lezgian villages in Azerbaijan is associated with the relocation of part of the Dagestan Lezgins to the south its territory.

At the beginning of the 18th century, a movement was launched among the ethnic groups of this part of the Caucasus against Persian rule in the region. During the first Russo-Persian war in 1806, the Quba Khanate became part of the Russian Empire.

== Settlement ==
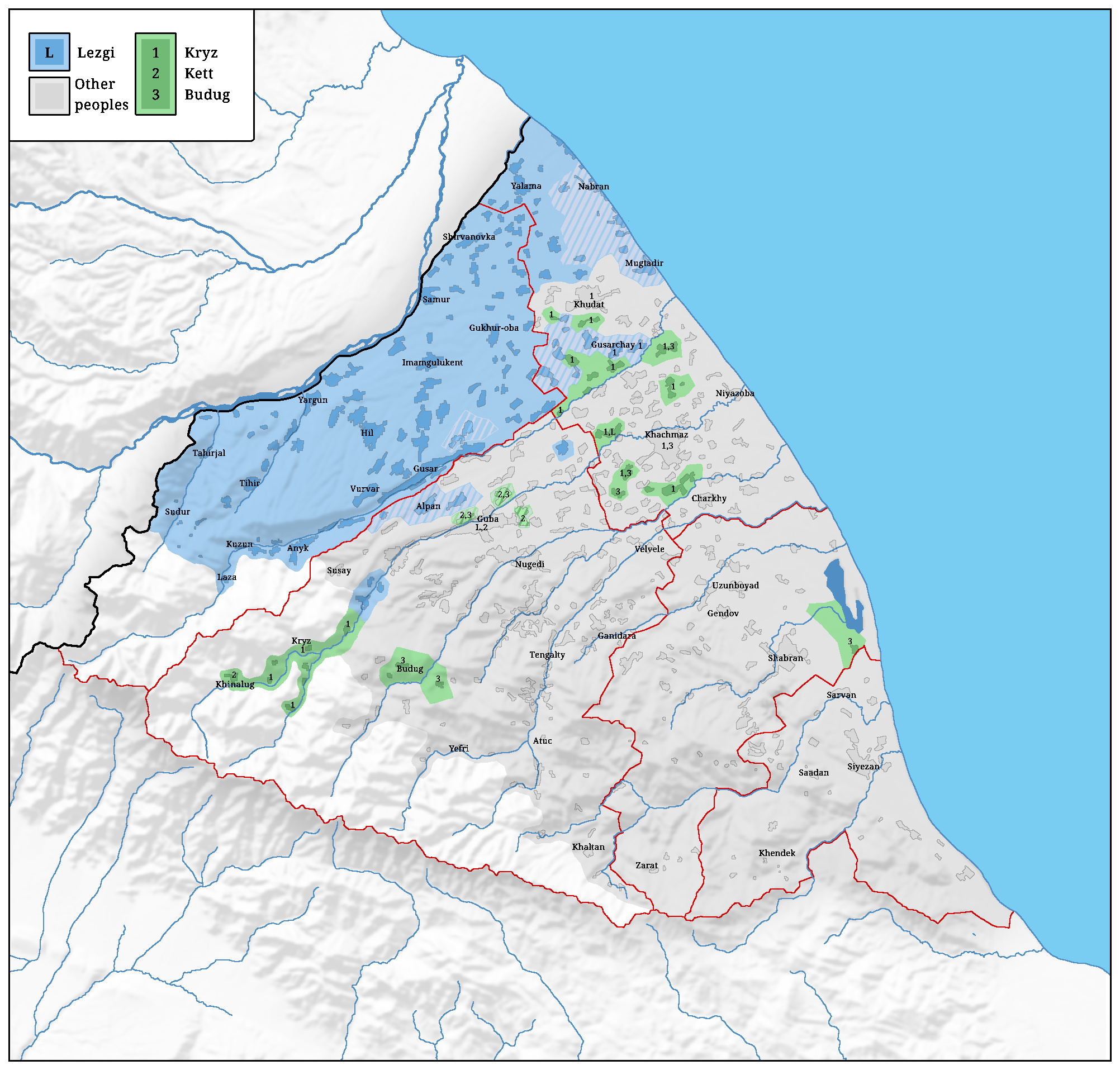
Lezgin settlements in the Guba-Khachmaz Region

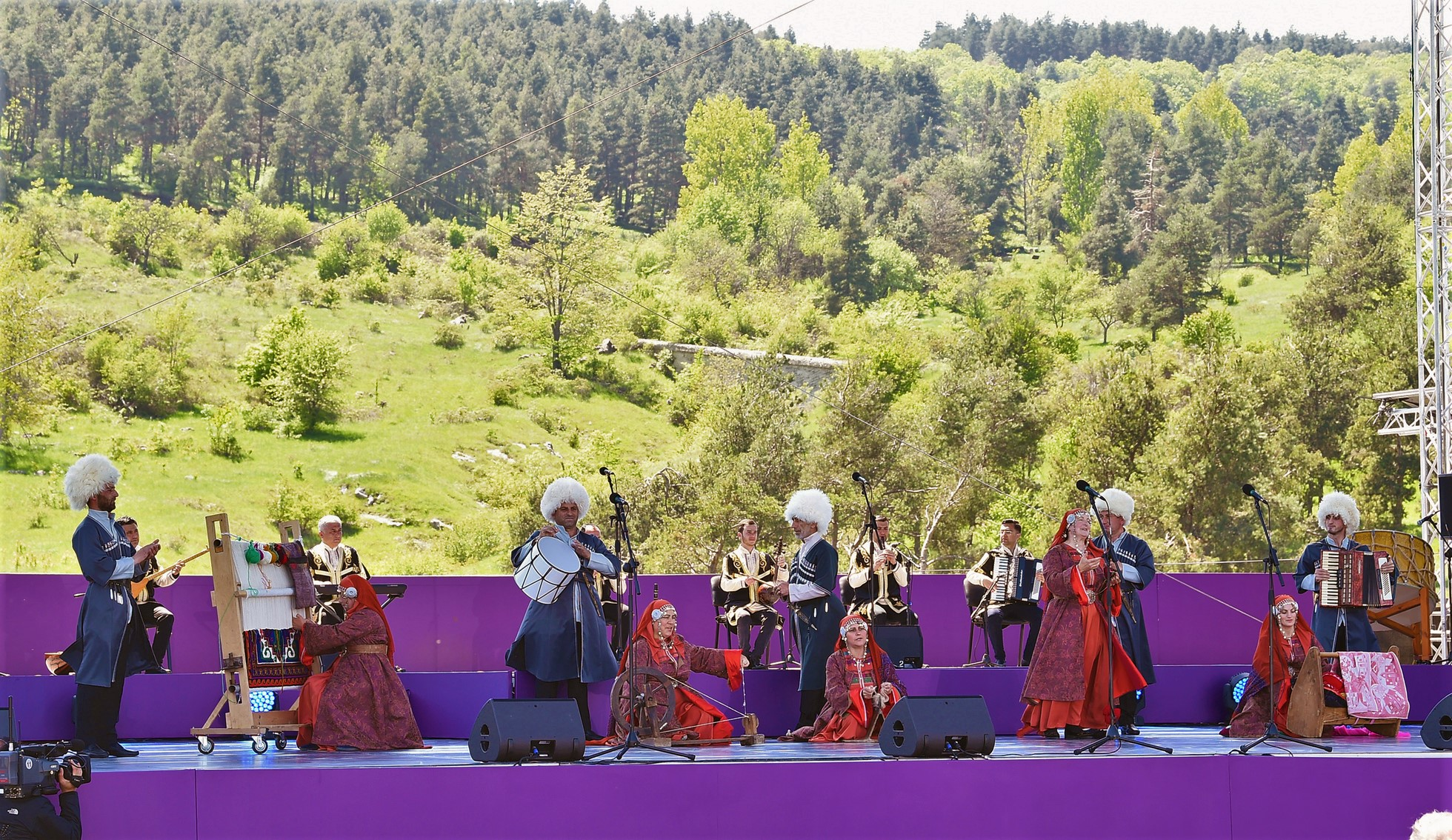
Lazgi music group performing Perizade. Khari Bulbul Music Festival

The territory of compact settlement of Lezgin occupies Qusar District, parts of Quba District and Khachmaz District. Several Lezgi settlements are located behind the Main Caucasian Range in Qabala District, Ismailli District, Oghuz District and Shaki District. There are also mixed settlements where Lezgins live with representatives of other nations. The Lezgin population is represented in large cities such as Baku and Sumqayit. According to the 2009 census, Baku itself ranks second among the country's regions in terms of the number of Lezghins living here.

== Quotes ==
According to the Center for International Development and Conflict Management at the University of Maryland:

Although many feared that Lezgin demands for the creation of an independent "Lezgistan" would result in another secessionist war in Azerbaijan, these fears have thus far proved to be unwarranted. It currently appears less likely than ever that the Lezgins will resort to any sustained collective action to address their grievances, although isolated incidents do occur. In the past eight years, they have not engaged in any serious protests and only two incidents of violence; they have also shown a willingness to negotiate and compromise on their most intractable demands. The Lezgin nationalist movements do not receive wide support among the Lezgin people who are not well-organized at the grass-roots level

According to Thomas de Waal:

Although there are no discriminatory policies against them on the personal level, the Lezghins* campaign for national-cultural autonomy is vehemently rejected by the Azerbaijani authorities. Daghestani Lezghins fear that the continued existence of their ethnic kin in Azerbaijan as a distinct community is threatened by what they consider Turkic nationalistic policies of forceful assimilation. Inter-ethnic tensions between Lezghins and Azeris spilled over from Azerbaijan to Daghestan also. They started in 1992 when the Popular Front came to power in Azerbaijan, but reached a peak in mid-1994, the time of heavy losses on the Karabakh front. In May that year violent clashes occurred in Derbent (Daghestan), and in June in the Gussary region of Azerbaijan. Since then the situation has stabilised, although Azerbaijani authorities allege a link between Lezghin activists and Karabakh Armenians and a cloud of suspicion surrounds the Lezghin community in Azerbaijan.
