= 1994 Baku Metro bombings =

Series of terrorist incidents in 1994, in Baku

- Location: Baku, Azerbaijan
- Date: 19 March and 3 July 1994
- Target: Baku Metro
- Attack type: Terrorist incidents
- Deaths: 27 (in total)
- Injuries: 91 (in total)
- Perpetrators: 2 (in total)

The 1994 Baku Metro bombings was a series of terrorist incidents that targeted the Baku Metro in Baku, Azerbaijan. The first attack was perpetrated at the 20 Yanvar metro station, while the second one took place between the 28 May and Ganjlik stations. As a result of the first attack, 14 people were killed and 49 wounded. The second attack resulted in 13 people killed and 42 injured.

Eleven indirect perpetrators of the first attack were charged: two have been sentenced to life imprisonment and nine others to 15 years. The lone perpetrator of the second attack was also sentenced to life imprisonment.

== The bombings ==
The first attack, a suicide bombing, occurred on 19 March at the 20 Yanvar metro station at 13:00 local time. The time bomb planted under a seat in the head railroad car detonated when it stopped at the station, killing the immediate perpetrator Oktay Gurbanov. The lead railroad car was destroyed and the station's roof partially collapsed. Among the victims was Azeri jazzman Rafig Babayev, whose workplace was near the station. The work of Baku Metro was temporarily suspended afterwards.

The second attack was perpetrated on 3 July. The bomb (a remote controlled gelatine explosive, according to Azeri intelligence authorities) detonated at 8:30 a.m. local time when the train, having departed from the 28 May station, was 500 m away from the Ganjlik railway platform. The majority of persons injured in that attack has been promptly released after medical assistance.

== Investigation ==
Following the attacks, President Heydar Aliyev signed a decree on formation of the State Investigation Commission. During the investigation, Armenian intelligence officers, accused of involvement in the series of metro bombings in Baku as well as on Azerbaijani trains operating both in Azerbaijan and Russia, were taken into custody in Moscow. The Russian citizens Kamo Fyodorovich Saakov, an ethnic Armenian, his wife Irina Alexandrovna Saakova and Anatoly Anatolyevich Ilchuk were arrested in July 1994, charged with preparations of the attacks. In August of the same year Saakov was sentenced to life imprisonment and Ilchuk to 15-year imprisonment for preparation of diversion, contraband and illegal custody of weaponry. The investigation ended in early October 1995.

On 29 November 1997, the Russian law enforcement bodies extradited to Azerbaijan the 30-year-old Lezghin Azer Aslanov, who was charged with planting a bomb in the second attack. According to Azerbaijani Prosecutor General's Office, Aslanov was taken prisoner by Armenian military in January 1994 while serving in the Azerbaijani army and was commissioned by the Armenian security service to plant the bomb in Baku.

According to the former senior investigator and counterintelligence officer of the Ministry of Security of Azerbaijan, Lieutenant Colonel Ramin Nagiyev (Azerbaijani: Ramin Nağıyev) (Russian: Рамин Нагиев), who had served in the Ryazan military prosecutor's office during the Soviet Union and who investigated high-profile crimes in Azerbaijan including the 1994 Baku bombings and sent 180 terrorism cases to court by 1999, the 1994 Baku Metro bombings, the 1999 Ryazan apartment bombings, the 1999 Moscow bombings, and other terrorist actions were very similar and allegedly these events received support from the FSK and later the FSB. The Russian citizen of ethnic Azerbaijani origin, Nariman Ramazanov (Russian: Нариман Рамазанов), who was believed to be the mastermind of the bombing, was detained by Azerbaijani security services in June 1996, but was released back to Russia during a prisoner exchange shortly afterwards upon orders from the highest levels of the government of Azerbaijan. Nagiyev believed that high ranking Azerbaijani officials, such as Heydar Aliyev or Ilham Aliyev, had been compromised by the Kremlin. (Note: In the late 1990s, Ramin Nagiyev left Azerbaijan via Russia for Paris and received political asylum in France.) Both Alexander Litvinenko and Yuri Felshtinsky supported Nagiyev's allegations, too, and detailed their allegations in the book Blowing Up Russia which was banned in Russia.

== See also ==
- 1990 Tbilisi-Agdam bus bombing
- 1995 Baku Metro fire
- 1991 Azerbaijani Mil Mi-8 shootdown
