= Jafar Jabbarly (Baku Metro) =

Baku Metro Station

Coordinates: 40°22′46″N 49°50′56″E

Jafar Jabbarly Cəfər Cabbarlı
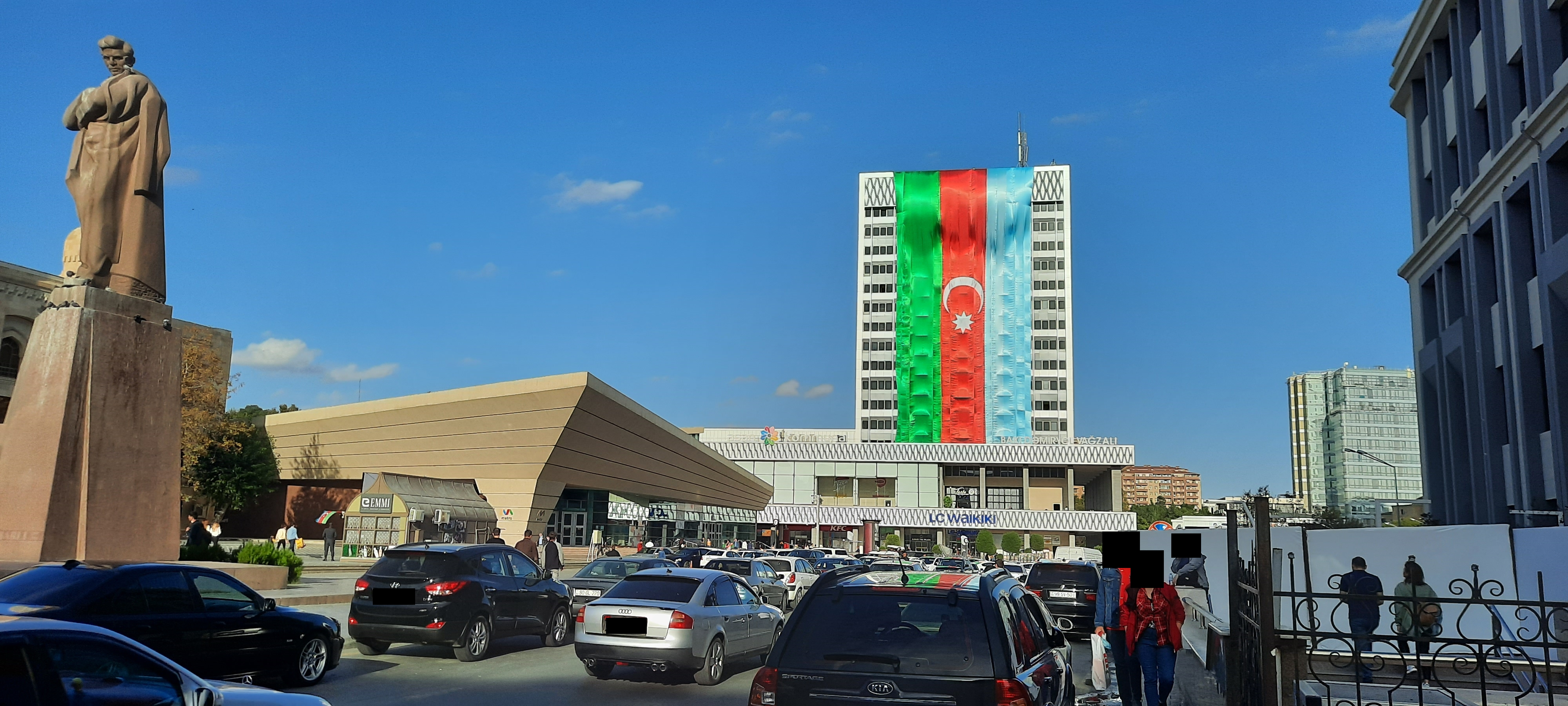
- Monument of J.Jabbarli

General information
- Location: Baku, Azerbaijan
- System: Baku Metro station
- Owner: Baku Metro
- Line: Green line
- Tracks: 2
- Connections: 28 May Red line Bus station Airport bus Bike lane Baku railway station (Future) Tram

History
- Opened: 27 October 1993

Services
Preceding station	Baku Metro	Following station
Terminus	Green line (separated part)	Shah Ismail Khatai Terminus
Sahil towards Icheri Sheher	Red line transfer at 28 May	Ganjlik towards Hazi Aslanov or Bakmil
Nizami Ganjavi towards Darnagul	Green line transfer at 28 May	Ganjlik towards Hazi Aslanov or Bakmil
Location

Jafar Jabbarly (Azerbaijani: Cəfər Cabbarlı) is a Baku Metro station. It opened on 27 October 1993. It is named after Jafar Jabbarly nearby public square. This station is located in the city Transport HUB.

== Connections ==
Connections from

Green line

to

Red line

to 28 May (Baku Metro) and Baku railway station.

=== Aero Express Bus ===
BakuBus H1 buses run 24 hours a day from this Metro Station to Baku Airport.

== See also ==
- List of Baku metro stations
- Jafar Jabbarly
