= 28 May (Baku Metro) =

Baku Metro station

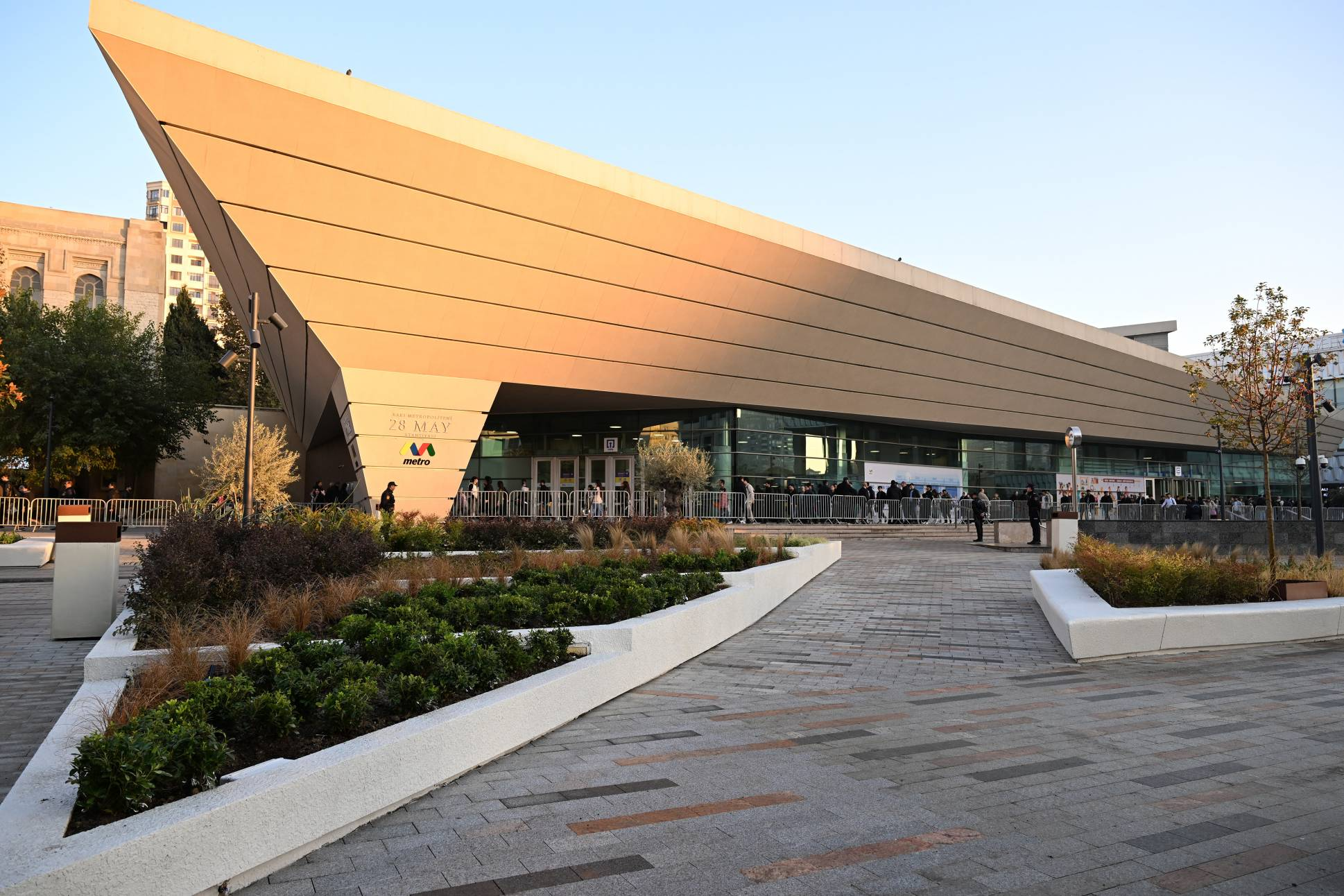
- 28 May metro station

General information
- Location: Baku, Azerbaijan
- Coordinates: 40.22°N 49.5056°E
- System: Baku Metro station
- Owner: Baku Metro
- Line: Red line
- Tracks: 2
- Connections: Jafar Jabbarli Green line Bus station Airport bus Baku railway station (Future) Tram

Construction
- Cycle facilities: Bike lane

History
- Opened: 6 November 1967

Services
Preceding station	Baku Metro	Following station
Sahil towards Icheri Sheher	Red line	Ganjlik towards Hazi Aslanov or Bakmil
Nizami Ganjavi towards Darnagul	Green line	Ganjlik towards Hazi Aslanov or Bakmil
Terminus	Green line (separated part) transfer at Jafar Jabbarly	Shah Ismail Khatai Terminus
Location

28 May is a Baku Metro station. It was opened on 6 November 1967. It was formerly called 28 April. It is connected to the adjacent Baku Central Railway Station by a pedestrian tunnel. It is also nearby 28 May Shopping Mall. This station is located in the city Transport HUB. There is nearby Landmark Hotel Baku.

== Connections ==
Connections from

Red line

to Jafar Jabbarly (Baku Metro), at the

Green line

and also to Baku railway station.

=== Aerobus ===
BakuBus H1 buses run 24 hours a day from 28 May Metro Station to Baku Airport.

== Gallery ==
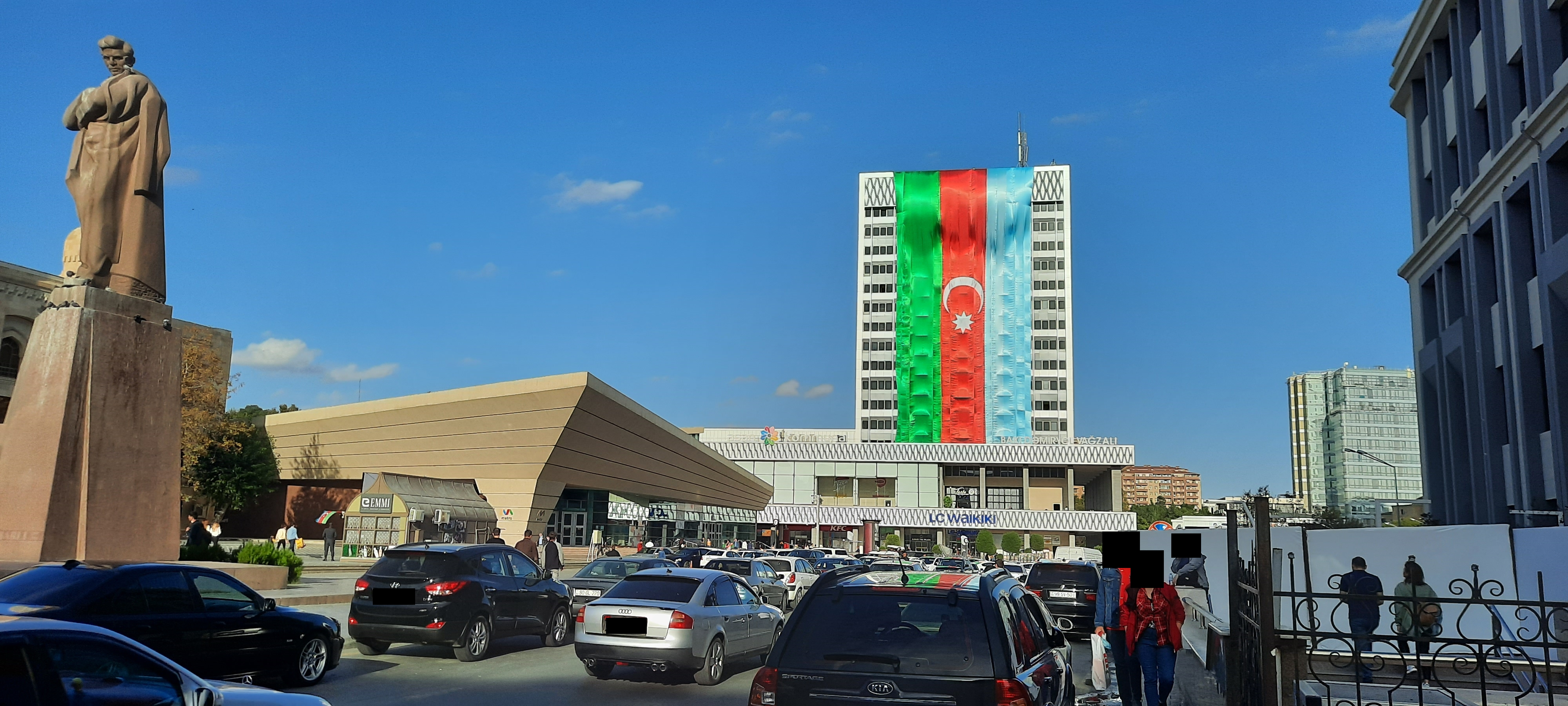
Panoramic view of 28 May, Jafar Jabbarli subway stations and Baku Central Railway Station.

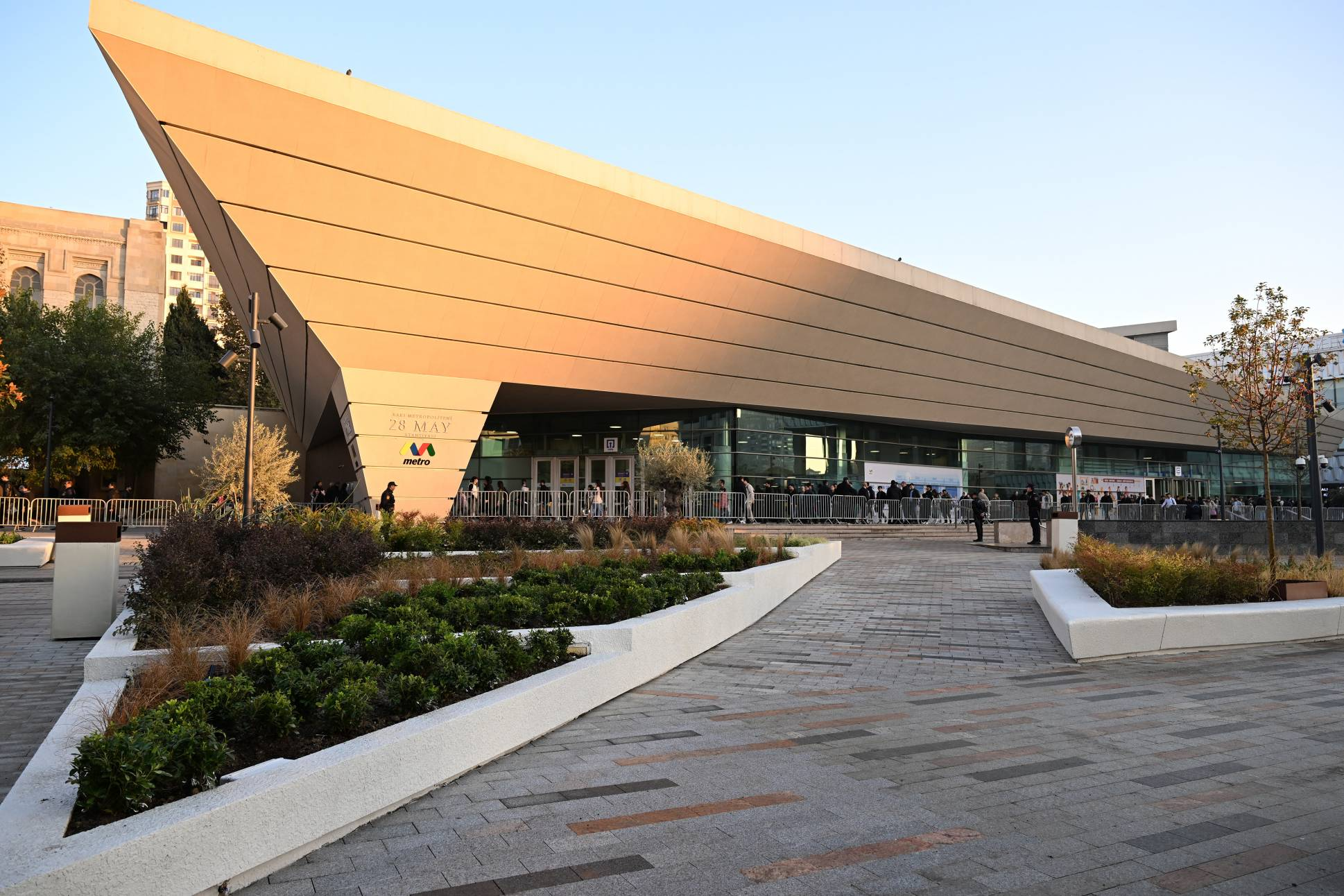
28May Metro Station

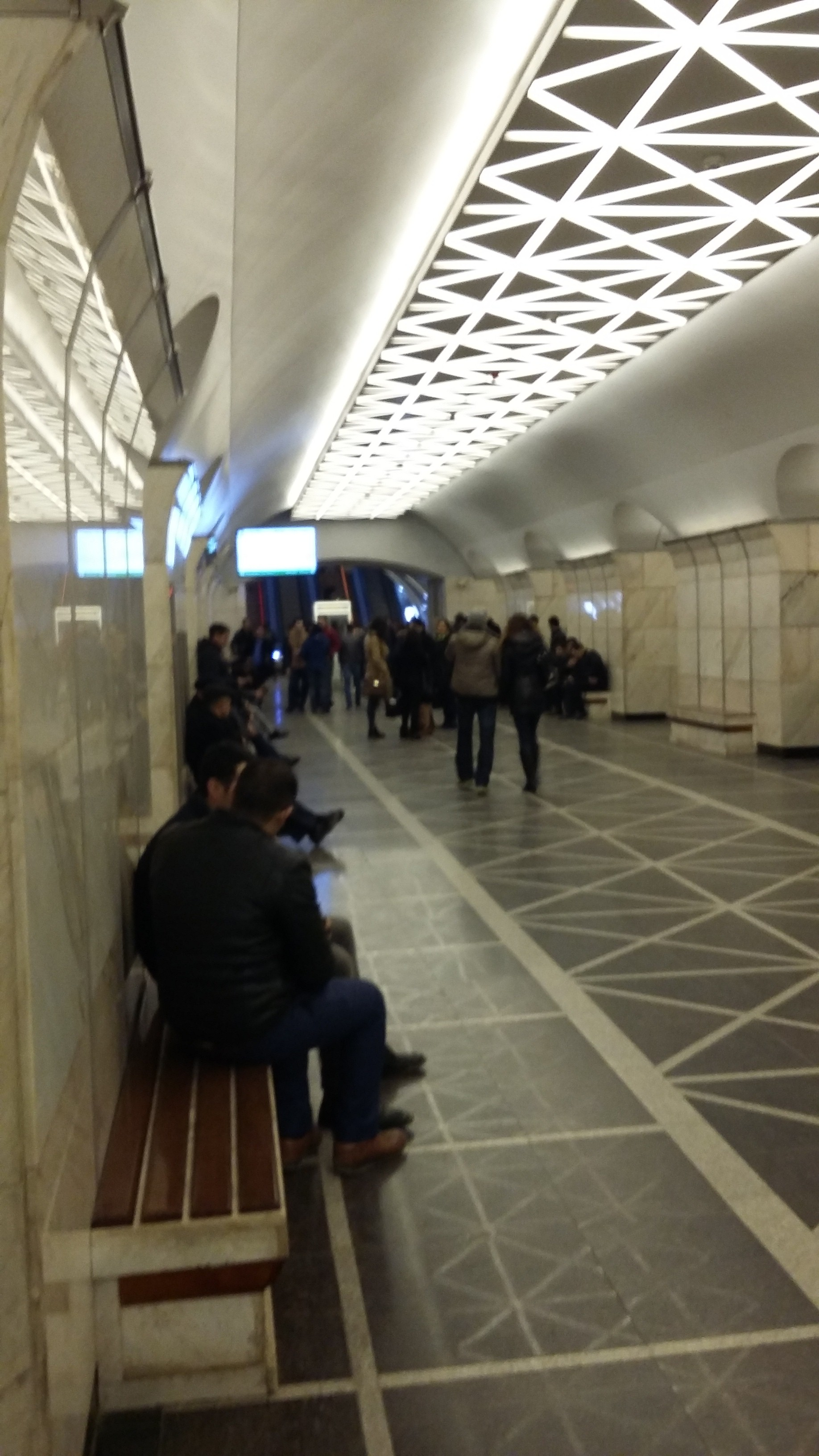
Interior

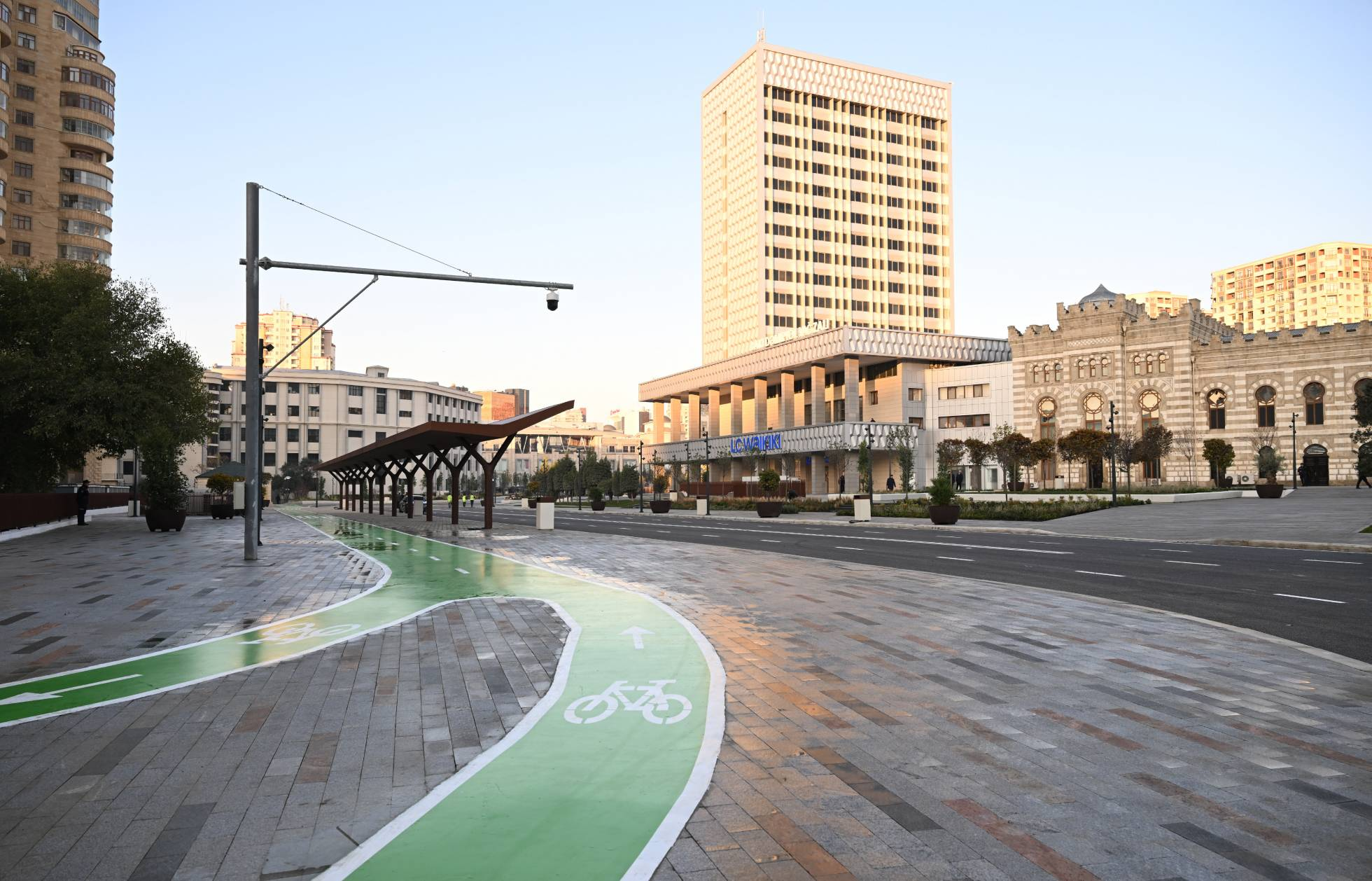
Bike Lanes

== See also ==
- List of Baku metro stations
- Independence Day (Azerbaijan, 28 May)
