= Memar Ajami (Baku Metro) =

Baku Metro Station

Memar Ajami Memar Əcəmi
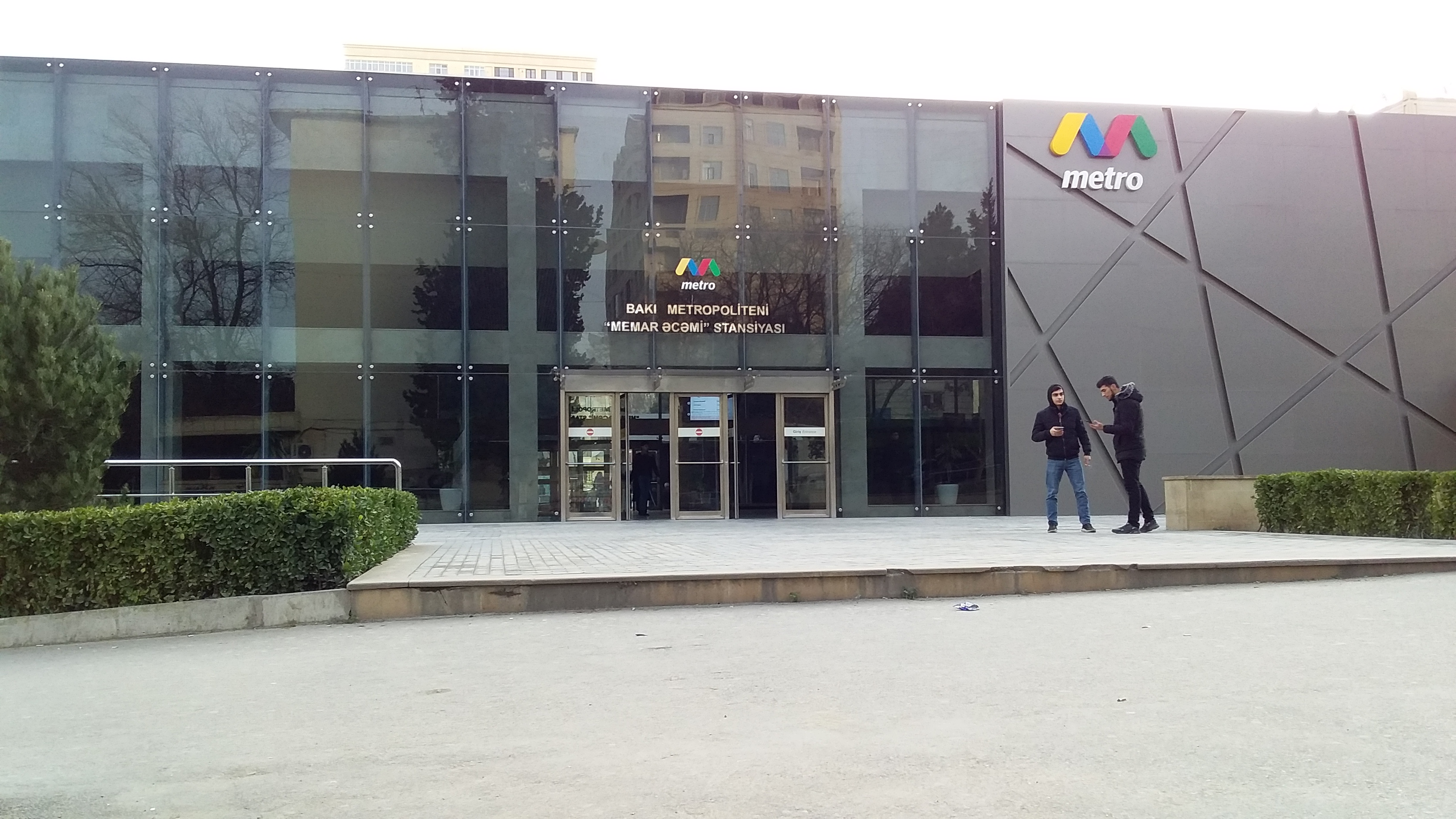

General information
- Location: Baku, Azerbaijan
- Coordinates: 40.24°N 49.4856°E
- System: Baku Metro station
- Owner: Baku Metro
- Line: Green line
- Tracks: 4 (2 per line)
- Connections: Purple line 9, 52, 79, 85, 92, 119, 135, 156, 165, 170, 205, 525

Construction
- Accessible: Disabled access

History
- Opened: 31 December 1985 (Green Line); 19 April 2016 (Purple Line)

Services
Preceding station	Baku Metro	Following station
Nəsimi towards Darnagul	Green line	20 Yanvar towards Hazi Aslanov or Bakmil
Avtovağzal towards Khojasan	Purple line	8 Noyabr Terminus
Location

Memar Ajami (Azerbaijani: Memar Əcəmi) is a Baku Metro station. It was opened on 31 December 1985. It was formerly called Mikrorayon and is named after Ajami Nakhchivani. It became a transfer station to the Purple Line on 19 April 2016.

== Connections ==
Connection from

Green line

to

Purple line

.

== Gallery ==
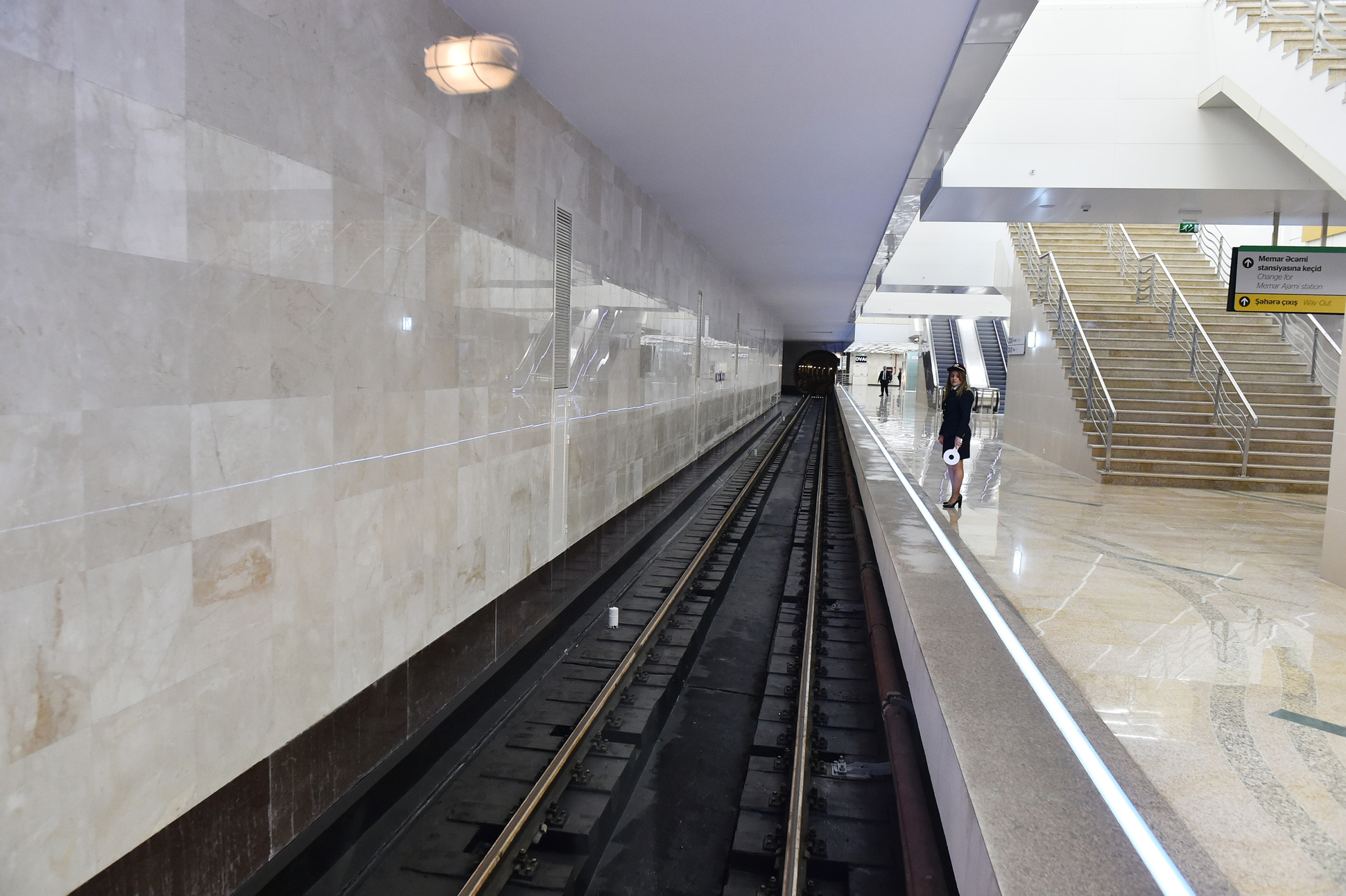
Memar Ajami-2

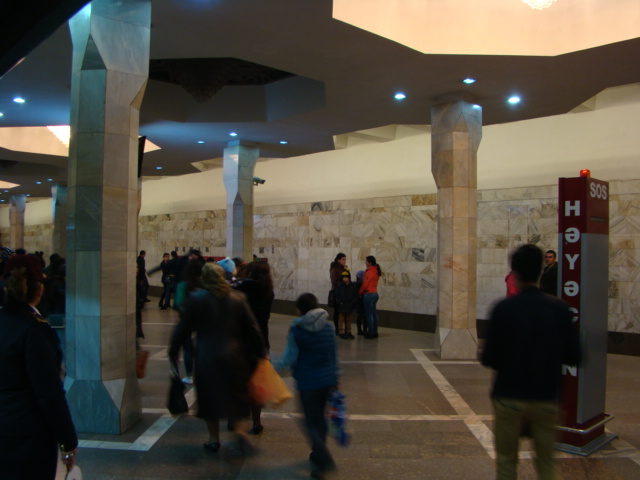
Memar Ajami-1

== See also ==
- List of Baku metro stations
- Memar Ajami
