= Azadliq prospekti (Baku Metro) =

Baku Metro Station

Azadlıq prospekti
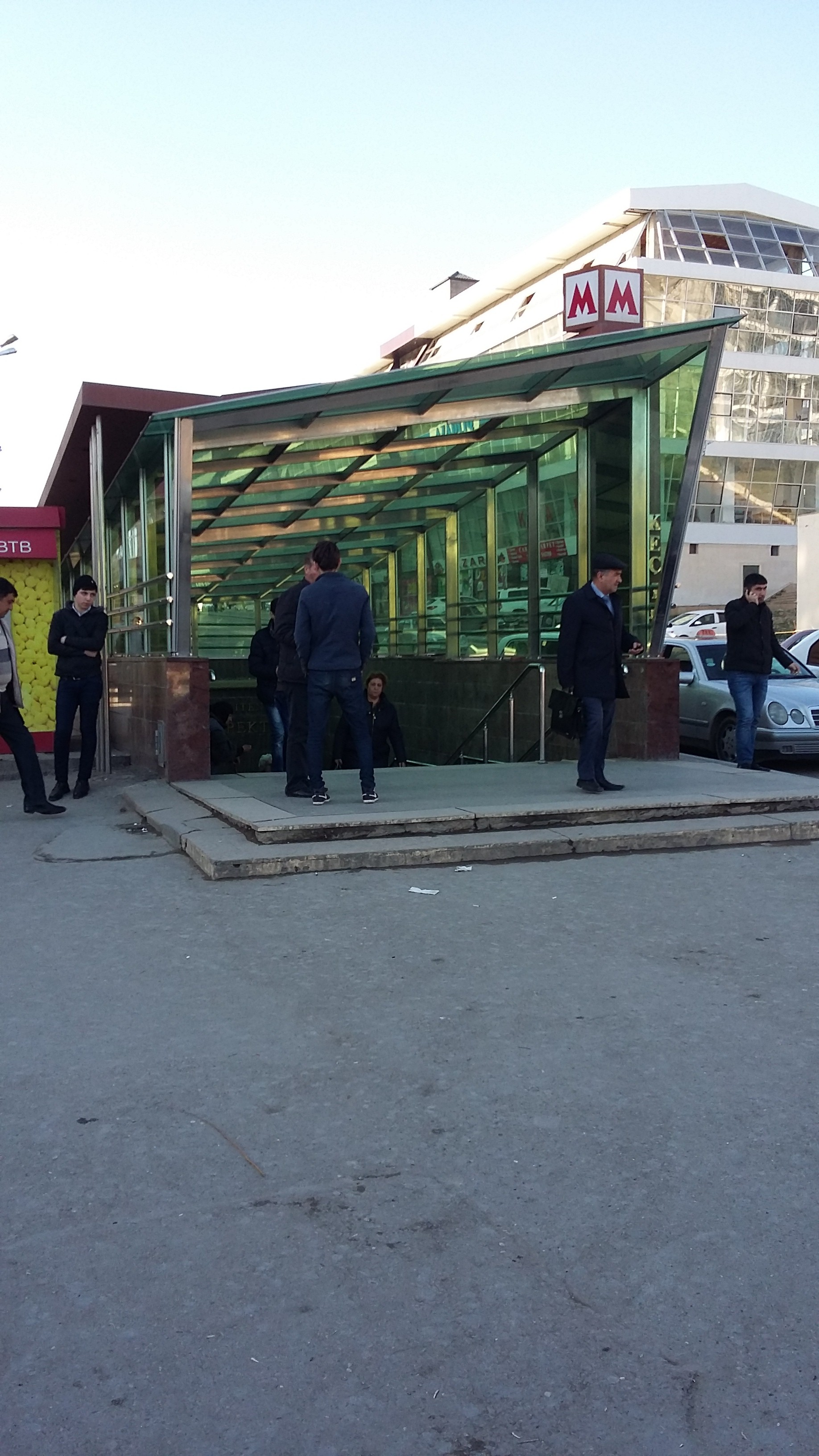

General information
- Location: Baku, Azerbaijan
- Coordinates: 40°25′34″N 49°50′28″E
- System: Baku Metro station
- Owner: Baku Metro
- Line: Green line
- Tracks: 2
- Connections: 3, 6, 45, 71, 88, 88A, 93, 100, 108A, 108B, 123, 147, 179, 202 (future); Yellow Line; Tram

History
- Opened: 30 December 2009

Services
Preceding station	Baku Metro	Following station
Darnagul Terminus	Green line	Nasimi towards Hazi Aslanov or Bakmil
Location

Azadlıq prospekti is a Baku Metro station. It was opened on 30 December 2009.

== See also ==
- List of Baku metro stations
- Azadliq Square, Baku
