= Nizami Gəncəvi (Baku Metro) =

Metro station in Baku, Azerbaijan

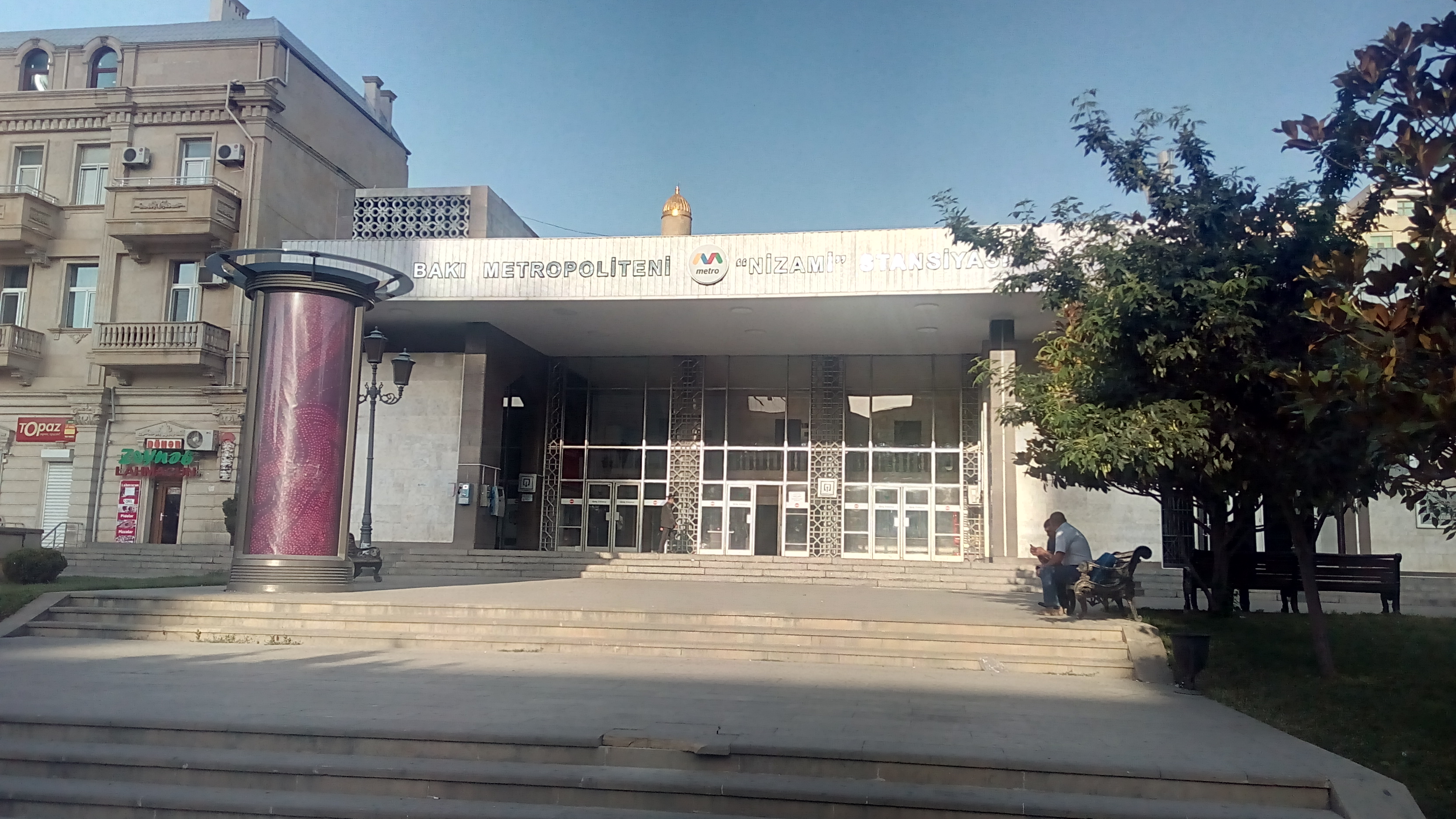

General information
- Location: Baku, Azerbaijan
- Coordinates: 40.3793°N 49.8302°E
- System: Baku Metro station
- Owner: Baku Metro
- Line: Green line
- Tracks: 2
- Connections: 2, 14, 33, 52, 65, 79, 96 (future) Purple line Yellow Line

History
- Opened: 31 December 1976

Services
Preceding station	Baku Metro	Following station
Elmler Akademiyasi towards Darnagul	Green line	28 May towards Hazi Aslanov or Bakmil
Location

Nizami Ganjavi (Azerbaijani: Nizami Gəncəvi) is a Baku Metro station. It opened up on 31 December 1976. It is named after medieval Muslim poet Nizami Ganjavi. This station is located nearby to Courtyard Baku Hotel.

== Gallery ==
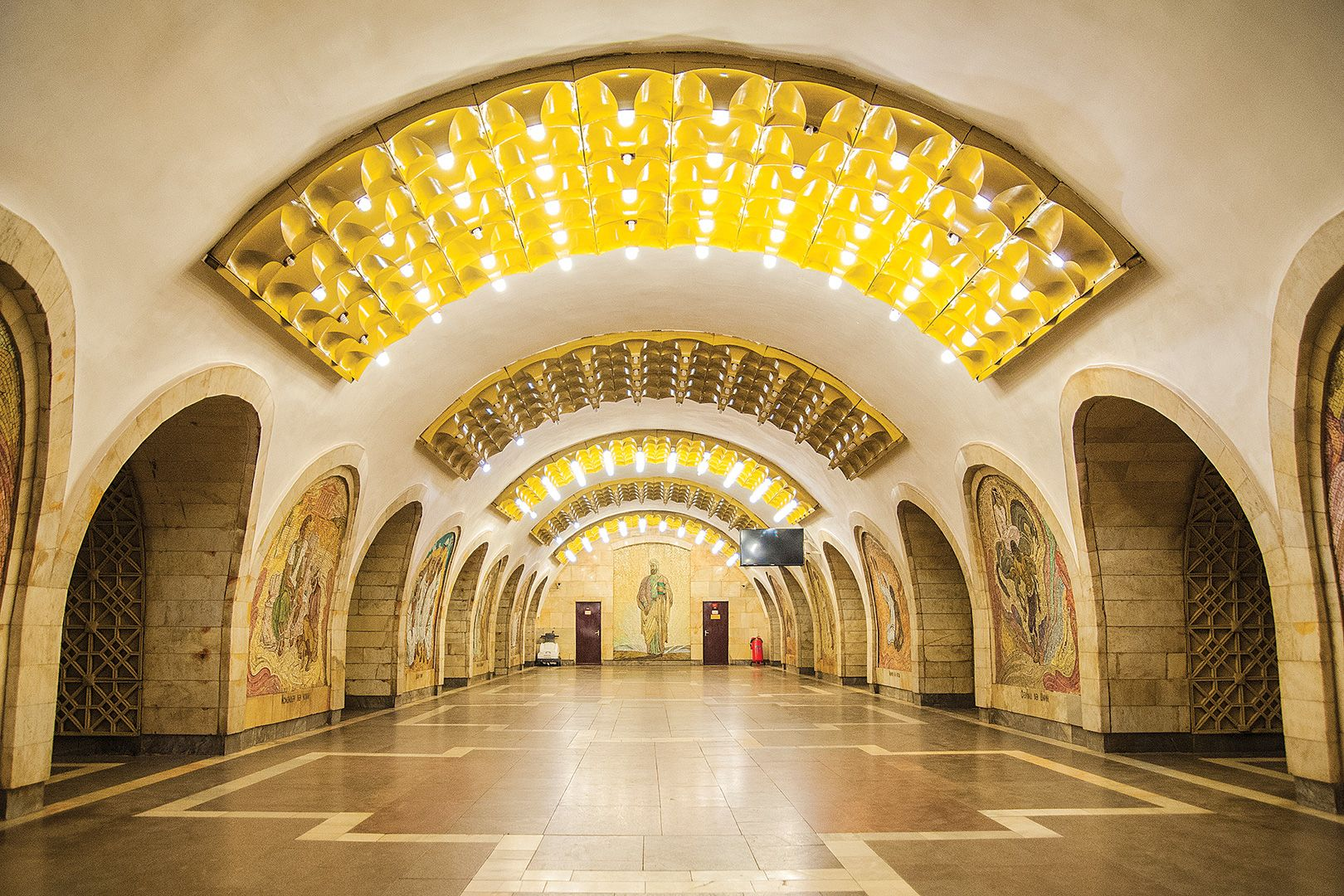
Nizami Metro Station

== See also ==
- List of Baku metro stations
