= 8 Noyabr (Baku Metro) =

Baku Metro Station

8 November
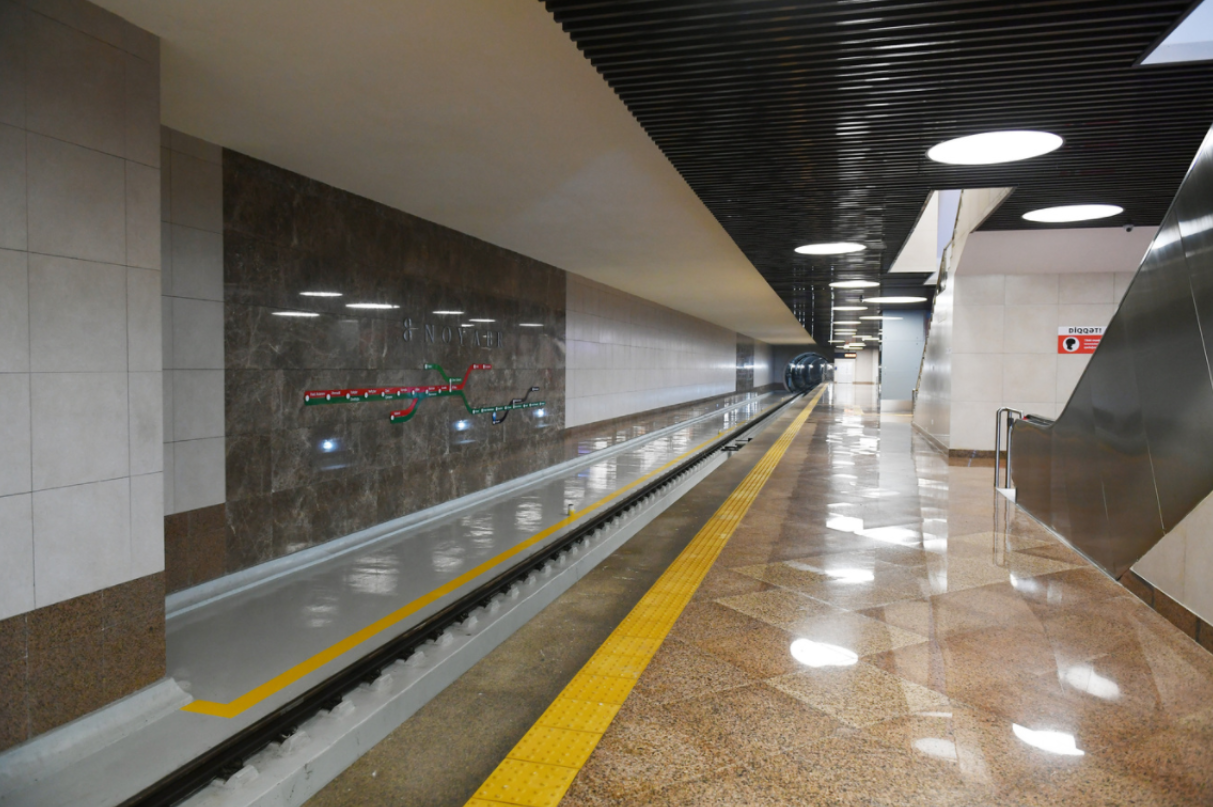

General information
- Location: Baku; Azerbaijan
- Coordinates: 40.401111°N 49.821667°E
- System: Baku Metro station
- Owner: Baku Metro
- Line: Purple line
- Platforms: 1
- Connections: 7A, 7B, 52, 61, 67, 83, 199, 211 (future); Blue Line

Construction
- Depth: 12-22 m
- Accessible: Disabled access

History
- Opened: 29 May 2021

Services
Preceding station	Baku Metro	Following station
Memar Ajami towards Khojasan	Purple line	Terminus
Location

8 November (Azerbaijani: 8 Noyabr) is a station on the third (purple) line of the Baku Metro. The station was named to commemorate Victory Day of Azerbaijan.

== History ==
Preparations for the construction of B-3 and B-4 stations started back in 2012, when the traffic on Ceyhun Selimov Street and Jalil Mammadguluzade Street for each station, respectively, was blocked. Over the next 4 years, tunnels were laid from Memar Ajami-2 station. After the opening of the first two stations of the purple line, the Baku Metro announced that the third station would open in 2018.

The station was planned to be opened in 2018, but the work was not completed and the opening was postponed to 2019. The deputy chairman of CJSC Baku Metro stated that there was a delay due to natural and geological problems. A new station opening date of 2020 was announced, but the works were also not completed on time.

On 8 December, by order of Azerbaijani President Ilham Aliyev, the station was named "8 November", in honour of the victory in the Second Karabakh War. The Cabinet of Ministers' decision states:

"On the initiative of the President of the Republic of Azerbaijan, Commander-in-Chief of the Armed Forces Ilham Aliyev the new station of the Baku Metro, located at 1065 block Ceyhun Salimov Street, Nasimi district, was named "November 8".

The official opening took place on 29 May 2021, when the station was visited by the President of Azerbaijan, Ilham Aliyev.

== See also ==
- List of Baku metro stations
- Elmler Akademiyasi (Baku Metro)
- Hezi Aslanov (Baku Metro)
- Victory Day (Azerbaijan)
