= Sahil (Baku Metro) =

Baku Metro station

Coordinates: 40.3953°N 49.8822°E

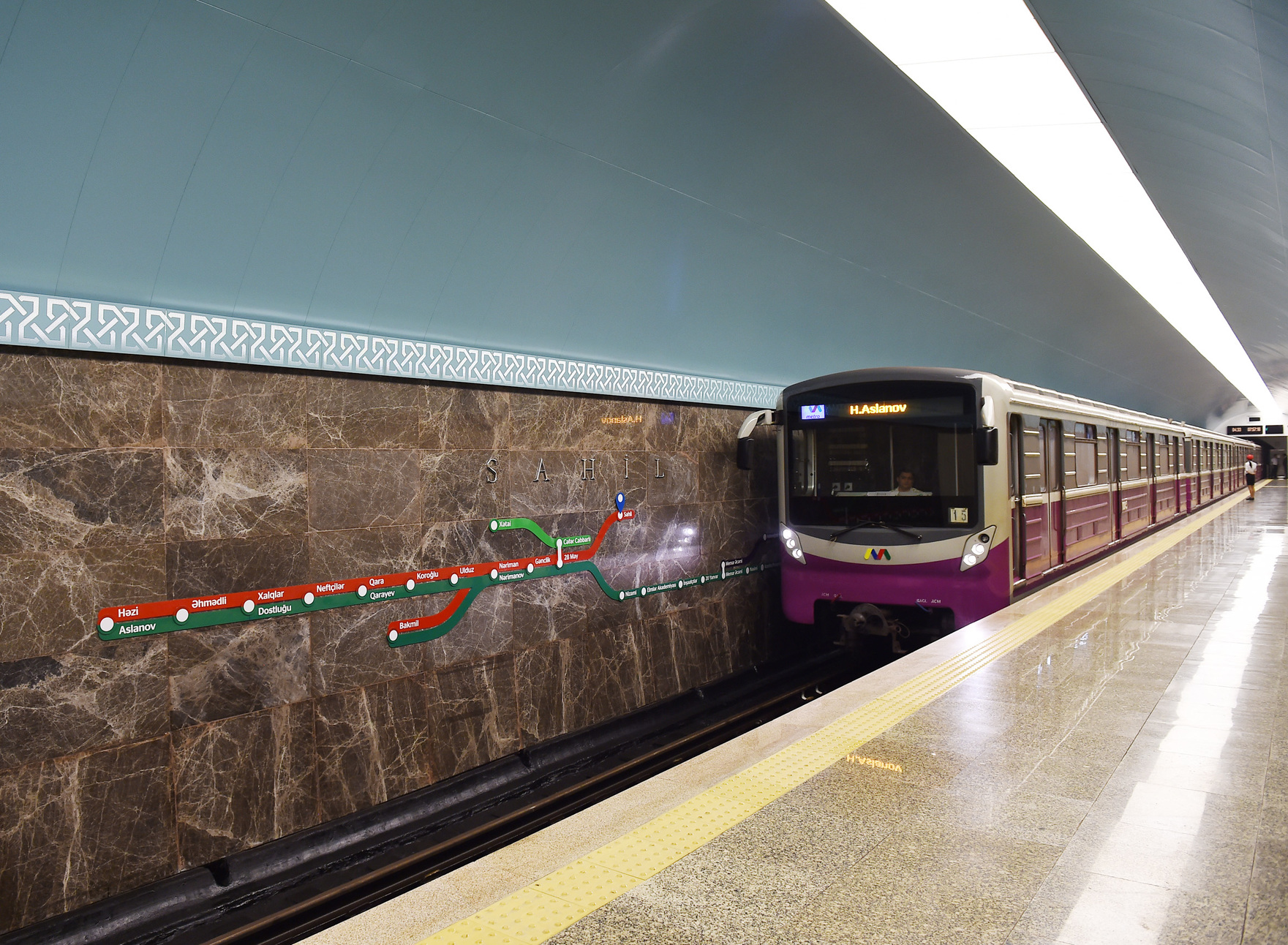
- Sahil Metro Station (Train 81-717M/714M Type with new front-Modernized locally by Baku Metro LLC)

General information
- Location: Baku, Azerbaijan
- System: Baku Metro station
- Owner: Baku Metro
- Line: Red line
- Tracks: 2
- Connections: 5, 10, 18, 88, 125, 149, E1, E2 (future) Purple line

History
- Opened: 6 November 1967

Services
| Preceding station | Baku Metro | Following station |
|---|---|---|
| Icheri Sheher Terminus | Red line | 28 May towards Hazi Aslanov or Bakmil |
Location

Sahil is a station of Baku Metro. It was opened on 6 November 1967 as one of the first 5 stations in Baku. The station's former name 26 Baku Commissioner (Azerbaijani: 26 Bakı komissarı) is a Baku Metro station on Red Line (Line 1). This station is located nearby InterContinental Hotel.

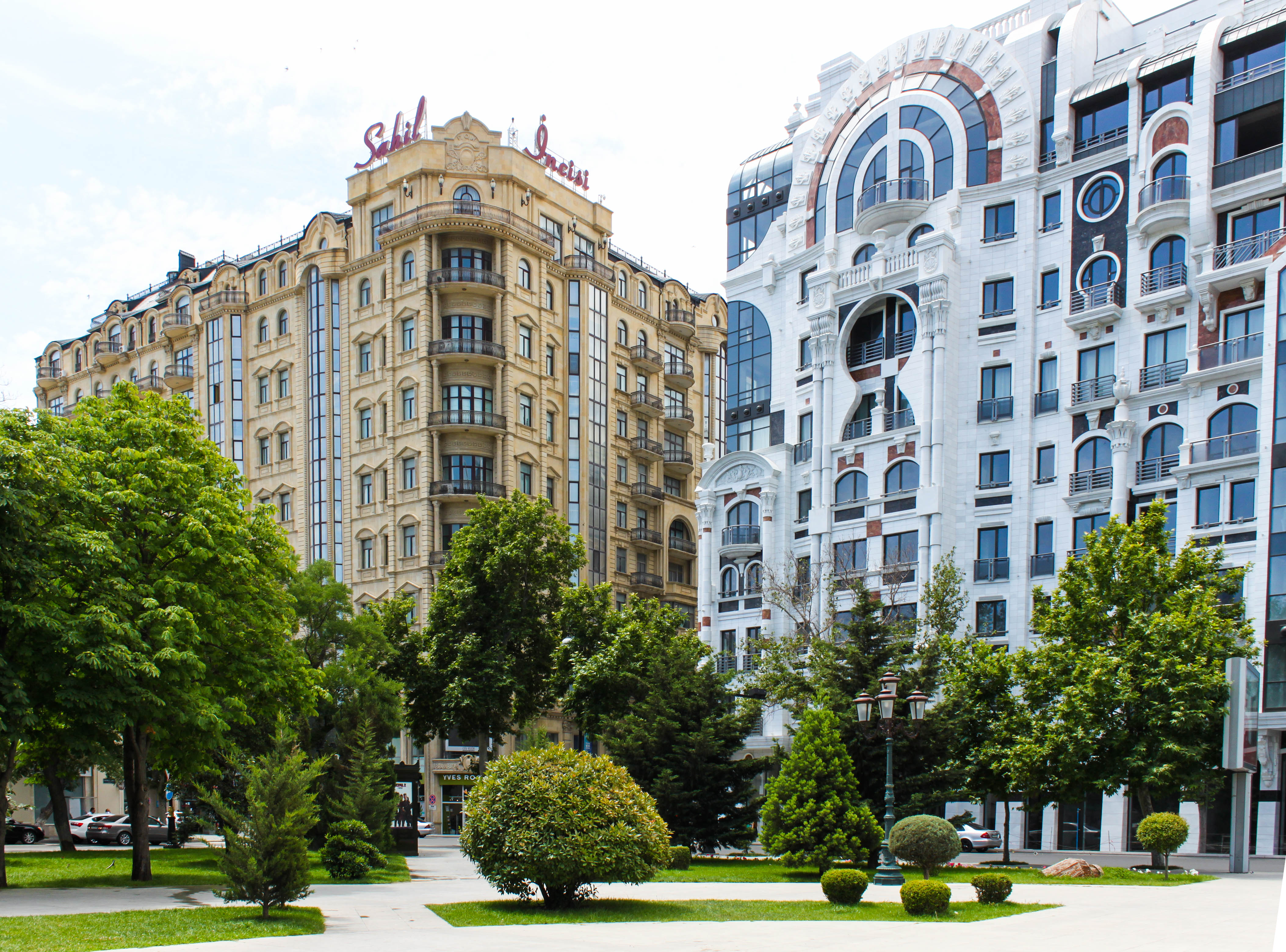
Panoramic view of Sahil Metro and Sahil Garden

== See also ==
- List of Baku metro stations
- Baku Boulevard
