= Baku Metro =

Metro system of Baku, Azerbaijan

- Icherisheher Metro Station

Overview
- Native name: Bakı metropoliteni
- Owner: Baku Metro CJSC (Parent Company AZCON Holding))
- Locale: Baku, Azerbaijan
- Transit type: Rapid transit
- Number of lines: 3
- Number of stations: 27
- Daily ridership: 627,279 (daily average, 2024)
- Annual ridership: ▲229.6 million (2024)
- Chief executive: Vusal Aslanov
- Website: Baku Metro

Operation
- Began operation: November 6, 1967; 59 years ago
- Operator: Bakı Metropoliteni
- Number of vehicles: 228

Technical
- System length: 40.7 km (25.3 mi)
- Track gauge: 1,520 mm (4 ft 11 27/32 in) Russian gauge
- Electrification: Third rail, 825V DC
System map
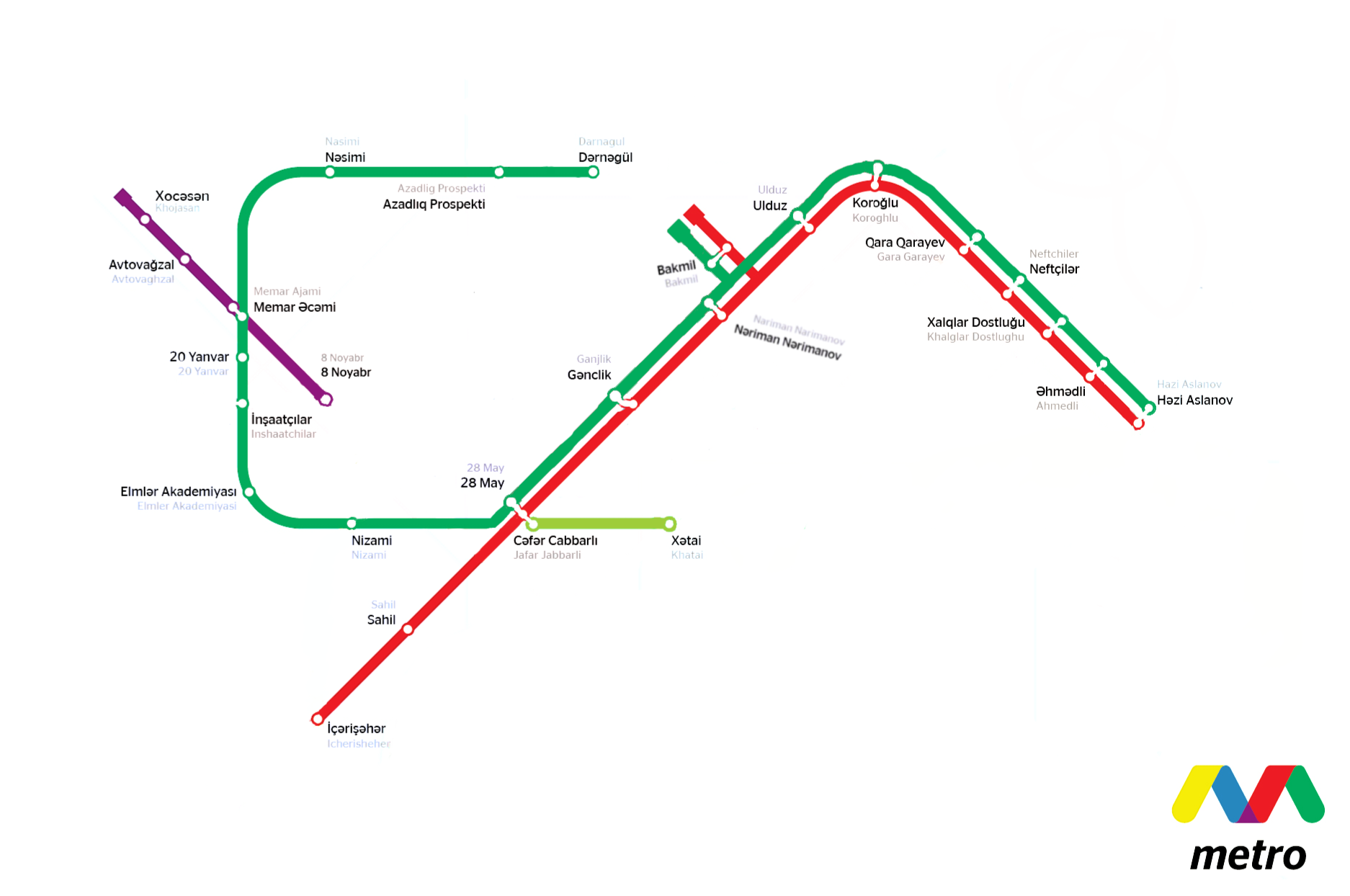
Baku Metro map

Baku Metro (Azerbaijani: Bakı metropoliteni) is a rapid transit system serving Baku, the capital of Azerbaijan. First opened on 6 November 1967 when Azerbaijan was part of the Soviet Union, its features are typical of former Soviet systems, including very deep central stations and exquisite decorations that blend traditional Azerbaijani national motifs with Soviet ideology. At present, the system has 40.7 kilometres (25.3 mi) of bidirectional tracks, made up of three lines served by 27 stations. The Baku Metro is the only rapid transit system in Azerbaijan. Baku Metro was the fifth metro in the Soviet Union and the thirty-fourth in the world. In 2015, it carried 222.0 million, passengers, an average daily ridership of approximately 608,200. In 2024, it carried 229.6 million, an average daily ridership of 627,279.

Baku Metro Closed Joint-Stock Company (Baku Metro CJSC) or (LLC Limited Liability Company), the company which runs the Baku Metro, was founded according Decree No. 289 Of the President of the Republic of Azerbaijan on February 27, 2014, as a legal successor to Baku Metro and Azertunelmetrotikinti Joint Stock Company. Property along with rights and obligations of Baku Metro and Azertunelmetrotikinti Joint Stock Company were transferred to the newly established Baku Metro CJSC.

== History ==
During the final decades of the Russian Empire the port city of Baku became a large metropolis due to the discovery of oil in the Caspian Sea. By the 1930s, it was the capital of the Azerbaijani SSR and the largest city in Soviet Transcaucasia. The first plans for a rapid-transit system date to the 1930s, with the adoption of a new general plan for city development. After World War II, the population passed the one million mark, a requirement of Soviet law for construction of a metro system. In 1947, the Soviet Cabinet of Ministers issued a decree authorizing its construction, which began in 1951. On November 6, 1967, Baku Metro became the Soviet Union's fifth rapid-transit system when the first 6.5 kilometres (4.0 mi) of track and a depot were inaugurated, in honor of the fiftieth anniversary of the October Revolution.

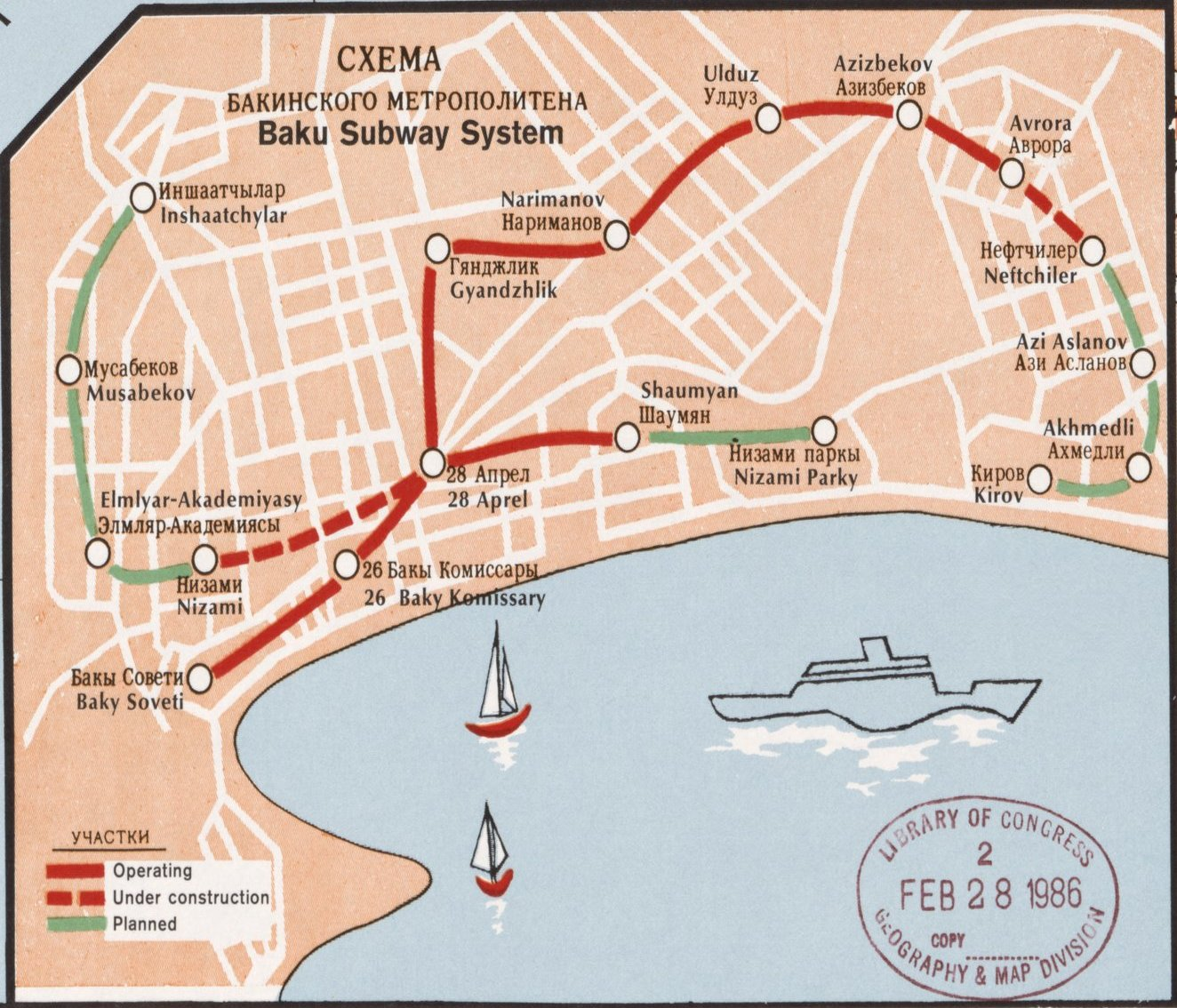
Baku Subway System 1970

Due to the city's unique landscape, Baku Metro did not have the typical Soviet "triangle" layout of development, and instead had two elliptical lines which crossed each other in the center of the city at the Baku railway station. Thus, one line would begin at the southwestern end of the city, and cross on a northeastern axis to follow the residential districts on the northern edge of the city and then snake along to the southeastern and ultimately southern end. This was inaugurated in three stages: Ulduz (1970) and Neftçilər (1972), followed by Ahmedli (1989) and finally Hazi Aslanov (2002), completing the first line. Additionally, in 1970 a branch was opened to a station built in a depot, Bakmil.

The second line was to parallel the Caspian coast from Hazi Aslanov through Baku's industrial districts, meeting the first line again at the Baku Railway Terminal, and then continuing westwards before turning north to join Baku's northwestern districts. To accelerate construction, a branch was opened from May 28 station to Khatai in 1968, and in 1976 in the opposite direction towards Nizami. The second and first line used the same station (May 28). This posed no serious problems initially, as the line was two stations long, but when the second stage opened in 1985, lengthening the line to 8 stations (Memar Ajemi), construction of a transfer was desperately needed.

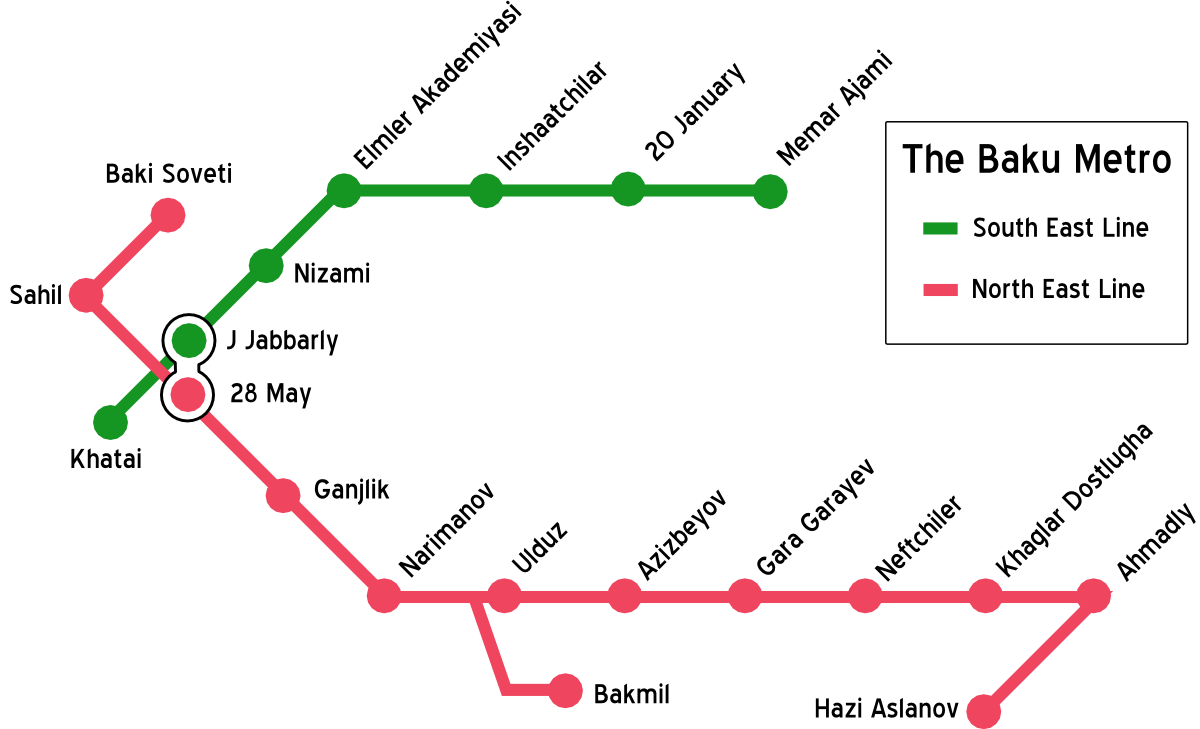
Baku Metro Map 2002

In 1993, the first stage of the transfer station Jafar Jabbarli came in operation, but the end of the Soviet Union, political unrest, the First Nagorno-Karabakh War and the financial collapse which followed effectively paralyzed any construction attempts in Baku. Furthermore, during the mid-1990s, three mass casualty incidents took place: on March 19 and July 3, 1994, terrorist attacks killed 27 people and injured another 91, and on October 28 of the following year a fire in a crowded train killed 289 and injured 265 others, the world's deadliest subway disaster.

In the late 1990s, construction restarted. The first project was the completion of Hazi Aslanov station, partly sponsored by the European Union. In the mid-2000s, construction of the northern end of the second line, abandoned since 1994, was restarted with Nasimi station opening on October 9, 2008.

== Network ==
Evolution of Baku Metro

=== Lines ===
| Line | Segment | Date opened | Last extension | Length | Stations |
|---|---|---|---|---|---|
| Red | Icheri Sheher ↔ Hazi Aslanov | 1967 | 10 December 2002 | 20.1 km | 13 |
| Green | Darnagul ↔ Hazi Aslanov | 1976 | 29 June 2011 | 12.2 km | 8 |
| Green | Shah Ismail Khatai ↔ Jafar Jabbarly | 1968 | 27 October 1993 | 2.3 km | 2 |
| Purple | Khojasan ↔ 8 Noyabr | 2016 | 23 December 2022 | 6.1 km | 4 |

=== Timeline ===
| Segment | Date opened | Length |
|---|---|---|
| Icheri Sheher – Nariman Narimanov | November 6, 1967 | 6.5 km |
| 28 May – Shah Ismail Khatai | February 22, 1968 | 2.3 km |
| Nariman Narimanov – Ulduz | May 5, 1970 | 2.1 km |
| Nariman Narimanov – Bakmil | September 25, 1970 (reconstructed in 1978–79) | 0.5 km |
| Ulduz – Neftchilar | November 7, 1972 | 5.3 km |
| 28 May – Nizami Ganjavi | December 31, 1976 | 2.2 km |
| Nizami Ganjavi – Memar Ajami | December 31, 1985 | 6.5 km |
| Neftchilar – Ahmedli | April 28, 1989 | 3.3 km |
| Jafar Jabbarly - Shah Ismail Khatai | December 27, 1993 | 2.3 km |
| Ahmedli – Hazi Aslanov | December 10, 2002 | 1.4 km |
| Memar Ajami – Nasimi | October 9, 2008 | 2.1 km |
| Nasimi – Azadliq prospekti | December 30, 2009 | 1.3 km |
| Azadliq prospekti – Darnagul | June 29, 2011 | 1.5 km |
| Avtovağzal – Memar Ajami | April 19, 2016 | 2.1 km |
| Memar Ajami – 8 Noyabr | May 29, 2021 | 1.6 km |
| Avtovağzal – Khojasan | December 23, 2022 | 2.4 km |
| Total | 27 stations | 40.7 km |

=== Renaming of stations ===
| Old | New | Date of renaming |
|---|---|---|
| Şaumyan | Xətai | May 11, 1990 |
| 26 Bakı Komissarı | Sahil | April 9, 1992 |
| XI Qızıl Ordu Meydanı | 20 Yanvar | April 27, 1992 |
| 28 Aprel | 28 May | April 9, 1992 |
| Avrora | Qara Qarayev | April 27, 1992 |
| Elektrozavod | Bakmil | January 1, 1993 |
| Bakı Soveti | İçәrişәhәr | April 25, 2007 |
| Məşədi Əzizbəyov | Koroğlu | December 30, 2011 |

== Expansion plans ==
At present, there are several expansion projects planned, two of which are under construction. In 2011, the Chief Executive of the Baku Metro, Taghi Ahmadov, announced plans to construct up to 53 new stations by 2030. Currently, eight stations and one train depot is under construction for Green Line. These will serve the new bus complex as well as Heydar Aliyev International Airport.

The signalling, supervision and telecommunication systems for Phase 1 of the Purple Line will be upgraded by Thales.

Three new stations were planned to open by 2015, according to Ahmadov; Avtovağzal Bus Terminal was scheduled to open in late 2012 (delayed to 2016), while Old Gunashli and New Gunashli were planned to begin operating before 2015 (not yet open).

Construction of the intermediate section of the Green Line, between Khatai and Hazi Aslanov along Nobel Avenue, began in August 2013 by a French–Ukrainian consortium.

The Baku Metro will be refitted with modern technologies. The new stations will be able to handle trains with up to seven cars.The stations will feature modern platforms, lobbies, escalators, and new signalling and control systems.

Most recent updated expansion plan consists of 5 lines, 77 stations and about 119 km total length of network. However, there is potential for future expansion of Baku Metro to 7 lines, 135 stations and about 200km network.

== Current construction ==
=== Lines ===
| Line | Segment | Date to open | Length | Stations |
|---|---|---|---|---|
| Green | Y-17 ↔ Y-18 | before 2040 | ~3 km | 1 |
| Green | Shah Ismail Khatai ↔ Hazi Aslanov | ~2030 | ~7.0 km | 4 |
| Green | Darnagul ↔ Darnagul Depot | 2027 | ~1 km | 1 |
| Purple | 8 November ↔ 20 September | 2026 | 1.2 km | 1 |

== Under planning ==
=== Lines ===
| Line | Segment | Date to open | Length | Stations |
|---|---|---|---|---|
| Red | Icheri Sheher ↔ Q-3 | ~2040 | ~3.8 km | 2 |
| Red | Q-3 ↔ Q-1 Badamdar | after 2040 | ~6.2 km | 2 |
| Red | Hazi Aslanov ↔ Q-19 Zykh | after 2040 | ~3 km | 2 |
| Green | Darnagul ↔ Y-1 | after 2030 | ~7.0 km | 3 |
| Green | Y-1 ↔ Y-18 | ~2040 | ~10 km | 5 |
| Green | Y-14 ↔ Y-17 | ~2031 | ~7.0 km | 3 |
| Purple | 20 September↔ Keshla | ~2030 | ~7.0 km | 4 |
| Purple | B-8 ↔ B-12 | after 2040 | ~10 km | 4 |
| Blue | M-1 Yeni Yasamal ↔ M-11 | after 2040 | 16.3 km | 11 |
| Yellow | S-1 Binagadi ↔ S-11 Bibiheybat | after 2040 | 14.7 km | 11 |

== Structural units ==
Baku Metro Closed Joint-Stock Company embracing such important areas like subway operation and construction, has the following structural units:

- Traffic service
- Depot Department
- Tunnel Facilities Services
- Traffic Services
- Electricity Supply Services
- Electromechanical Service
- Overhaul Services
- Alarm and Communication Services
- Automototransportation Services
- United workshops
- Construction Department
- Human Resources and Services Department
- Department of Perspective Development and Capital Construction Supervision
- Department of Finance

== Depots ==
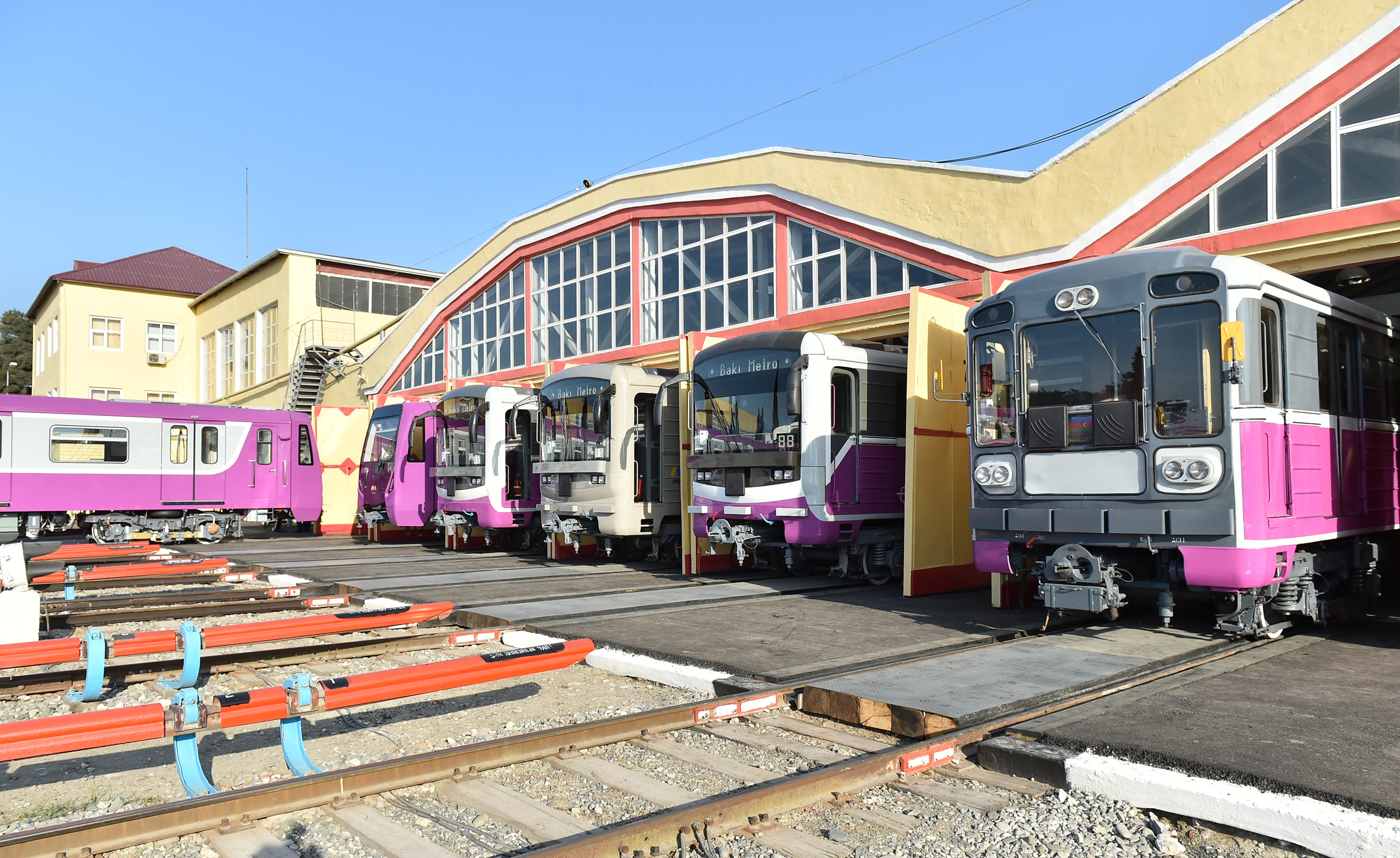
Baku Metro depot

- Bakmil Depot
  Red Line
- Darnagul Depot
  Green Line
- Khojasan Depot
  Purple Line
- Kohne Guneshli
  Green Line (planned)
- Ramana Depot
  Blue Line (planned)
- Binagadi Depot
  Yellow Line (planned)

== Operation ==
Officially Baku Metro has two lines, however due to problems with opening the second part of Cəfər Cabbarlı, Baku instead operates as a large four branch system, with trains travelling from Həzi Aslanov to either İçərişəhər or Dərnəgul, branching at May 28 (beneath the main train station). Rare services from both Dərnəgul and İçərişəhər also terminate at Bakmil, but only twice per hour. There is a one-stop second line that operates separately between Cəfər Cabbarlı (essentially different platforms within the same station as May 28) and Şah İsmail Xətai, a shuttle service using only one of the two tracks due to low demand. The second interchange station is “Memar Əcəmi" where Green and Violet Lines cross.

Due to the city's uneven landscape, some stations are very deep, that could double as bomb shelters in case of a nuclear war attack, given that the system was built at the height of the Cold War in the 1950s/early 1960s. All seven of these deep level stations have a standard pylon design. The majority of the system's stations, 13, are shallow pillar-trispans. In addition, one station, Bakmil, is a single platform surface level.

Like many other former Soviet systems, most of the stations of the system are exquisitely decorated; many features advanced Soviet motives in artwork (including mosaics, sculpture and bas-reliefs) and architecture such as those of progress and international culture, whilst others focus on traditional Azeri culture and history. After the collapse of the Soviet Union, several stations were renamed, and some of their decoration was altered to comply with the new ideology.

=== Ticketing ===
The system works on a flat fare of 60 gapiks (0.60 AZN) per trip, following a price hike on October 1, 2025. Some Baku residents were reportedly unhappy with the price hike, citing the age of the metro system's infrastructure. Until 2006, metro users accessed the stations with metal (later plastic) tokens placed into turnstiles. In 2006, the Baku Metro introduced an RFID card system using rechargeable fare cards, which require a 2-manat deposit (plus travel credit).

BakuCard is a single Smart Card for payment on Baku Metro and BakuBus. The intercity buses and metro use this type of card-based fare-payment system.

=== Wi-fi and mobile phone coverage ===
Work to install free Wi-Fi service at Koroghlu station is underway.

Local mobile service provider Nar Mobile has started to provide 3G coverage at Sahil, Nəsimi, 28 May, Memar Əcəmi, Azadlıq prospekti and Dərnəgül. Service will expand to all stations as well as to tunnels by May.

== Rolling stock ==
As of the beginning of 2020, 81-717/714 (including later modifications .5 .5B and .5M) and their modernized version 81-717M/714M, 81-760B/761B/763B "Oka" and 81-765.B/766.B stock trains are operating on the metro. 81-710 («Еж3») and 81-704/81-705/81-706 («Ем, Ема, Емх») stock trains were also operating on the metro until they were retired in 2008. As well as 81-703 («Е») and 81-707 («Еж») which were retired in 2001. All rolling stock on the Baku Metro has been produced by Metrowagonmash.

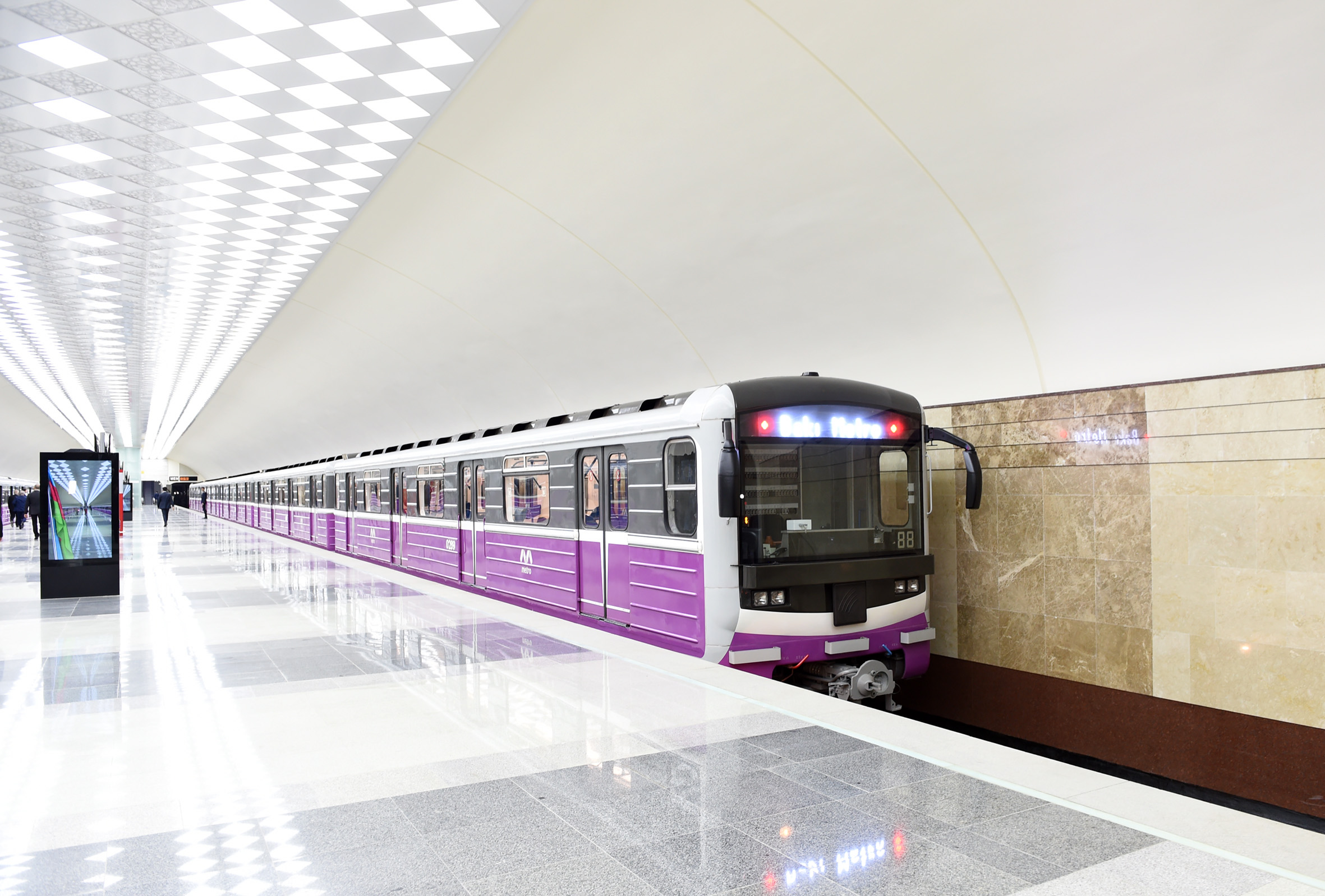
81-717M/714M Type with old front. (Modernized in Tbilisi, Georgia)

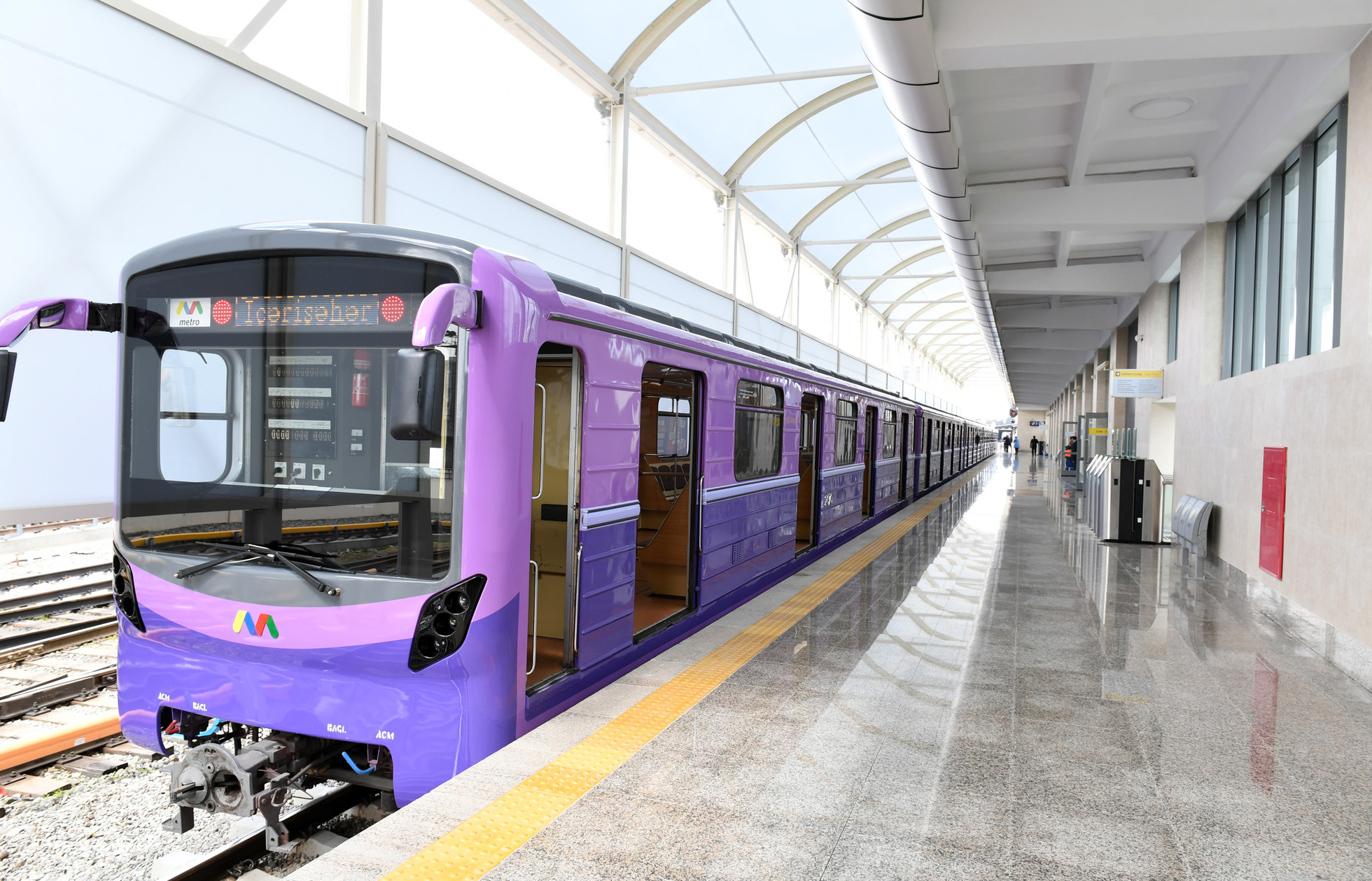
81-717M/714M Type with new front (Modernized locally by Baku Metro)

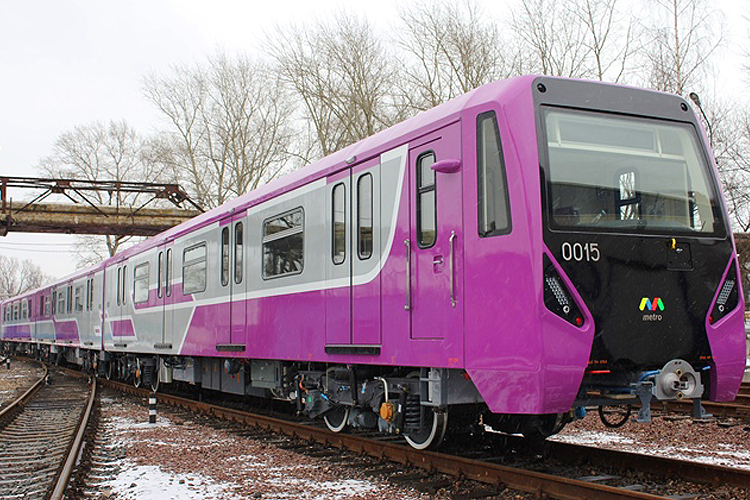
81-760B/761B/763B "Oka" Type.

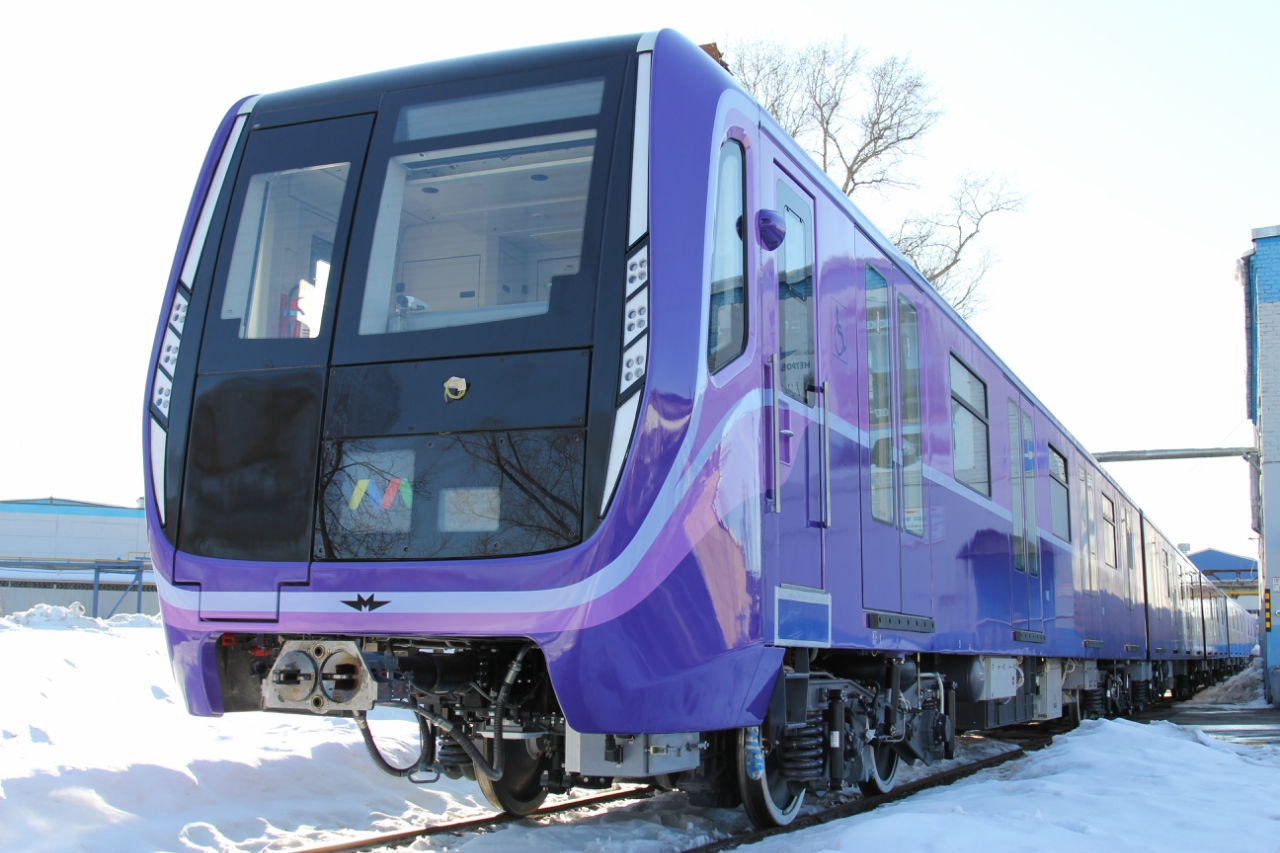
81-765.B/766.B "Moscow" Type.

Since 2014, the refurbishment of 81-717/714 (and their modifications .5 .5B and .5M) has been underway in Tbilisi's branch of ZREPS. During the refurbishment, the front car is fitted with a new fibreglass cab end similar to those operating on the Prague Metro. Inside the train, it is fitted with new cab instruments as well as new seats, although the interior is kept relatively the same. Aside from the visual changes, the train is also fitted with new electrical equipment. Since the beginning of the programme the design of the front ends has been altered and now features a different headlamp design and the shape has been slightly changed.

Baku Metro has redesigned Soviet-era trains to make them more modern and efficient. Also the new-generation metro trains ( 81-765 B/766B series) recently accepted by Baku Metro assembled locally by Baku Metro LLC on October 31, 2024.

At the end of 2012, Baku Metro loaned one 81-760/761 "Oka" type train to decide whether they will renew the fleet with a new model of train. On January 21, 2013, the train entered service on the Red Line ("Icheri-Sheher" to "Hezi Aslanov"/"Bakmil"). During the trial runs several breakdowns and failures occurred and in July 2013, the train was returned to Moscow. Later, the Baku Metro decided to purchase three five car "Oka" type trains with modified carriages fitted with through passage gangways. But, quickly abandoned the project and switched focus to a redesigned "Oka" type train built by Metrowagonmash. The train was classified as 81-760B/761B/763B "Oka" with a modified front end, newer interior equipment and electrical equipment. In April 2015, all three trains were delivered to Baku and began service on the Red line.

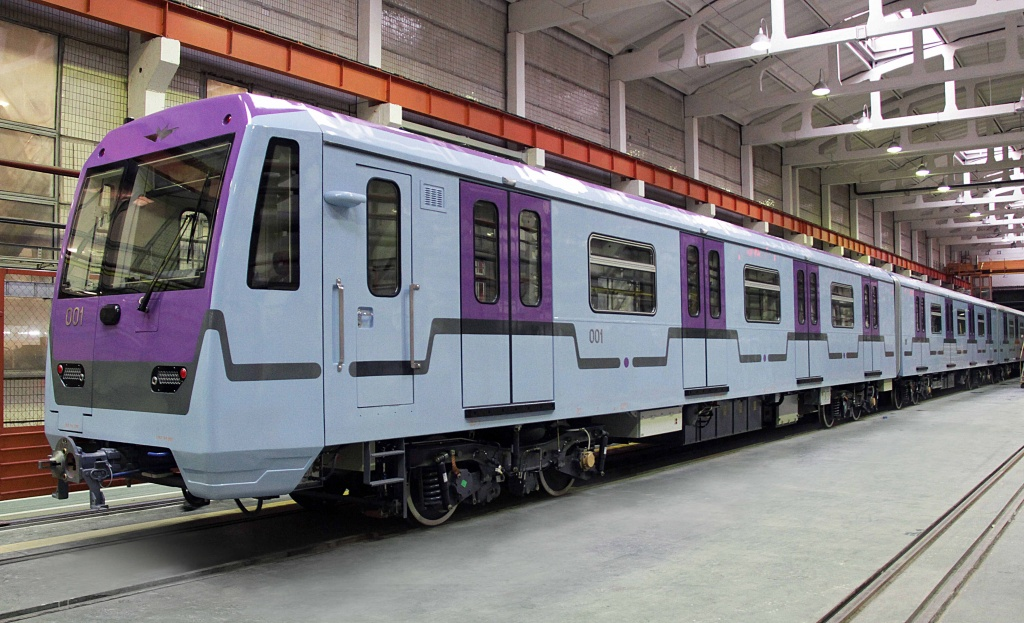
81-760A "Oka" Type planned for service with Baku Metro.

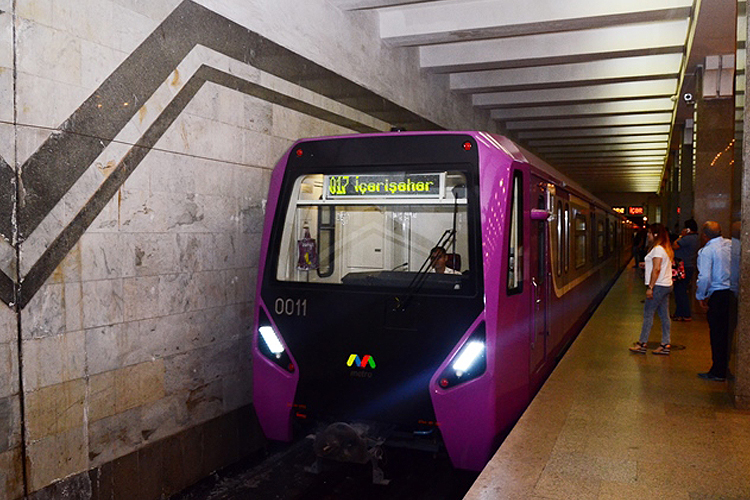
Modified 81-760B "Oka" Type in service on Red line.

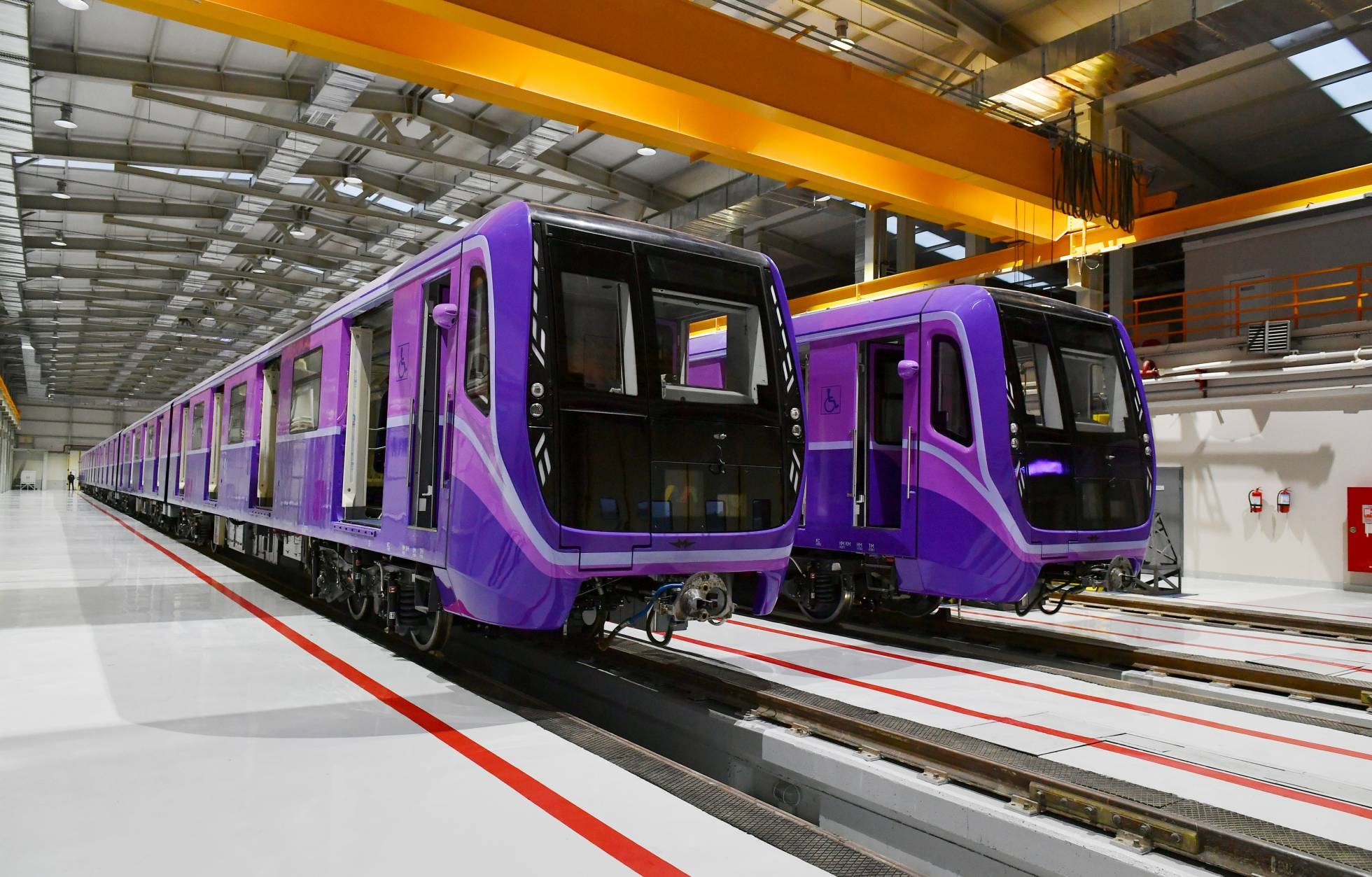
Khojasan depot of Baku Metro - 81-765-B trains

In February 2018, Baku Metro signed a contract with Metrovagonmash for the supply of two new 81-765 "Moscow" type trains. The first train was manufactured and shipped to Azerbaijan in March 2018 and from April 20, 2018, it began commercial operation. The trains are classified as 81-765.B/766.B and operate with only motor and head cars, no trailers, in order to increase traction. The second train was shipped in the same year. They are painted in a purple livery similar to the colour of the "Oka" type, just without the gray. As of December 2024, there are 27 81-765.B/766.B trains in Baku Metro.

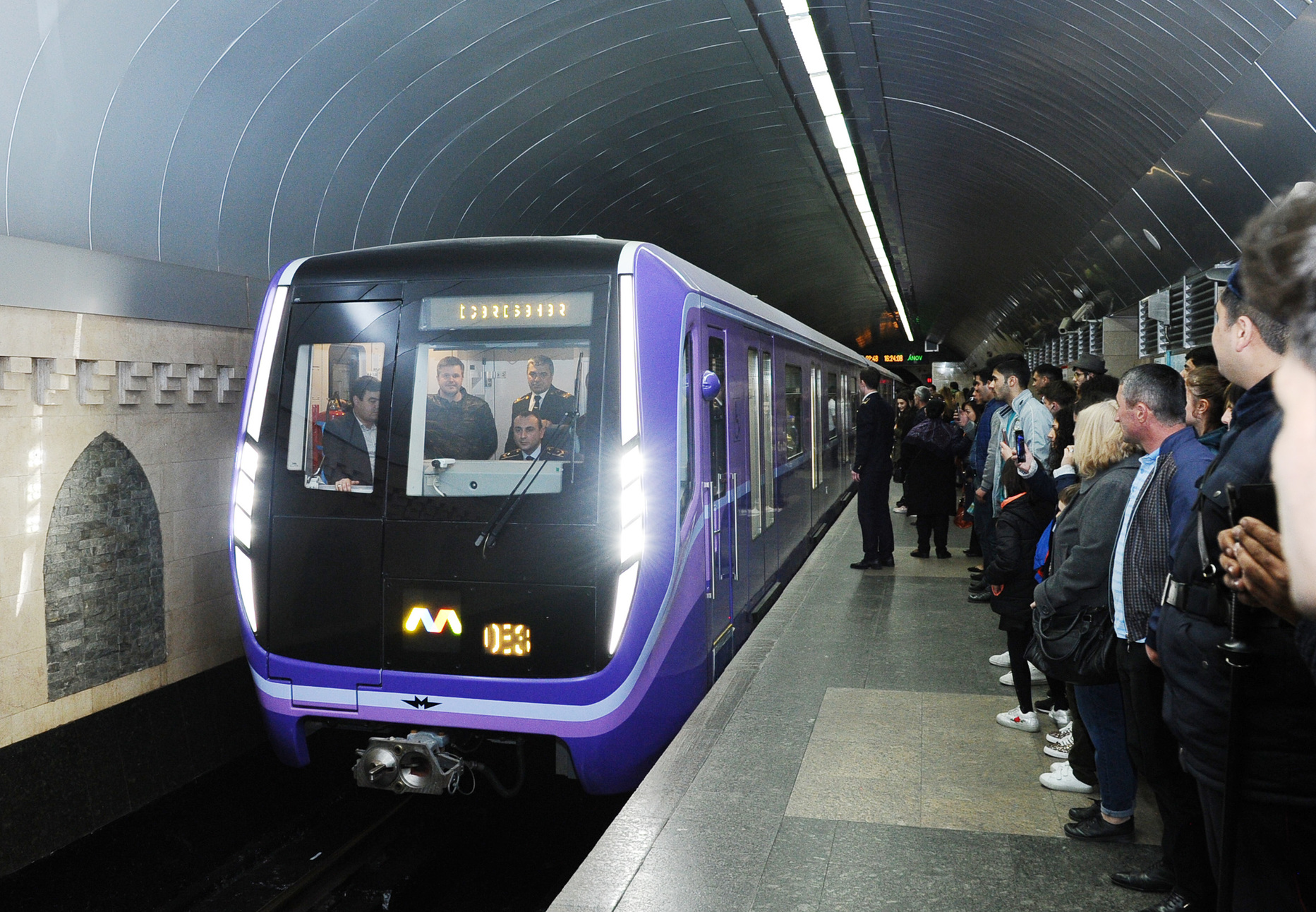
Front view of 81-765.B "Moscow" Train.

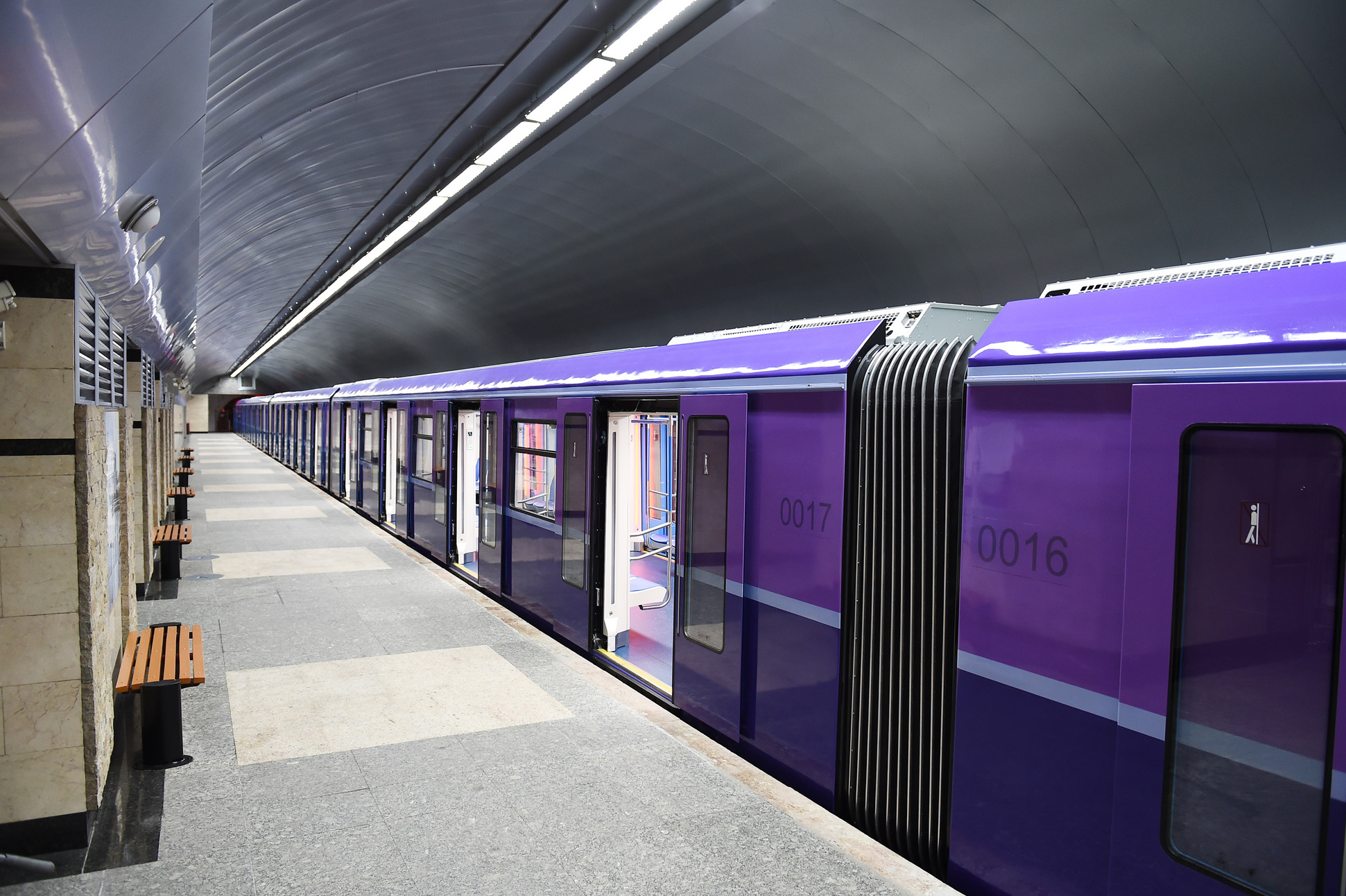
Trains feature interconnecting gangway.

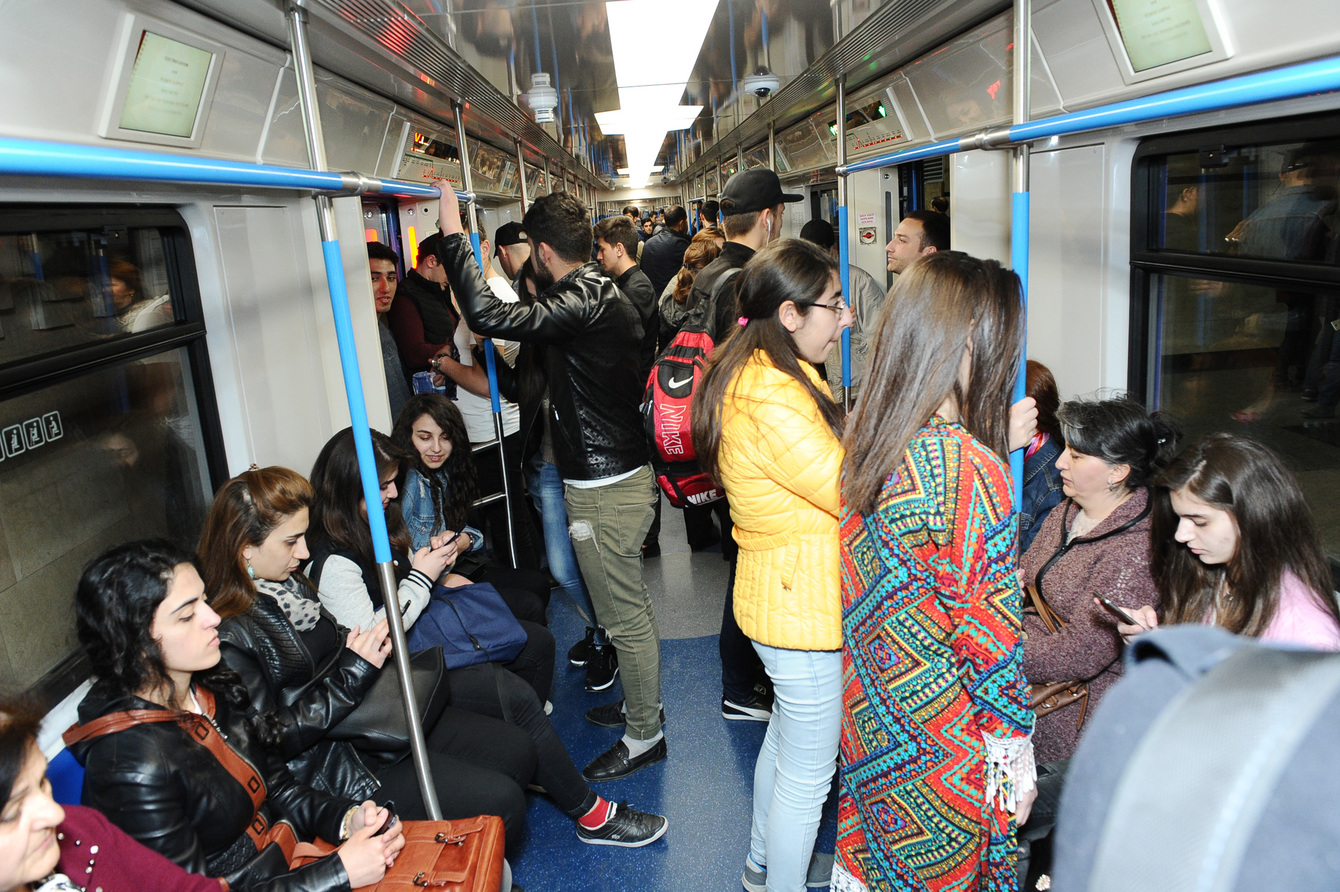
Modern and spacious interior.

Baku Metro is planning a major upgrade under its 2025–2030 Development Program, aiming to acquire up to 300 new, modern carriages to replace aging stock. The modernization includes installing advanced signaling systems (CBTC) and diversifying suppliers beyond Metrovagonmash to potentially include European or Chinese manufacturers, with financing supported by the EIB.

== Incidents ==
=== 1994 bombings ===
On March 19 and July 3, 1994, bombs killed 27 people and injured 91 others. Three Armenians were later arrested, charged and imprisoned in connection with the incident.

=== 1995 fire ===
On October 28, 1995, a fire broke out between the Ulduz and Nariman Narimanov stations, killing 289 people and injuring 265 others. The fire was deemed to have been caused by electrical malfunction, but the possibility of sabotage was not excluded. The fire remains the world's deadliest subway disaster in the world.

== See also ==
- List of Baku metro stations
- Baku suburban railway
- Trams in Baku
- Baku Transport Agency
- Transport in Azerbaijan
- List of metro systems
