= Shah Ismail Khatai (Baku Metro) =

Baku Metro Station

Shah Ismail Khatai Şah İsmail Xətai
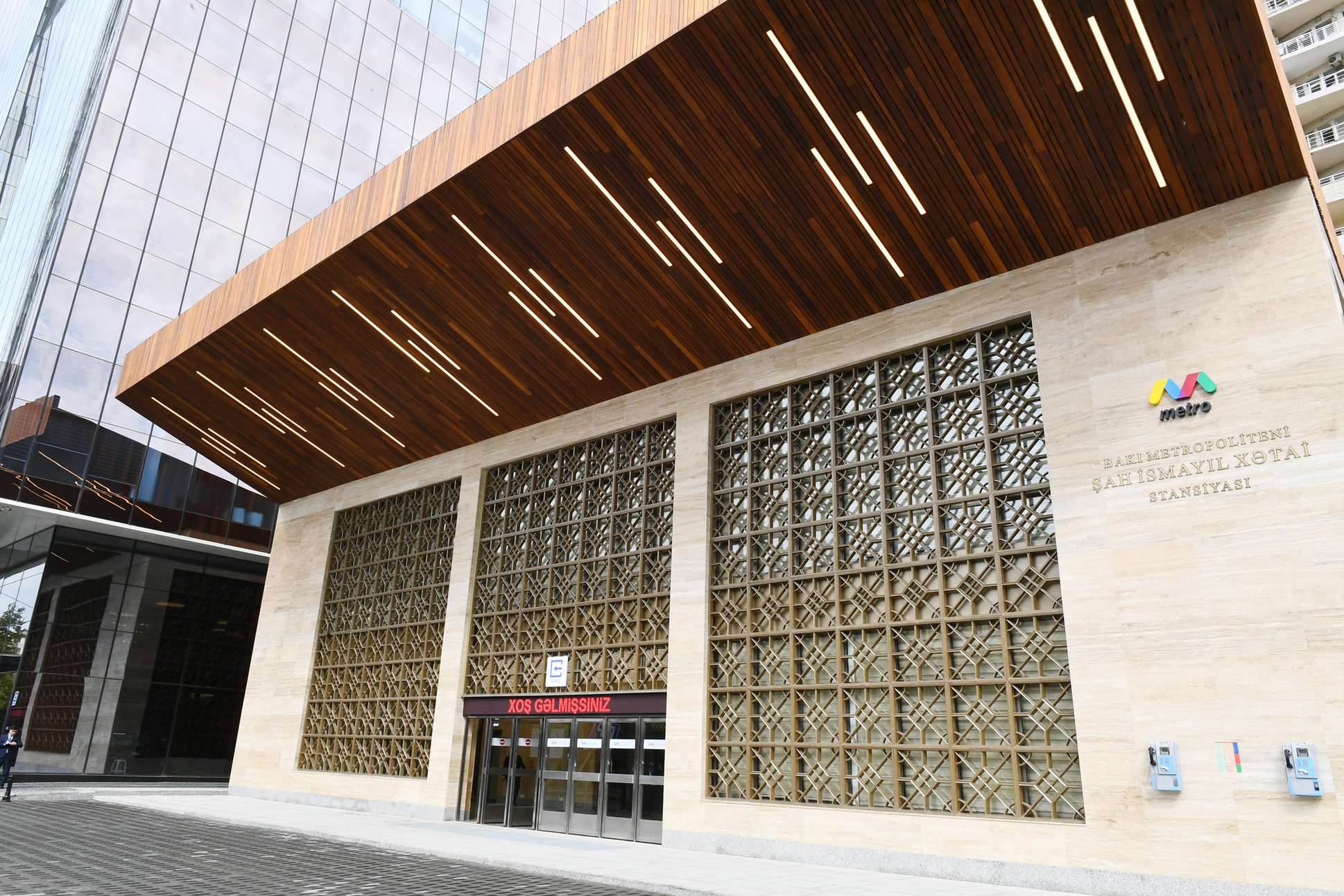

General information
- Location: Baku, Azerbaijan
- Coordinates: 40.3953°N 49.8822°E
- System: Baku Metro station
- Owner: Baku Metro
- Line: Green line
- Tracks: 1
- Connections: 4, 10, 21, 30, 32, 46, 49, 120 (future) Purple line

Construction
- Cycle facilities: Bike lane

History
- Opened: 28 February 1968

Services
Preceding station	Baku Metro	Following station
Jafar Jabbarly Terminus	Green line (separated part)	Terminus
Location

Shah Ismail Khatai (Azerbaijani: Şah İsmail Xətai) is a Baku Metro station. It was opened on 22 February 1968. It was formerly called "Shaumyan"; on 11 May 1990, it was renamed after Shah Ismail I Khatai.

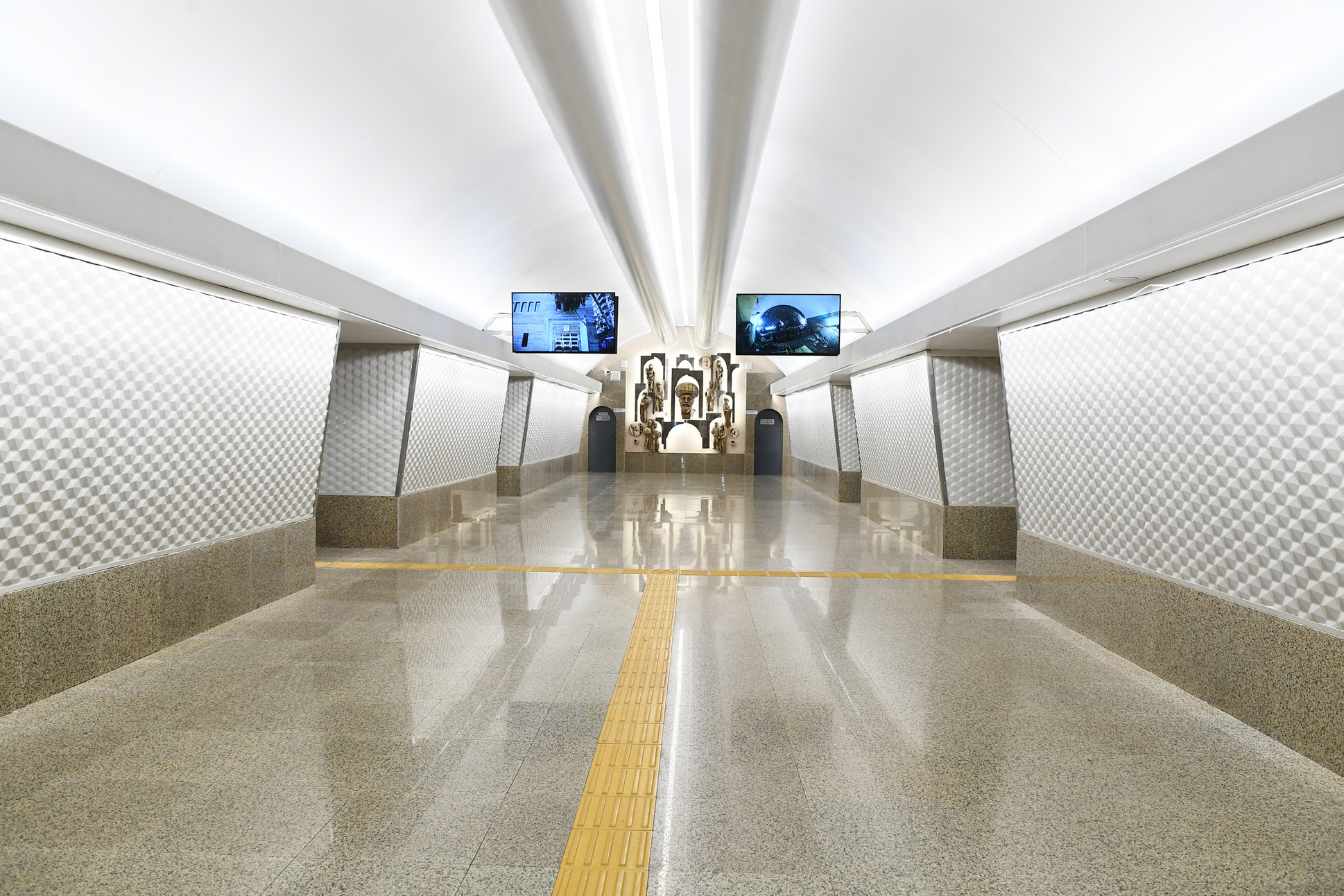
Interior of Khatai Metro Station

== See also ==
- List of Baku metro stations
