= Khojasan (Baku Metro) =

Baku Metro station

Khojasan Azerbaijani: Xocəsən
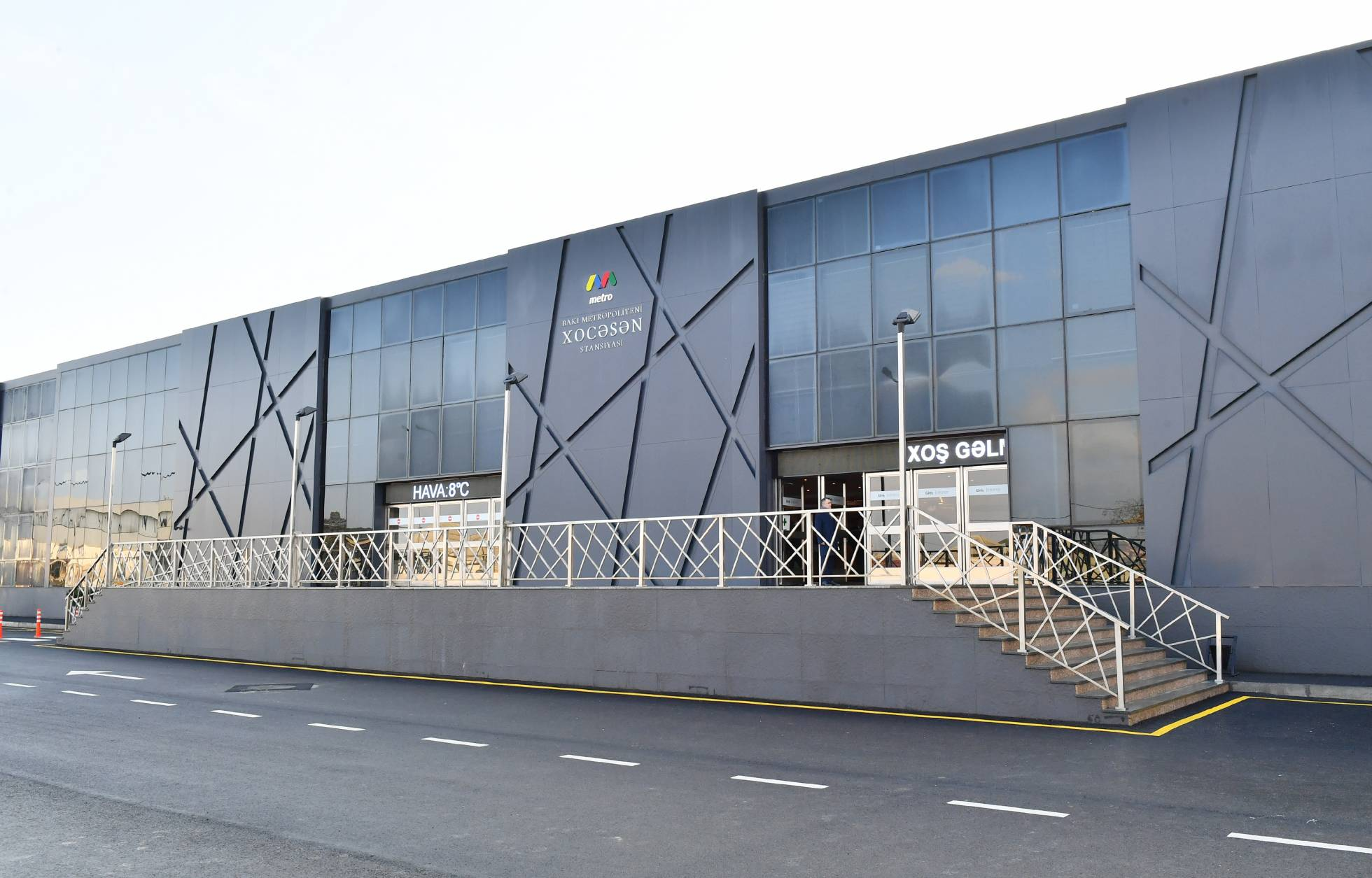
- Khojasan metro station

General information
- Location: Baku, Azerbaijan
- Coordinates: 40.421152°N 49.779066°E
- System: Baku Metro station
- Owner: Baku Metro
- Line: Purple line
- Tracks: 1
- Connections: 102, 130, 176, 539, 596

Construction
- Accessible: Disabled access

History
- Opened: 23 December 2022

Services
Preceding station	Baku Metro	Following station
Terminus	Purple line	Avtovağzal towards 8 Noyabr
Location

Khojasan (Azerbaijani: Xocəsən) is a Baku Metro station. It was opened on 23 December 2022.

== Gallery ==
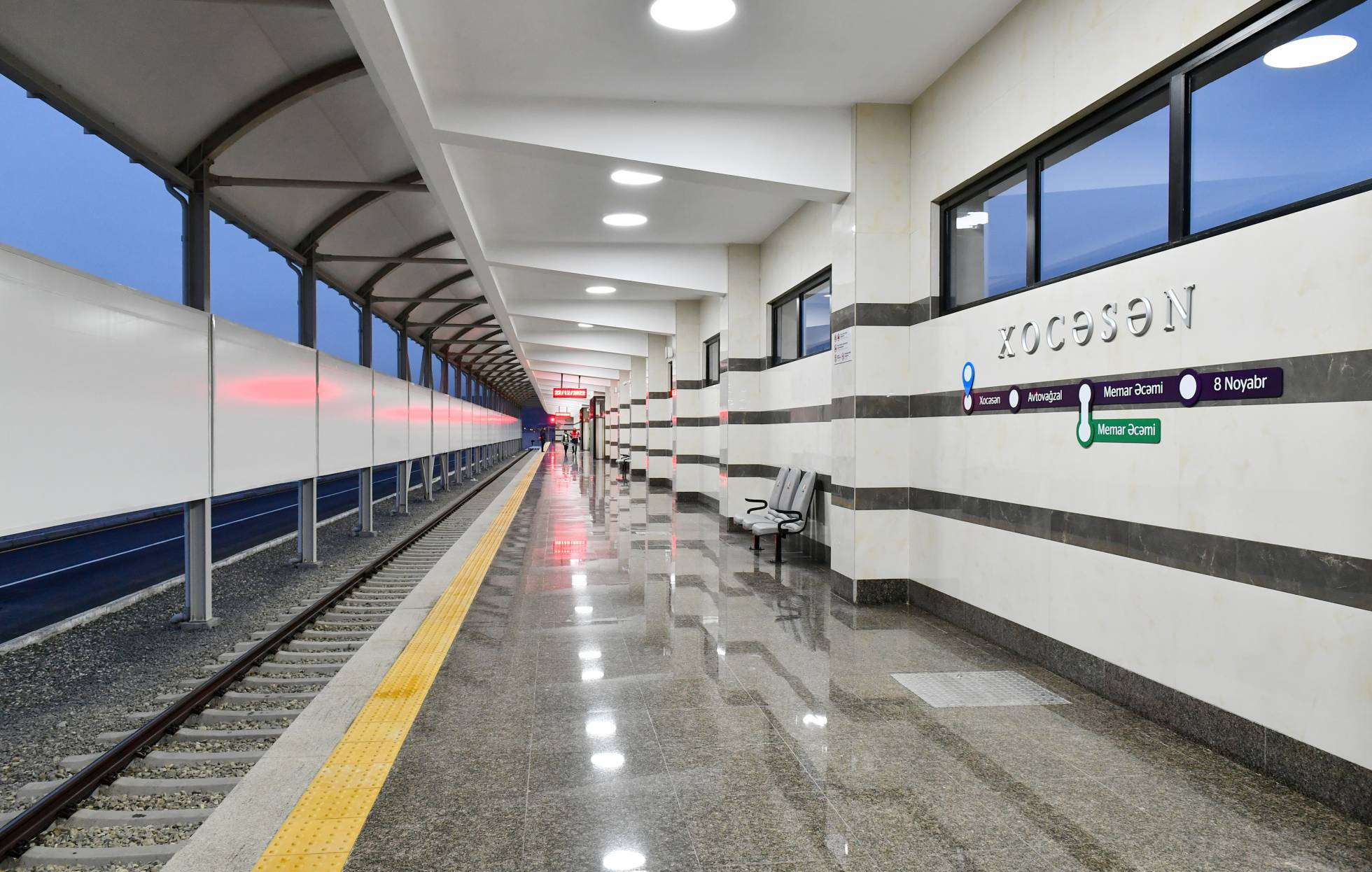
Interior of Khojasan Metro Station.

== See also ==
- List of Baku metro stations
- Khojasan
