= Darnagul (Baku Metro) =

Baku Metro station

Darnagul Dərnəgül
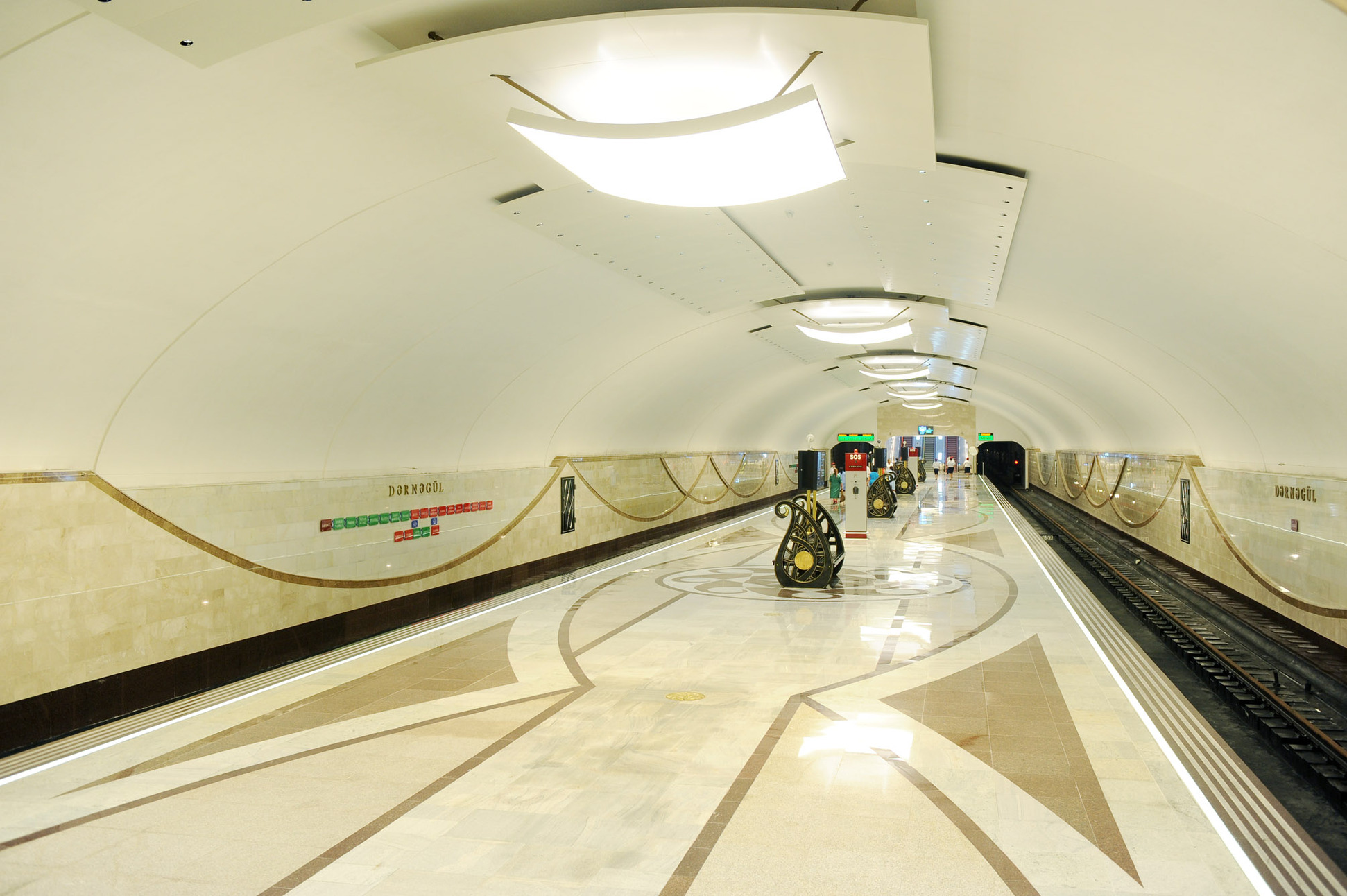

General information
- Location: Baku, Azerbaijan
- Coordinates: 40°25′02″N 49°51′01″E
- System: Baku Metro station
- Owner: Baku Metro
- Line: Green line
- Tracks: 1
- Connections: Bus station Darnagul railway station

History
- Opened: 29 June 2011

Services
Preceding station	Baku Metro	Following station
Terminus	Green line	Azadliq prospekti towards Hazi Aslanov or Bakmil
Location

Darnagul (Azerbaijani: Dərnəgül) is a Baku Metro station. It was opened on 29 June 2011. The station is located under Suleiman Sani Akhundov Street in the 7th microdistrict of Baku. It is the second single-line station in Baku. Initital construction began in 1989, but work ceased in 1993 after the dissolution of the Soviet Union. Work resumed in 2006.

== Connections ==
Connects to Transport Interchange Center. Connects as well as to Baku suburban railway

== Depot ==
The Depot for

Green line

after Darnagul Station.

== See also ==
- List of Baku metro stations
