= Bakmil =

Metro station in Azerbaijan

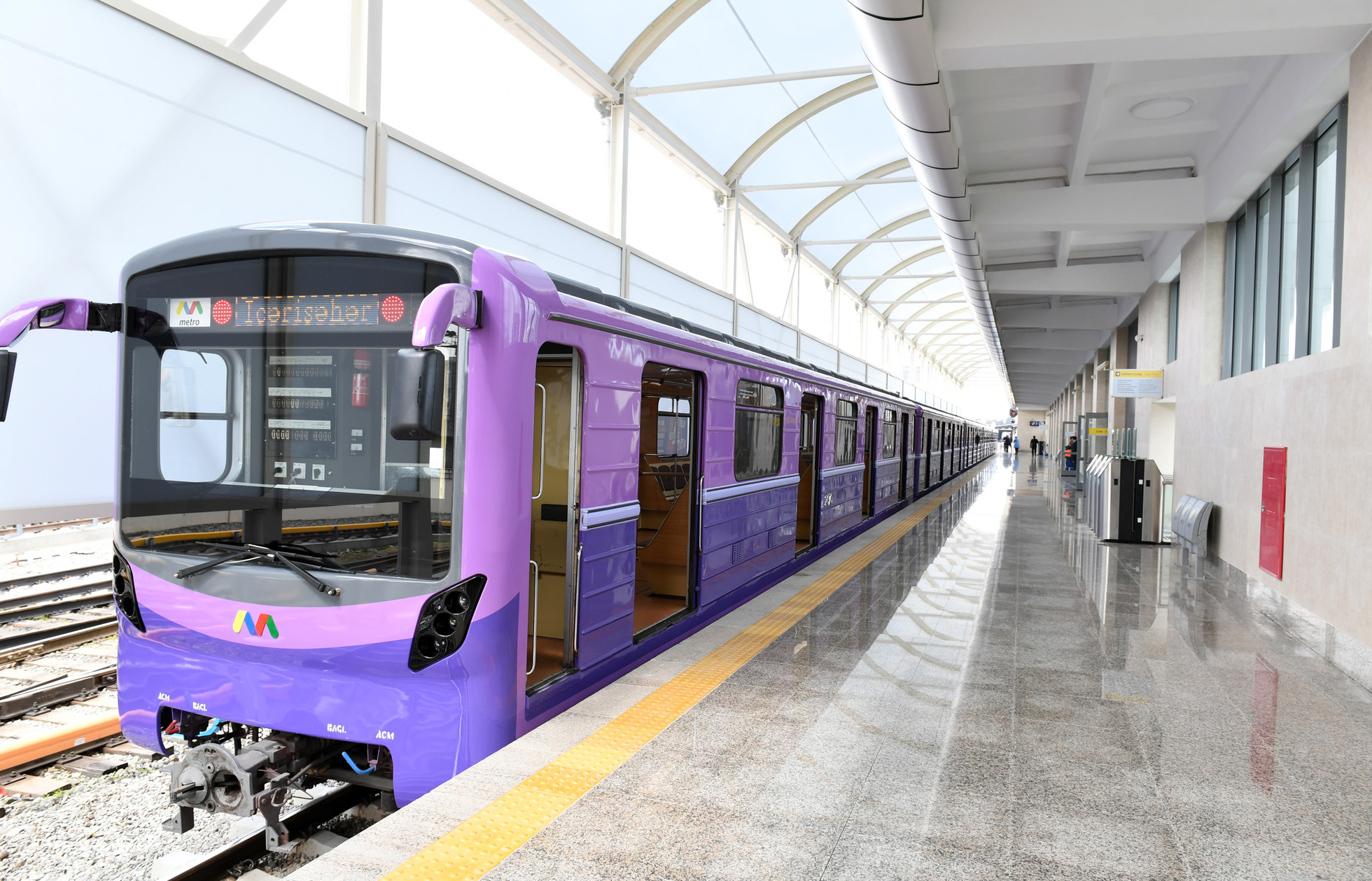
- Bakmil metro station (Train 81-717M/714M Type with new front-Modernized locally by Baku Metro LLC)

General information
- Location: Baku; Azerbaijan
- Coordinates: 40.3953°N 49.8822°E
- System: Baku Metro station
- Owner: Baku Metro
- Line: Red line
- Tracks: 2

History
- Opened: 28 March 1979

Services
Preceding station	Baku Metro	Following station
Nariman Narimanov towards Icheri Sheher	Red line	Terminus
Nariman Narimanov towards Darnagul	Green line	Terminus
Location

Bakmil is a Baku Metro station in Baku Region, Azerbaijan. It was opened on 28 March 1979 and completely refurbished in 2018, reopening on March 26, 2019. The station forms a single-stop branch line that splits off from Nariman Narimanov metro station. Until 1993 it was known as Elektrozavod or, in Russian pre-1991, as Electrozavodskaya.

Origin of the word "Bakmil" This word came from the name of the joint production enterprise of Baku and Milan.

Bakmil is located near the town hall of Azərİşıq BMKZ Yarımstansiyası and Bakı.

== Depot ==
There is Depot for

Red line

after Bakmil station.
