= Hazi Aslanov (Baku Metro) =

Baku Metro station

General information
- Location: Baku, Azerbaijan
- Coordinates: 40.22°N 49.5714°E
- System: Baku Metro station
- Owner: Baku Metro
- Line: Red line
- Connections: 11, 20, 43, 51, 57, 104 (future) Green line Tram

History
- Opened: 10 December 2002

Services
Preceding station	Baku Metro	Following station
Ahmedli towards Icheri Sheher	Red line	Terminus
Ahmedli towards Darnagul	Green line	Terminus
Location

Hazi Aslanov (Azerbaijani: Həzi Aslanov) is a Baku Metro station. It was opened on 10 December 2002 and named after Hazi Aslanov.

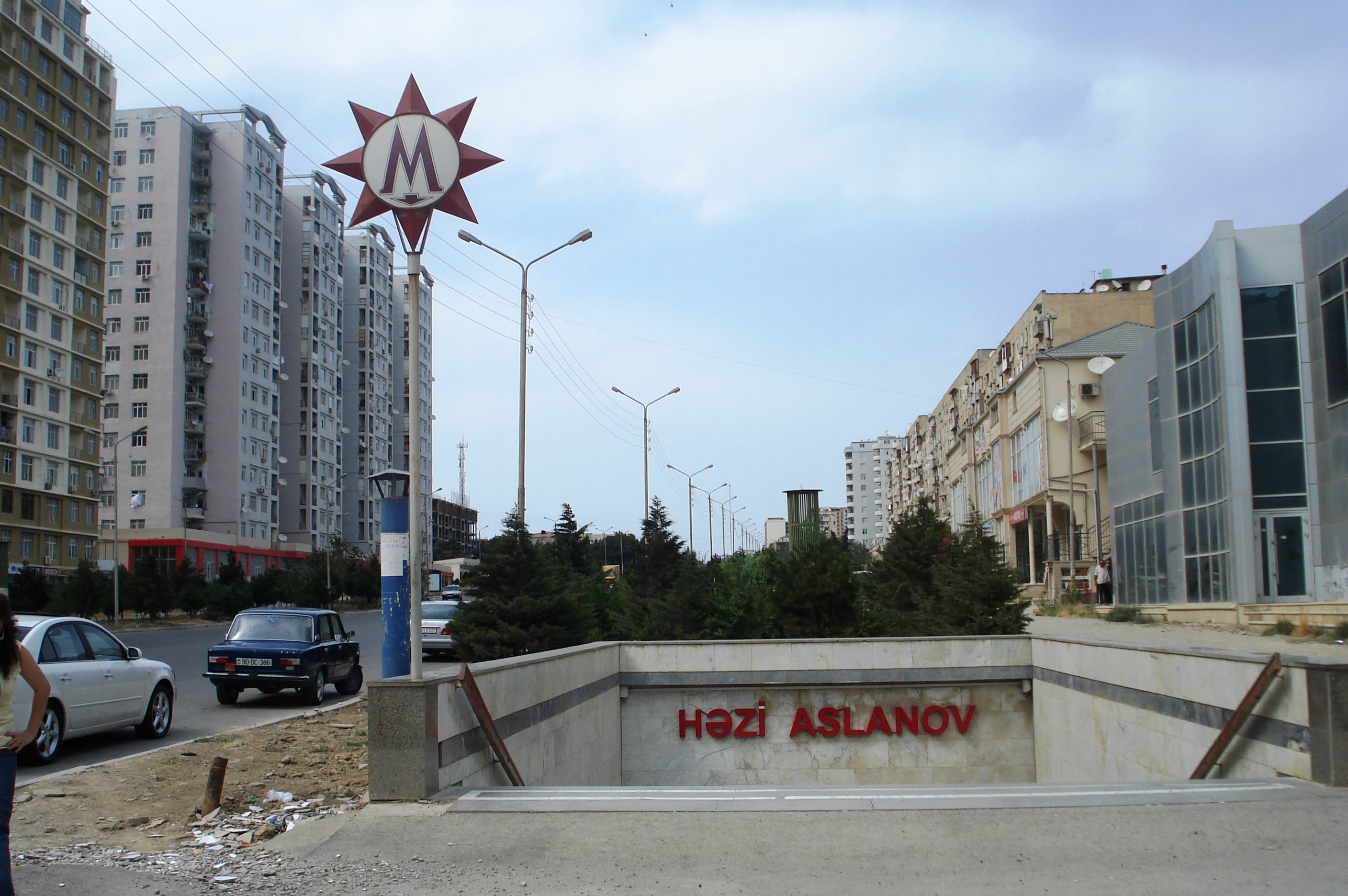
Hazi Aslanov Metro in 2009

== See also ==
- List of Baku metro stations
- Hazi Aslanov
