= Yasamal raion =

- Raion
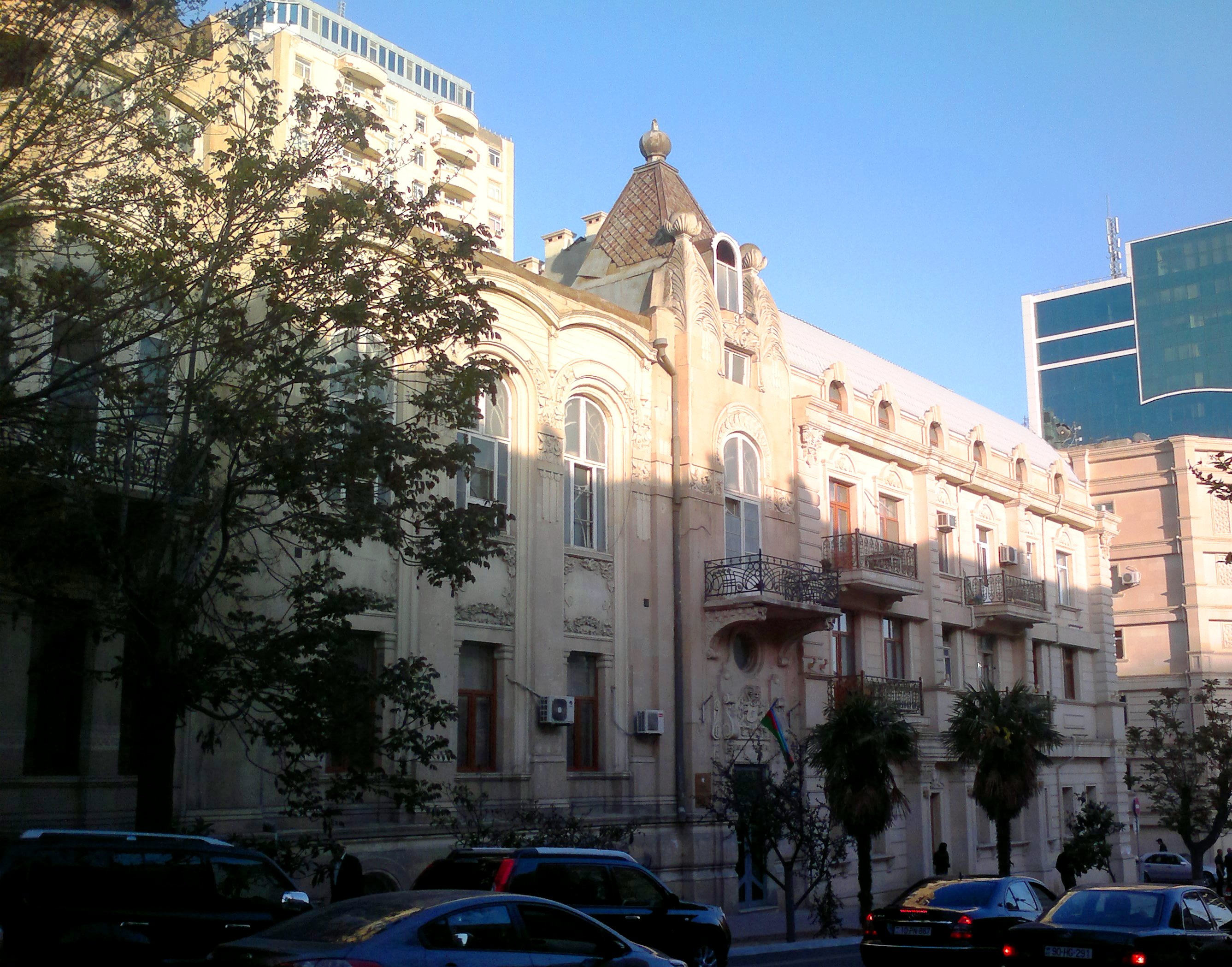
- Building of Yasamal Rayon Municipality on 12 Jafar Jabbarly Street
- Interactive map of Yasamal raion
- Country: Azerbaijan
- Region: Baku
- District: Baku

Area
  - Total: 16.22 km^{2} (6.26 sq mi)

Yasamal is a settlement and raion in Baku, Azerbaijan. As of 2023, it had a population of 249,300. It is one of the central districts of Baku.

== History ==
Yasamal district was established in 1932 as the administrative unit of the district, from the south to Sabail (3 km), west from Garadagh (3.2 km), north from Binagadi (2.8 km) and Nasimi (5 km) borders with regions.

== Geography ==
Through the district, from the "Kurt Gate" and Badamdar settlement to the south bypassing Baku-Gazakh and Baku-Astara and west of New Yasamal to Baku via Baku-Gazakh, Baku-Astara and Baku-Yalama, and from Bilajari, there are exits to Gazakh and Baku-Yalama highways.

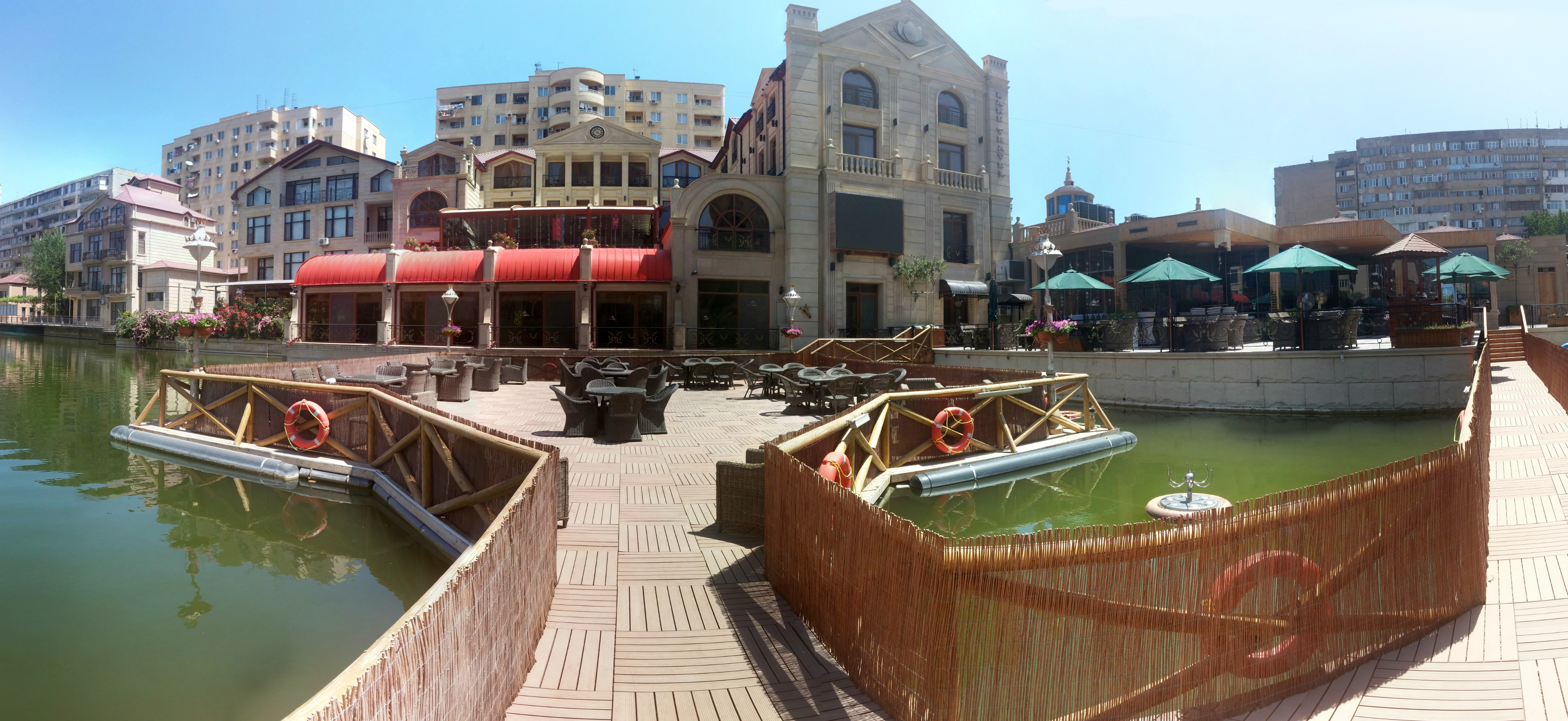
Lake Palace in Yasamal District

== History ==
5,497 families – 20,550 internally displaced persons have registered in the District Executive Authority.

== Demographics ==
The registered population density is 15,160 people/km_{2}. The population of the region is 118,776 people, with 48.5% males and 51.5% females.

== Education ==
Eight higher education institutions are present, along with 5 secondary specialized educational institutions, 4 music schools, 30 kindergartens, and 28 secondary schools (high school, gymnasium) where the number of teachers employed is 3,076 and the number of pupils is 29,643.

The Nizami, Academy of Sciences, Inshaatchilar.

== Transport ==
20 January subway stations are located in the district.

== Governance ==
The elected local self-governing body is Yasamal municipality. Pursuant to Article 210.1 of the Election Code of the Republic of Azerbaijan, members of municipalities are elected in multi-member constituencies on the basis of a relative majority system.

== Economy ==
Yasamal is located in a central district of Baku. 9,153 different categories of economic objects operate in the district, with 100,382 workers and servants. The average monthly salary in these enterprises was 622.7 AZN.

The macroeconomic indicators of Yasamal district in 2017 were:

- Industrial output is 353.421 million AZN.
- Investments in fixed assets amounted to 299.604 million AZN.
- Construction and installation works out of the total investment in fixed assets amounted to 240.059 million AZN.
- Contract work was 603.872 million AZN.
- Transport services amounted to 2432.532 million AZN.
- Information and communication services were 659.695 million AZN.
- Retail trade turnover was 2665.674 million AZN.
- Paid services provided to the population amounted to 1235.517 million AZN.
- Average monthly salary is 655.1 AZN.

As of January 1, 2018, the total number capacity of Yasamal Telephone Junction was 179,832, among which 152,888 numbers were in use.
