= Neftçi Arena =

Stadium in Baku, Azerbaijan

8th Kilometer Stadium
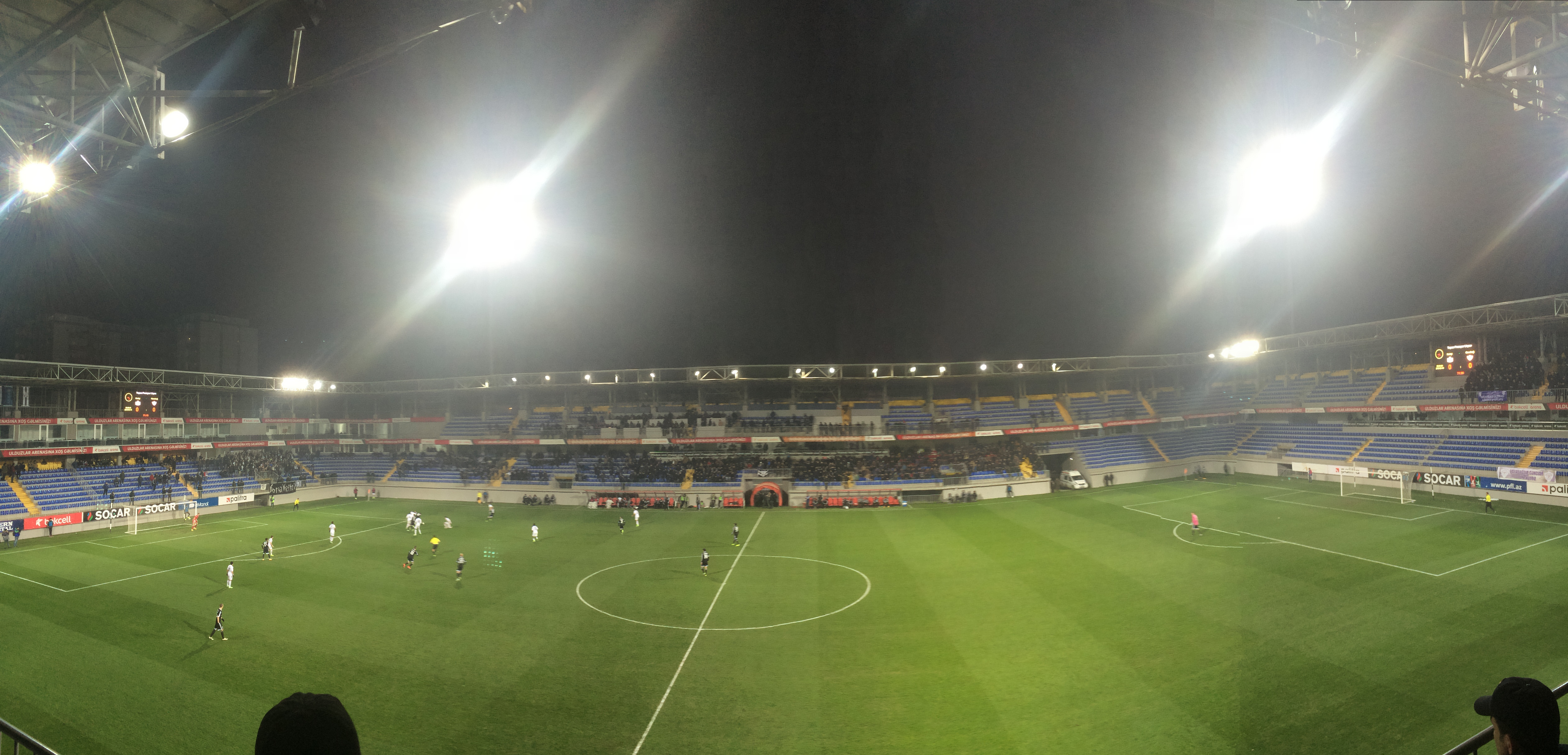
- Interior view of the stadium
- Interactive map of 8th Kilometer Stadium
- Former names: 8th Kilometer Stadium (2012–2013); Bakcell Arena (2013–2023); Neftçi Arena (2023-2025); Palms Sports Arena (2025-present)
- Location: 8th Kilometer, Nizami raion, Baku, Azerbaijan
- Coordinates: 40.4002°N 49.9440°E
- Owner: Neftçi PFK
- Capacity: 11,000
- Surface: Natural grass
- Record attendance: 11,000 (Gabala vs Panathinaikos 1–2, 3 August 2017); 11,000 (Neftçi vs Beşiktaş 1–3, 10 August 2023)
- Public transit: Neftchilar; Khalglar Dostlughu

Construction
- Groundbreaking: April 30, 2010
- Built: April 2010 – August 2012
- Opened: 14 September 2012

Tenants
- Neftçi; Azerbaijan national football team (occasional)

Neftçi Arena, formerly known as Bakcell Arena, is a football-specific stadium located in the 8th Kilometer district of Nizami raion, Baku, Azerbaijan. The stadium has a capacity of 10,289 spectators and serves as the home ground of Azerbaijan Premier League club Neftçi PFK. It also serves as an occasional venue for the Azerbaijan national football team. The stadium was nominated for StadiumDB's Stadium of the Year award in 2012.

== Construction and opening ==
Construction began on 30 April 2010 in the 8th Kilometer district, a residential area east of Baku's old town, from which the stadium took its original name, 8 km Stadionu. The stadium was built on a compact plot situated between two local schools, which constrained the overall footprint of the venue. Despite its modest size, the stadium includes 17 skyboxes occupying much of the upper tier, 200 dedicated press seats, and 300 parking bays. Construction was completed in August 2012, and the stadium was officially opened on 14 September 2012 by President Ilham Aliyev, one week before it hosted its first international tournament.

== Naming history ==
The stadium originally opened as 8 km Stadionu (8th Kilometer Stadium). In January 2013, it was renamed Bakcell Arena under a sponsorship agreement with Bakcell, an Azerbaijani mobile telephone operator. The Bakcell sponsorship ran for a decade, and when it concluded in August 2023, the stadium reverted to Neftçi Arena. In 2025, a new naming-rights agreement was reached with Palms Sports, and the stadium became known as Palms Sports Arena.

== Events ==
Shortly after its opening, the stadium served as a venue for the 2012 FIFA U-17 Women's World Cup, hosted by Azerbaijan from 22 September to 13 October 2012, including quarter-final and semi-final matches.

Neftçi PFK has played all of its home Azerbaijan Premier League and Azerbaijan Cup matches at the stadium since the 2012–13 season. The Azerbaijan national football team has also used the venue as an alternative home ground for World Cup qualifiers and friendlies after the stadium met UEFA stadium criteria.

The stadium has twice reached its full capacity of 11,000. The first occasion was a UEFA Europa League third qualifying round match between Gabala and Panathinaikos on 3 August 2017, which Panathinaikos won 2–1. The second was a UEFA Europa Conference League third qualifying round match between Neftçi and Beşiktaş on 10 August 2023, which Beşiktaş won 3–1.

== Azerbaijan national football team matches ==
The following national team matches were held in the stadium.

Date	Time (CEST)	Team #1	Res.	Team #2	Round	Attendance
7 June 2013	21:00	Azerbaijan	1–1	Luxembourg	2014 FIFA World Cup qualifying	9,258
11 October 2013	21:00	Azerbaijan	2–0	Northern Ireland	2014 FIFA World Cup qualifying	10,100
15 October 2013	22:00	Azerbaijan	1–1	Russia	2014 FIFA World Cup qualifying	11,000
9 September 2014	18:00	Azerbaijan	1–2	Bulgaria	UEFA Euro 2016 qualifying	11,000
16 November 2014	18:00	Azerbaijan	0–1	Norway	UEFA Euro 2016 qualifying	9,200
3 September 2014	18:00	Azerbaijan	0–0	Croatia	UEFA Euro 2016 qualifying	10,000
4 September 2017	18:00	Azerbaijan	5–1	San Marino	2018 FIFA World Cup qualifying	8,000
8 June 2019	18:00	Azerbaijan	1–3	Hungary	UEFA Euro 2020 qualifying	10,450
11 June 2019	18:00	Azerbaijan	1–5	Slovakia	UEFA Euro 2020 qualifying	8,200
9 September 2019	18:00	Azerbaijan	1–1	Croatia	UEFA Euro 2020 qualifying	9,150
16 November 2019	18:00	Azerbaijan	0–2	Wales	UEFA Euro 2020 qualifying	8,622
13 November 2025	18:00	Azerbaijan	0–2	Iceland	2026 FIFA World Cup qualifying	4,300

== See also ==
- List of football stadiums in Azerbaijan
