= Azerbaijan–Bosnia and Herzegovina relations =

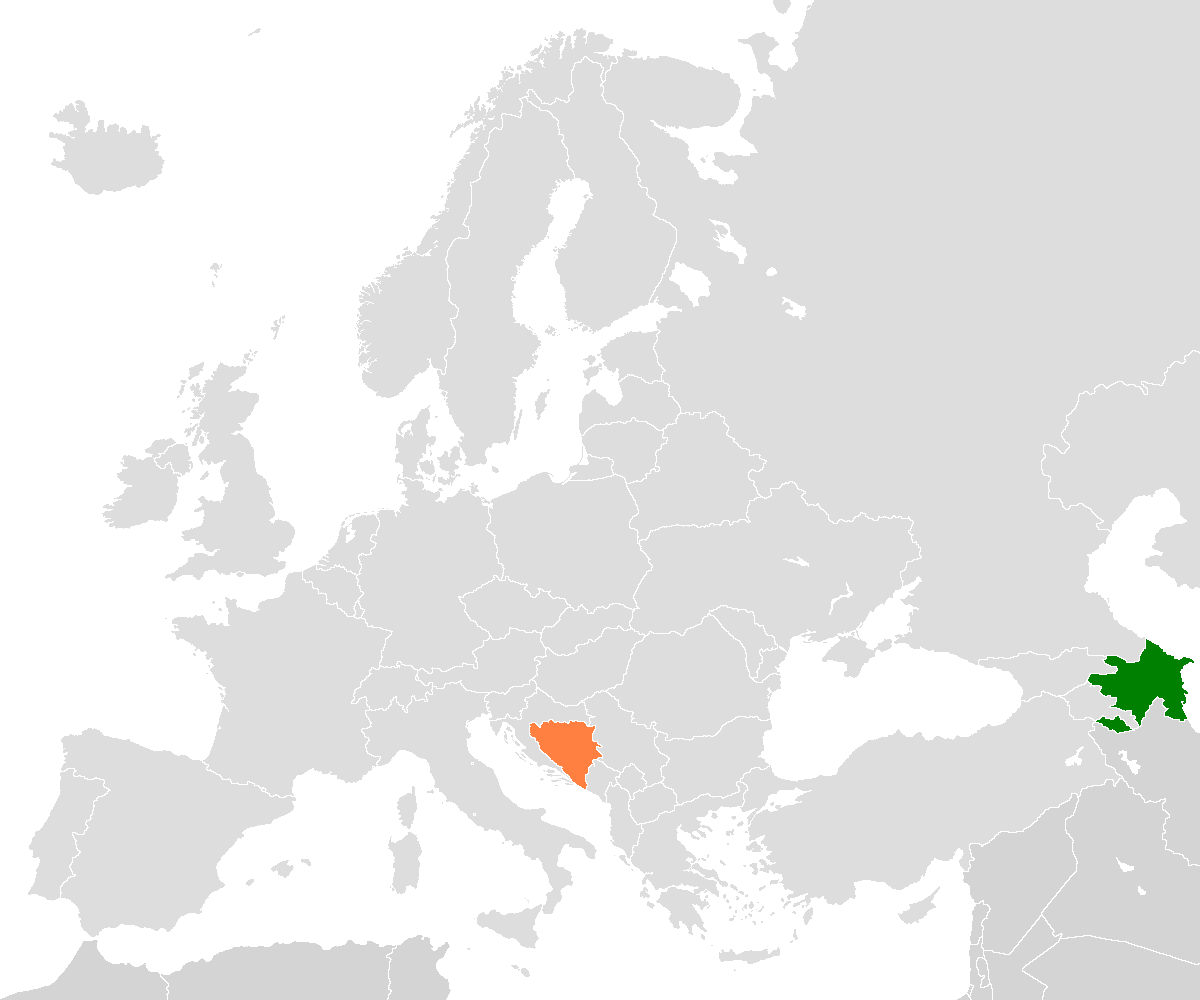

- Azerbaijan: Bosnia and Herzegovina

The Azerbaijan–Bosnia and Herzegovina relations refer to the bilateral relations between Azerbaijan and Bosnia and Herzegovina. Azerbaijan has a diplomatic office in Sarajevo. Bosnia and Herzegovina has a non-resident ambassador in Ankara, Turkey, accredited to Azerbaijan.

Cooperation is carried out in such areas as economy, education, culture, healthcare, investment, energy, tourism, telecommunications, infrastructure, pharmaceuticals, etc.

== Diplomatic relations ==
The leader of diplomatic mission is Ismayil Jafarov.

The representative of Bosnia and Herzegovina in Azerbaijan is Bakir Sadovich.

Friendship groups operate in the legislative bodies of both countries

In 2012, the "Convention on the abolition of double taxation of profits and property and the suppression of tax evasion between the government of Azerbaijan and the Council of Ministers of Bosnia and Herzegovina" was signed

== Economic cooperation ==
A joint Azerbaijani-Bosnian business forum was held in Banja Luka in February 2013. The forum was attended by entrepreneurs working in such areas as the oil industry, banking, agriculture, construction, industry, tourism, etc.

In November 2017, the Azerbaijan–Bosnia and Herzegovina business meeting was held with the financial support of the Ministry of Economy of Azerbaijan and the Azerbaijan Export and Investment Promotion Fund (AZPROMO). The meeting was attended by more than 60 entrepreneurs working in such areas as agriculture, food industry, finance, industry, ICT, construction, textile industry, and services.

In 2017, the Foreign Trade chamber of Bosnia and Herzegovina and the Azerbaijan Export and Investment Promotion Fund (AZPROMO) signed a Memorandum of understanding.

In April 2019, the implementation of the Interconnector project on creating a pipeline infrastructure for the transportation of Azerbaijani gas (Shah Deniz-2) to Europe began in Bosnia and Herzegovina

== Tourism ==
In December 2014, the Council of Ministers of Bosnia and Herzegovina abolished the visa regime for Azerbaijani citizens Earlier, in 2012, the Government of Azerbaijan and the Council of Ministers of Bosnia and Herzegovina signed an agreement on the abolition of visas for persons holding diplomatic and service passports

== Humanitarian assistance ==
In September 2018, the opening ceremony of the emergency medical care center was held in the Bosnian city of Kotor Varoš with the financial support of the Heydar Aliyev Foundation.

On 23 April 2020, during the COVID-19 pandemic, humanitarian aid was sent from Azerbaijan to Sarajevo.

In May 2020, Azerbaijan sent financial assistance to the Ministry of Security of Bosnia and Herzegovina in the amount of 538,910 in the fight against the COVID-19 pandemic.

== International cooperation ==
In the international arena, cooperation between countries is carried out within the framework of various international organizations

The government of Bosnia and Herzegovina supports Azerbaijan in the Nagorno-Karabakh conflict.

== Cultural ties ==
In the early 1970s, Baku and Sarajevo were declared twin cities.

In December 2018, an Azerbaijani delegation led by the Union of Municipalities of the Turkic World (TDBB) paid an official visit to Bosnia and Herzegovina. During this visit, the parties signed the "Project for the renovation of the Potokari memorial complex", according to which TDBB collaborated with the administration of the Srebrenica Potokari memorial complex. Then it was decided to reach an agreement between the municipality of Yasamal and the municipality of Novi Grad as twin cities.

The Bosnia and Herzegovina-Azerbaijan Friendship Association operates in Azerbaijan

In 2012, the "Agreement on cooperation in the field of education between the Ministry of education of Azerbaijan and the Ministry of Civil Affairs of Herzegovina and Bosnia" was signed.

== Resident diplomatic missions ==
- Azerbaijan has an embassy in Sarajevo.
- Bosnia and Herzegovina is accredited to Azerbaijan from its embassy in Ankara, Turkey.
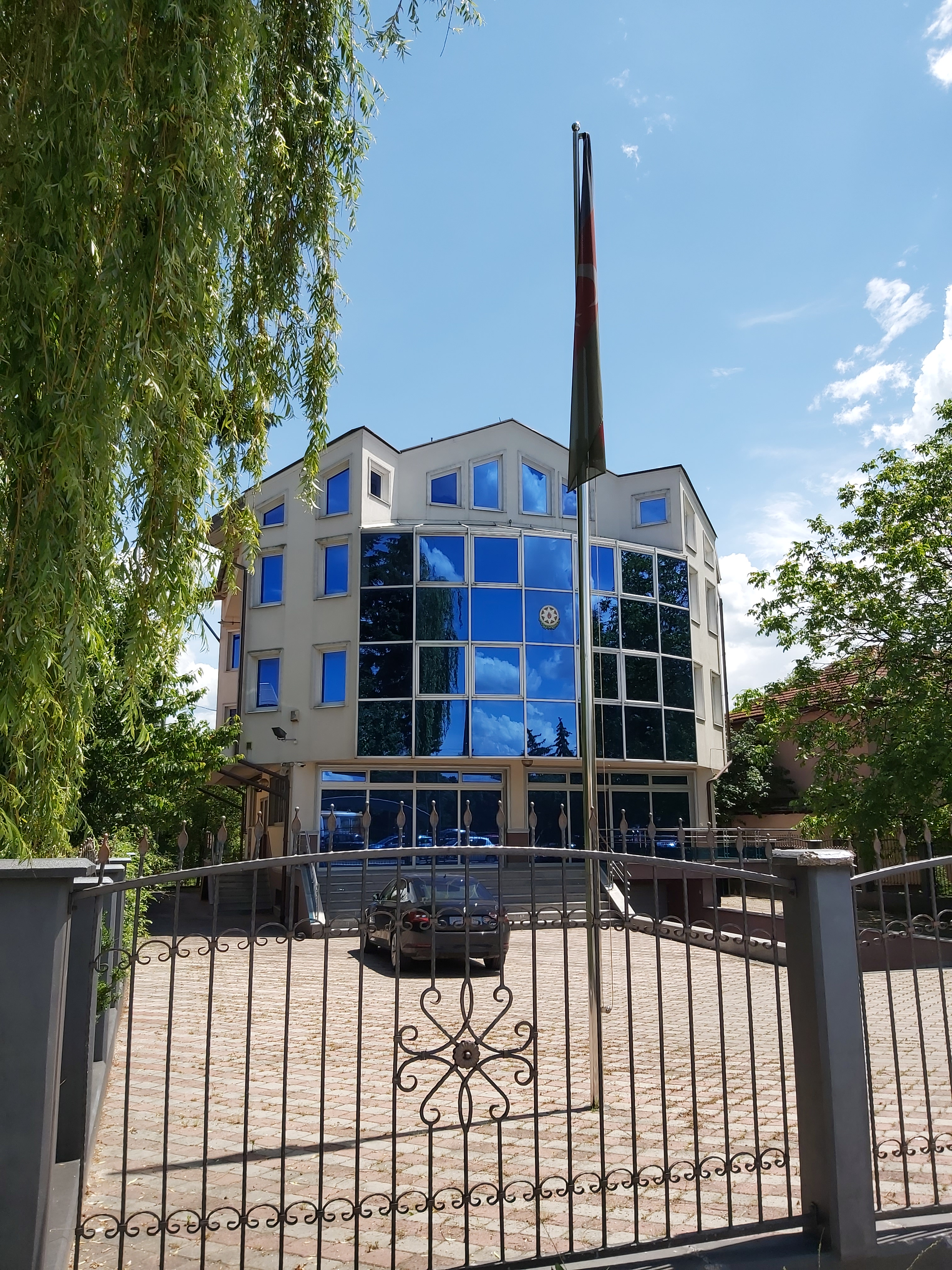
Embassy of Azerbaijan in Sarajevo

== See also ==
- Foreign relations of Azerbaijan
- Foreign relations of Bosnia and Herzegovina
