= Ahmedli (Baku Metro) =

Baku Metro station in Baku, Azerbaijan

Ahmedli Azerbaijani: Əhmədli

General information
- Location: Baku, Azerbaijan
- Coordinates: 40.23°N 49.5715°E
- System: Baku Metro station
- Owner: Baku Metro
- Line: Red line
- Tracks: 2
- Connections: 7A, 11, 12, 21, 35, 42, 44, 46, 51, 57, 60, 62, 121E, 132, 183

History
- Opened: 28 April 1989

Services
Preceding station	Baku Metro	Following station
Halglar Doslugu towards Icheri Sheher	Red line	Hazi Aslanov Terminus
Halglar Doslugu towards Darnagul	Green line	Hazi Aslanov Terminus
Location

Ahmedli (Azerbaijani: Əhmədli) is a Baku Metro station. It was opened on 28 April 1989.

The length of the station is 3.1 km. For 23 years until 2002, until the Azi Aslanov station was opened, it was the terminus of the red line of the metro.

The construction was supervised by the architects L. Kochubey and L. Avramenko.

== See also ==
- List of Baku metro stations
- Ahmedli
