= Mammadagha Mammadov =

Azerbaijani-Soviet chemist, technologist and statesman (1926–1971)

Mammadagha Mammadov Məmmədağa Məmmədov

Minister of Oil Refining and Petrochemical Industry of the Azerbaijan SSR
- In office April 17, 1967 – January 23, 1971
- Succeeded by: Kamil Hekimov

First Deputy Minister of Oil Refining and Petrochemical Industry of the Azerbaijan SSR
- In office 1965–1967

Personal details
- Born: May 30, 1926 Baku, Azerbaijan SSR, USSR
- Died: January 23, 1971 (aged 44) Baku, Azerbaijan SSR, USSR
- Resting place: Alley of Honor
- Party: CPSU
- Education: M. Azizbeyov Azerbaijan Institute of Oil and Chemistry
- Awards: Honored Engineer of the Azerbaijan SSR Honored Inventor of the Azerbaijan SSR Order of Lenin Order of the Badge of Honour

Mammadagha Ahmad oghlu Mammadov (Azerbaijani: Məmmədağa Əhməd oğlu Məmmədov, May 30, 1926 — January 23, 1971) was an Azerbaijani-Soviet chemist, technologist and statesman, Minister of Oil Refining and Petrochemical Industry of the Azerbaijan SSR.

== Biography ==
M. Mammadov was born on May 30, 1926, in Baku. After graduating from high school in 1943, he entered the technology faculty of the M. Azizbeyov Azerbaijan Institute of Oil and Chemistry, and also worked in the field of production. After graduating in 1949, he was sent to work as an operator at the XXII Congress of the CPSU Baku Refinery, where he was promoted to chief of the plant, and later promoted to party secretary of the Central Committee of the CPSU.

In 1955–1959, Mammadaga Mammadov was the deputy head of the oil industry department of the Central Committee of the Azerbaijan Communist Party, in 1959–1961, the chief engineer and deputy chief of the Union of Oil Plants of the National Economic Council of the Azerbaijan SSR, and in 1961-1965 he was the head of the Oil Refining and Chemical Industry Department of the Azerbaijan SSR, in 1965-1967 he was the First Deputy Minister of Oil Refining and Petrochemical Industry of the Azerbaijan SSR, and in 1967-1971, he was the Minister of Oil Refining and Petrochemical Industry of the Azerbaijan SSR.

Mammadaga Mammadov worked on the development of additives technology for lubricants and the organization of production, and was the author of a number of scientific works in this field. He was an associate professor of the M. Azizbeyov Azerbaijan Institute of Oil and Chemistry, and in 1967 he received the degree of candidate of technical sciences.

Mammadaga Mammadov, a member of the CPSU since 1946, was repeatedly elected a member of the Baku city and Shaumyan district party committees and a deputy of the Baku Soviet. He died on January 23, 1971, in Baku.

== Awards ==
- Honored Engineer of the Azerbaijan SSR — 1964
- Honored Inventor of the Azerbaijan SSR — May 24, 1960
- Stalin Prize (3rd degree) — 1951
- Order of Lenin
- Order of the Badge of Honour
