= Gara Garayev (Baku Metro) =

Baku Metro station

Coordinates: 40.3953°N 49.8822°E

Gara Garayev Qara Qarayev

General information
- Location: Baku, Azerbaijan
- System: Baku Metro station
- Owner: Baku Metro
- Line: Red line
- Tracks: 2
- Connections: 1, 7A, 11, 12, 15, 36, 44, 54, 62, 70, 78, 106, 166, 214, E1 (future); Blue Line

History
- Opened: 6 November 1972

Services
Preceding station	Baku Metro	Following station
Koroğlu towards Icheri Sheher	Red line	Neftchilar towards Hazi Aslanov
Koroğlu towards Darnagul	Green line	Neftchilar towards Hazi Aslanov
Location

Gara Garayev (Azerbaijani: Qara Qarayev) is a Baku Metro station. It was opened on 6 November 1972. It was previously called Avrora during the Soviet Era and is now named after Gara Garayev.

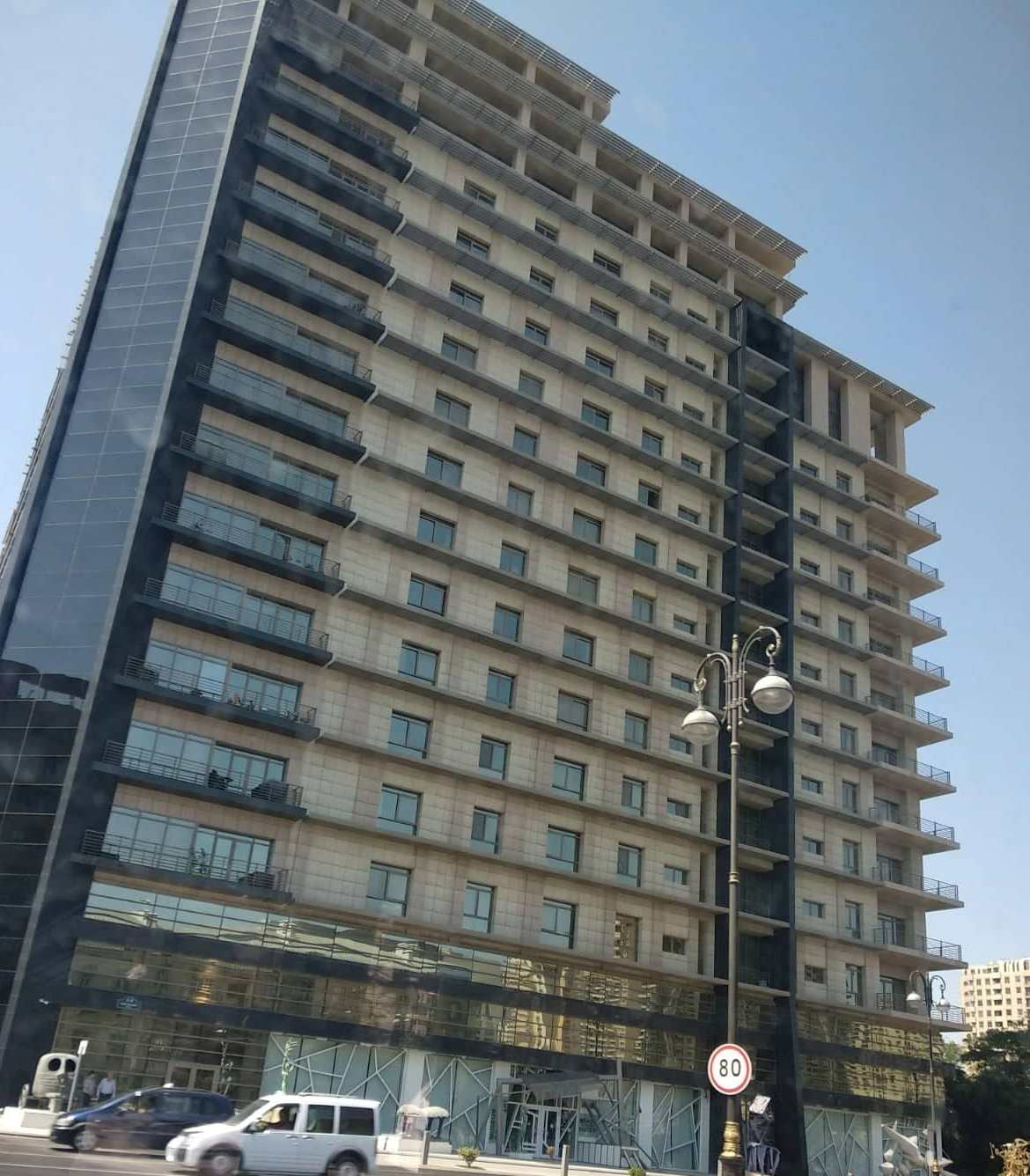
Gara Garayev Avenue

== See also ==
- List of Baku metro stations
- Gara Garayev
