= Sabail raion =

Raion of Baku

Sabail Səbail
- Rayon
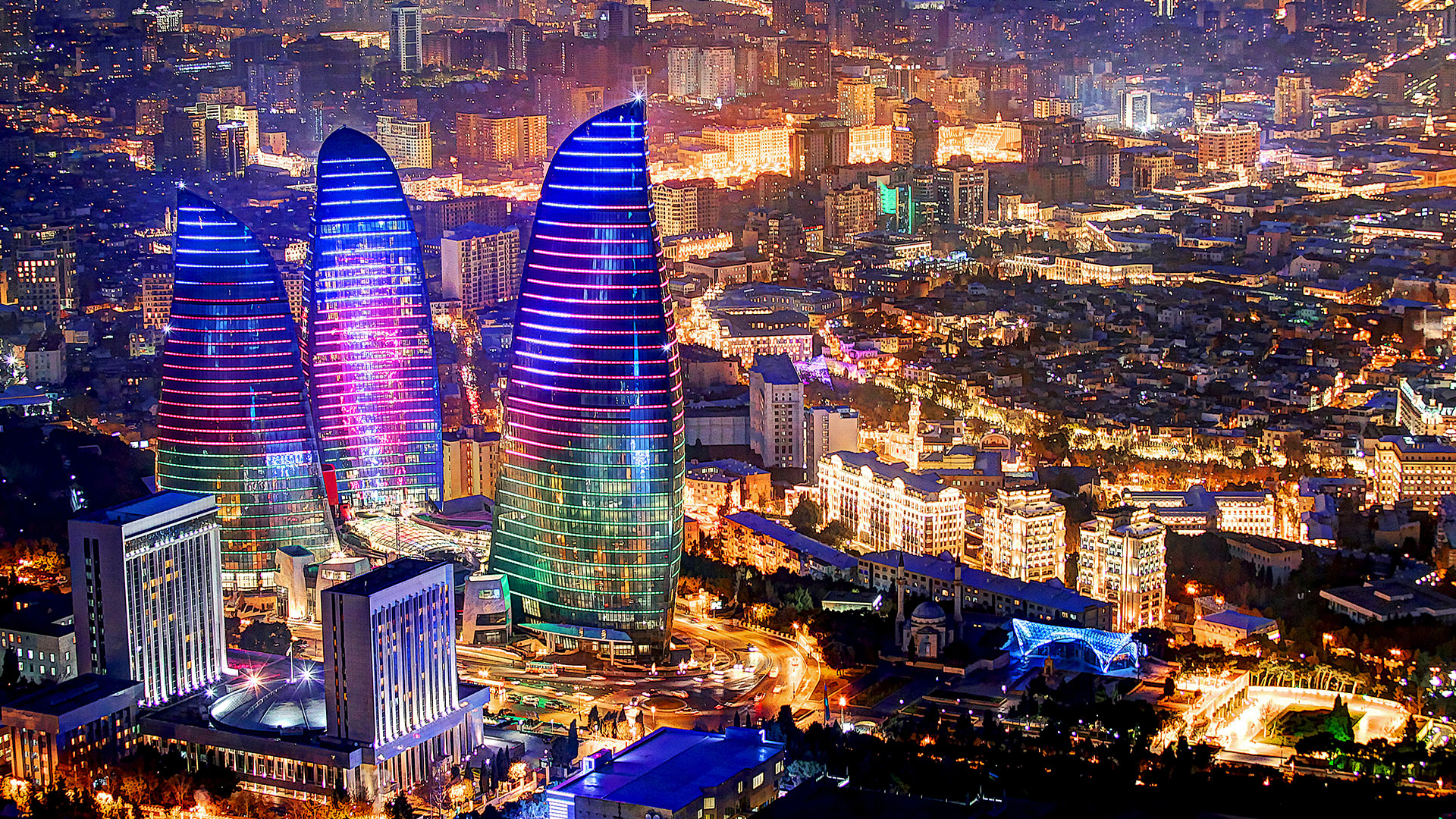
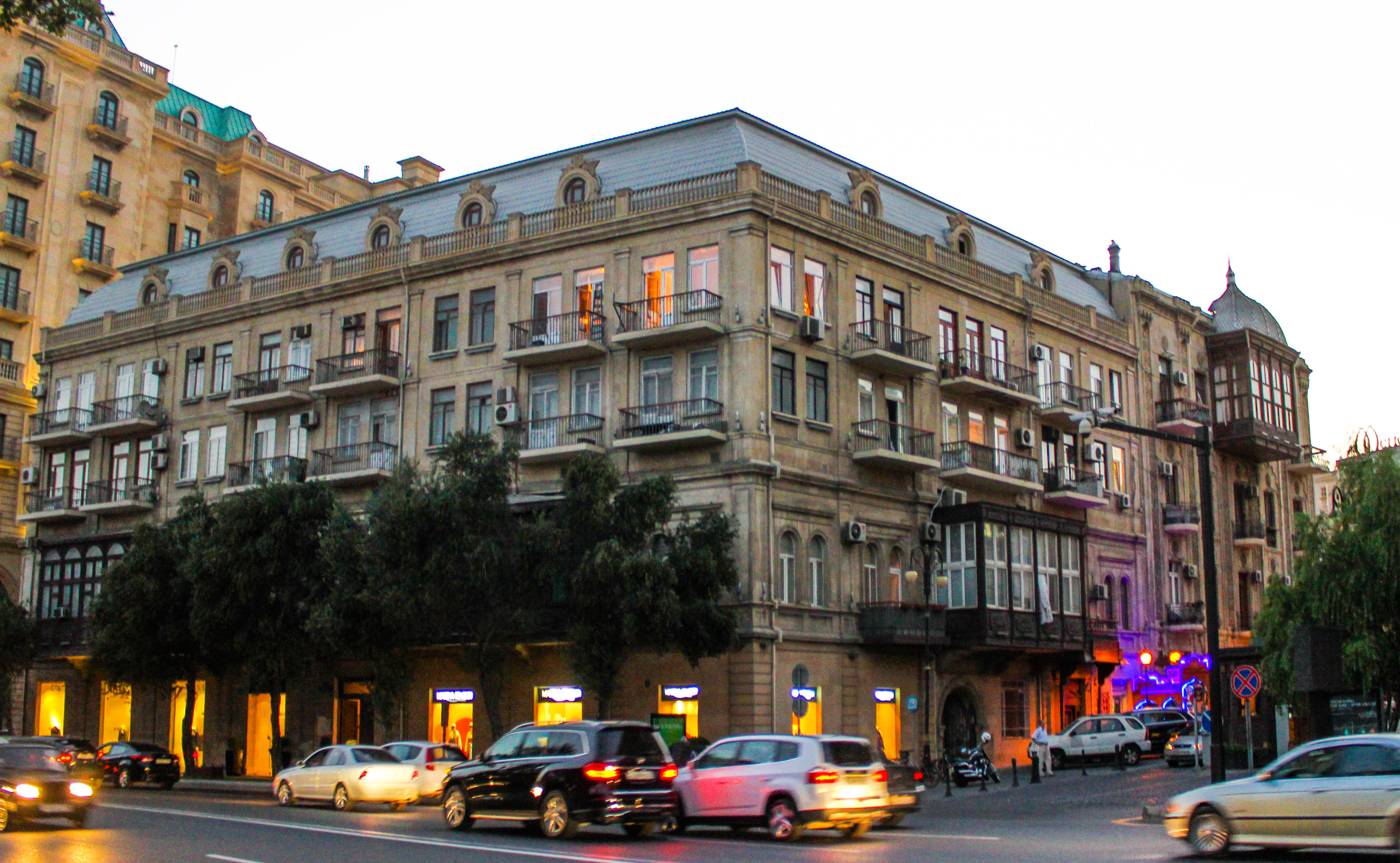
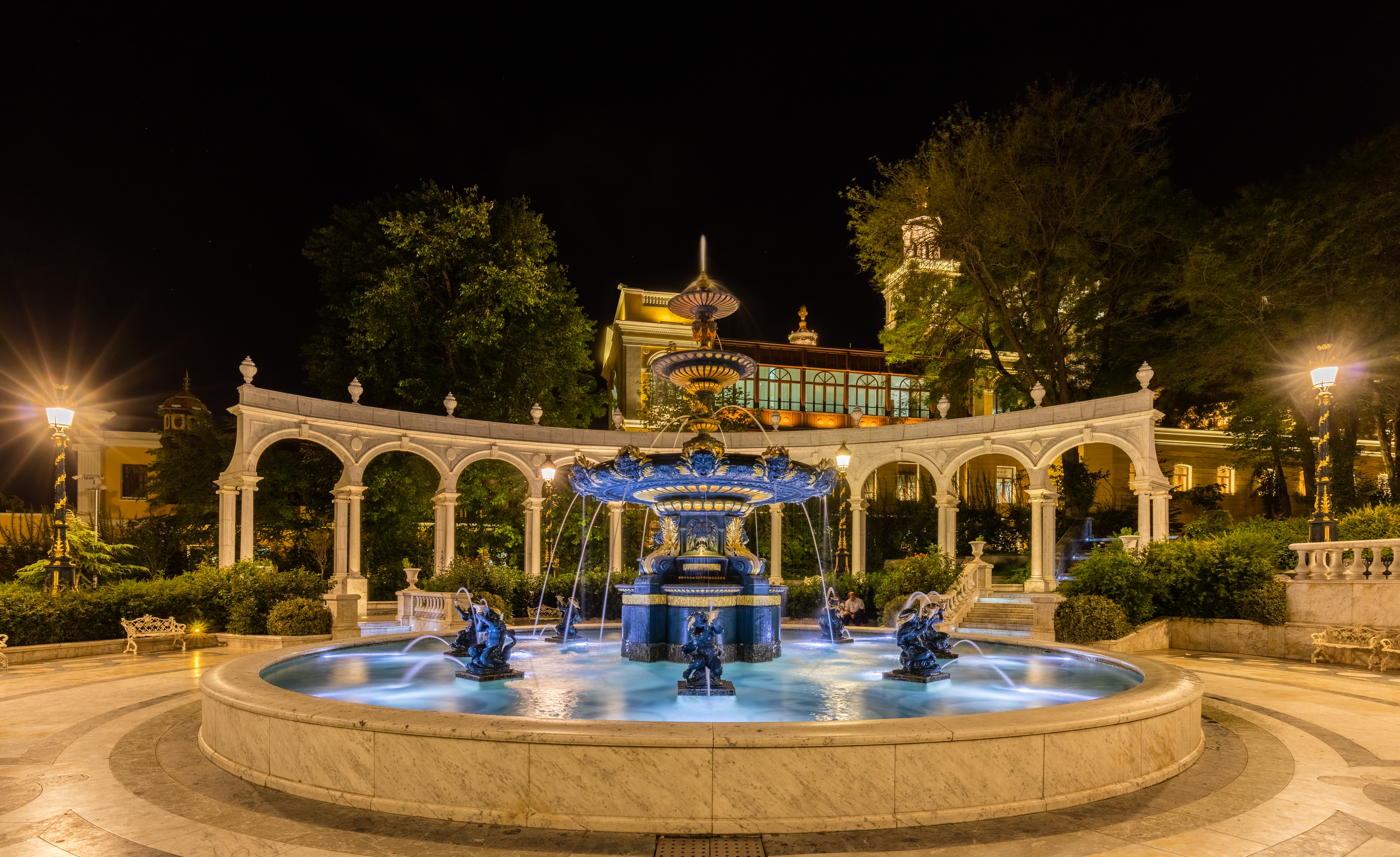
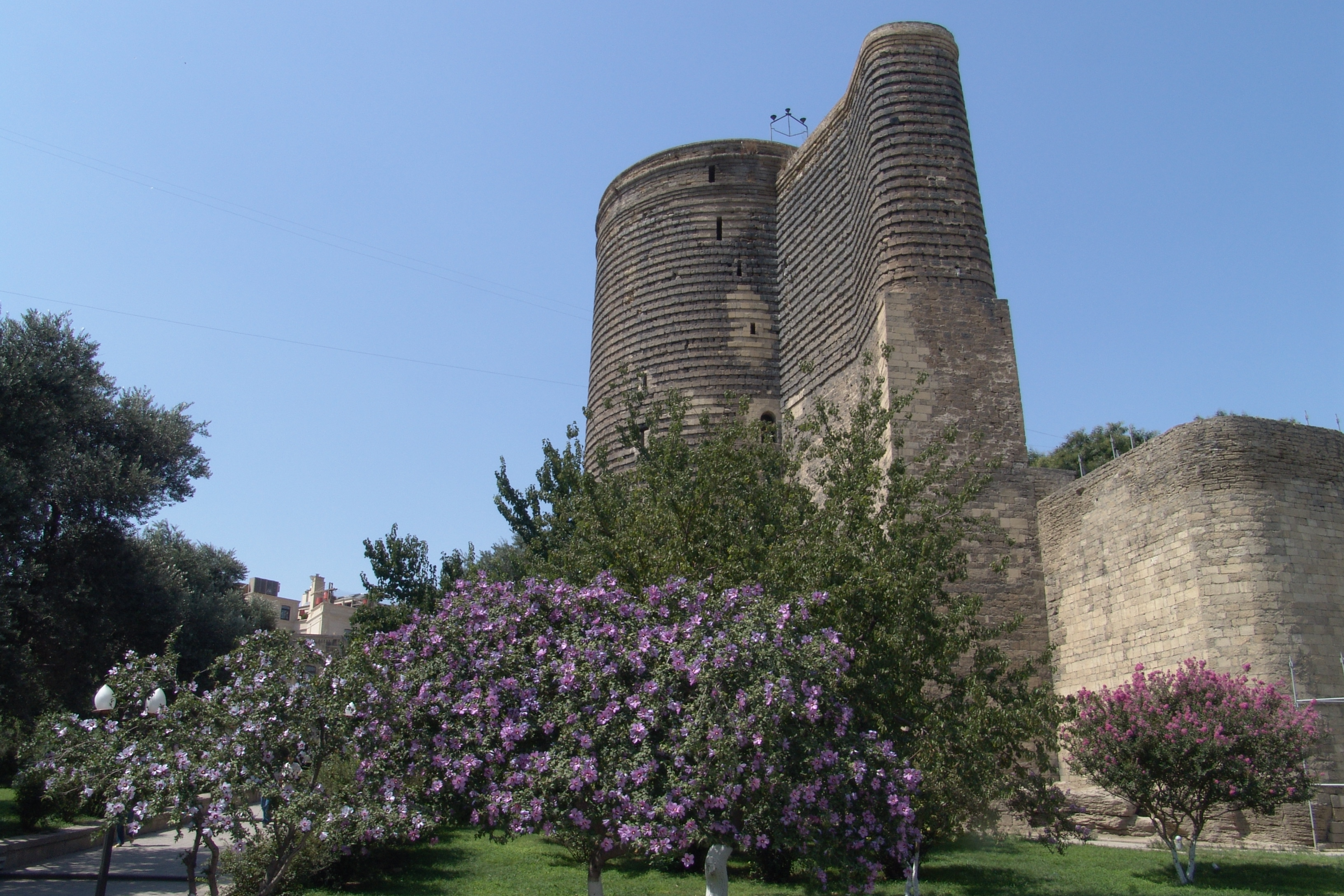
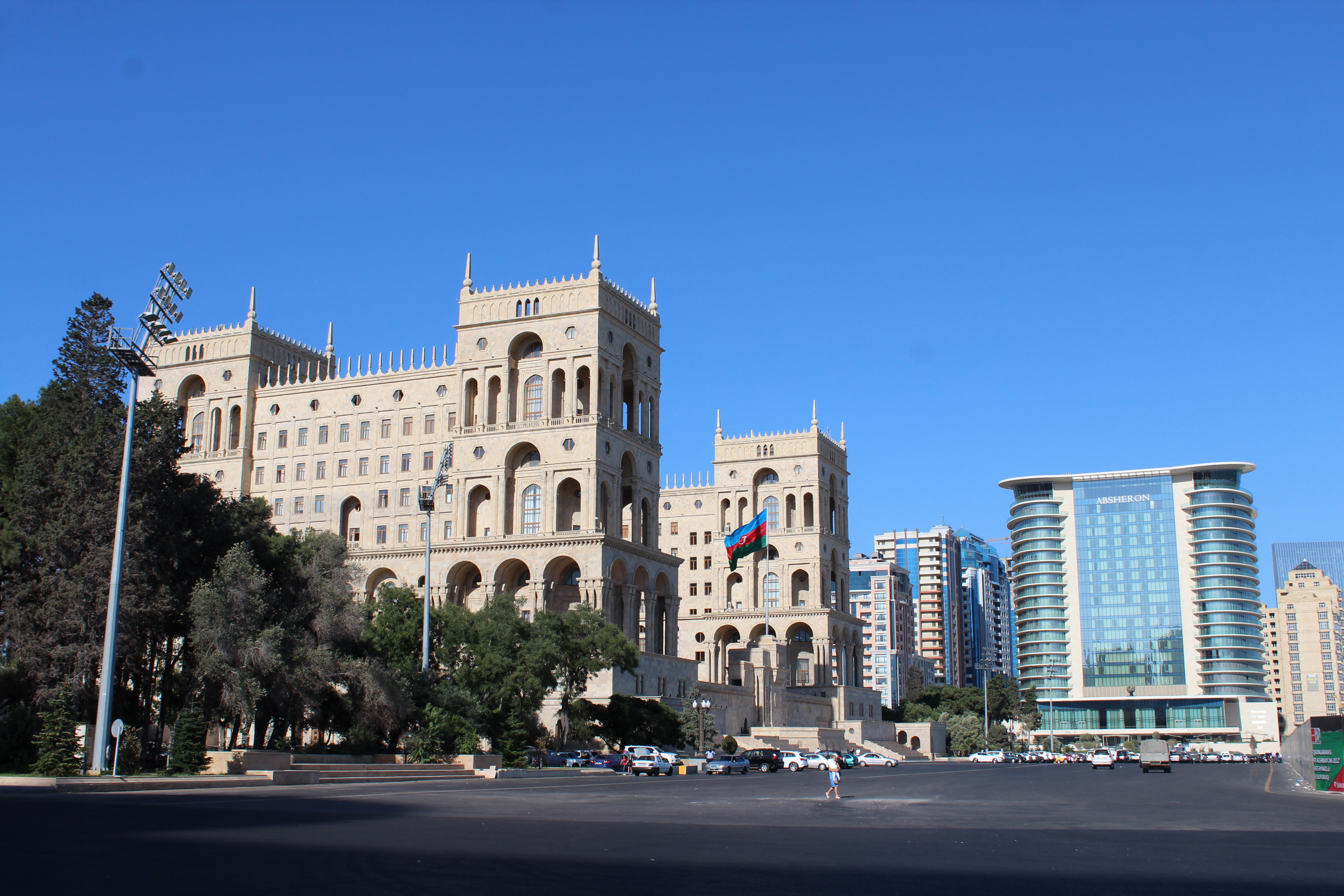
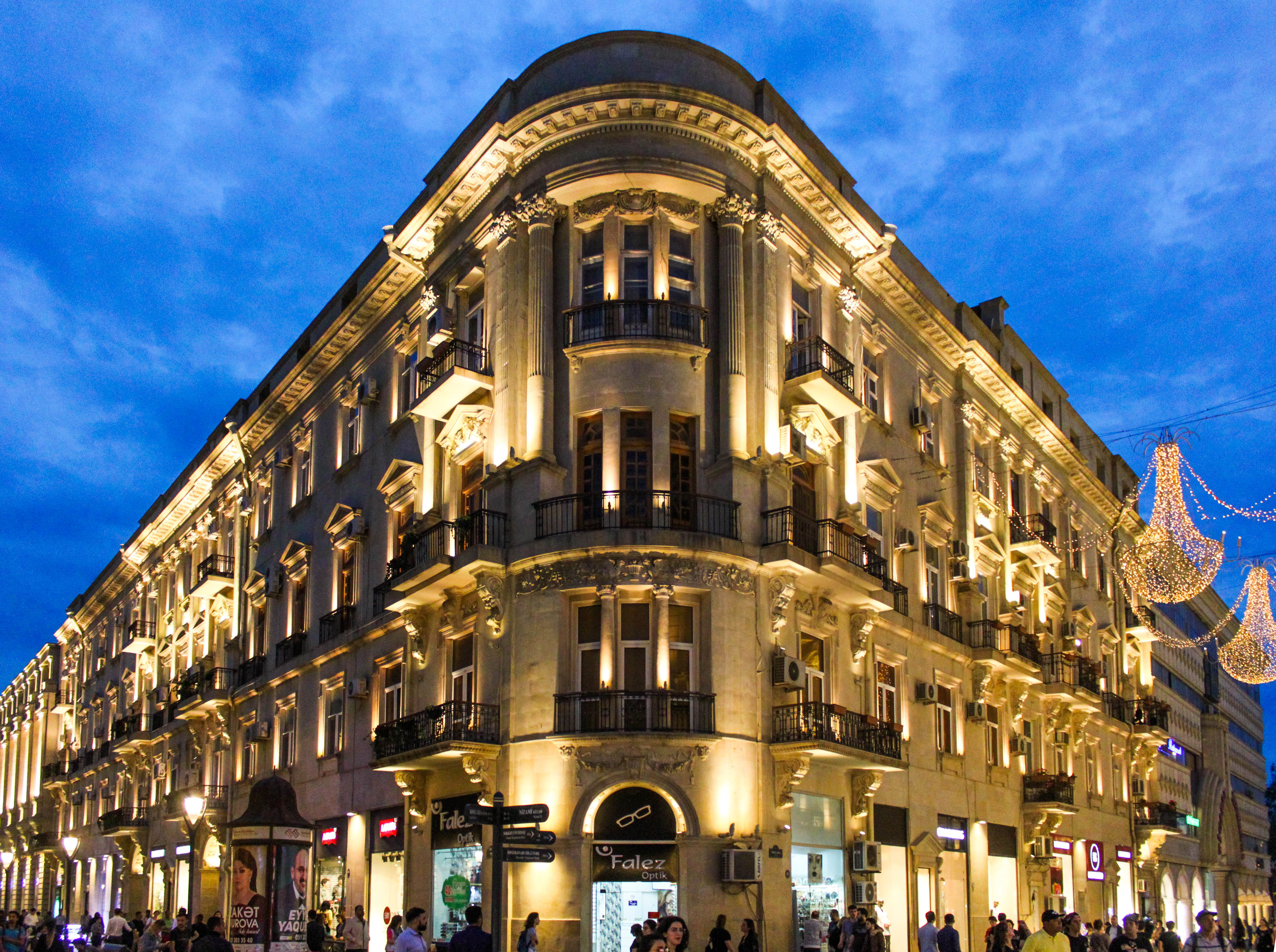
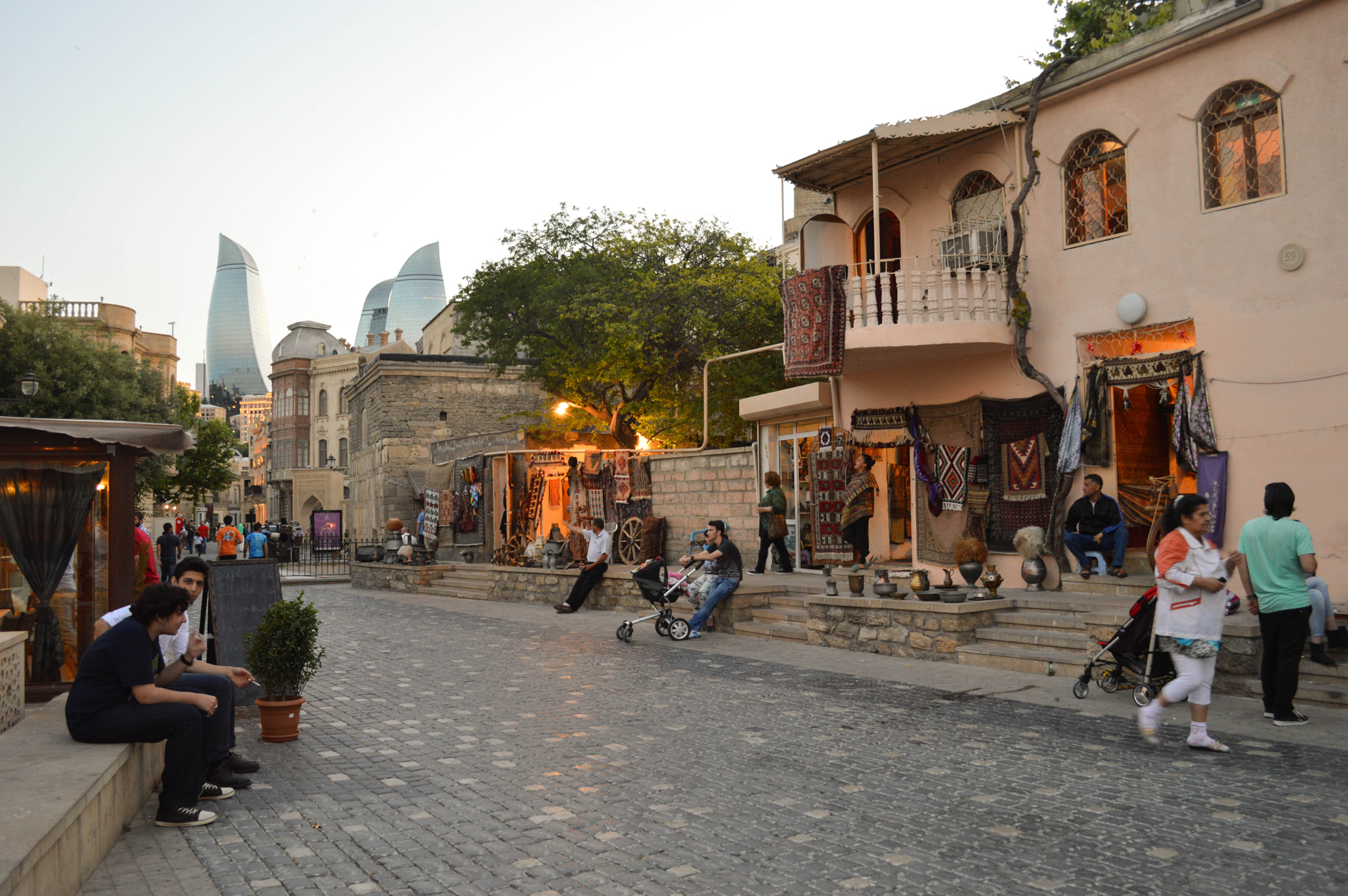
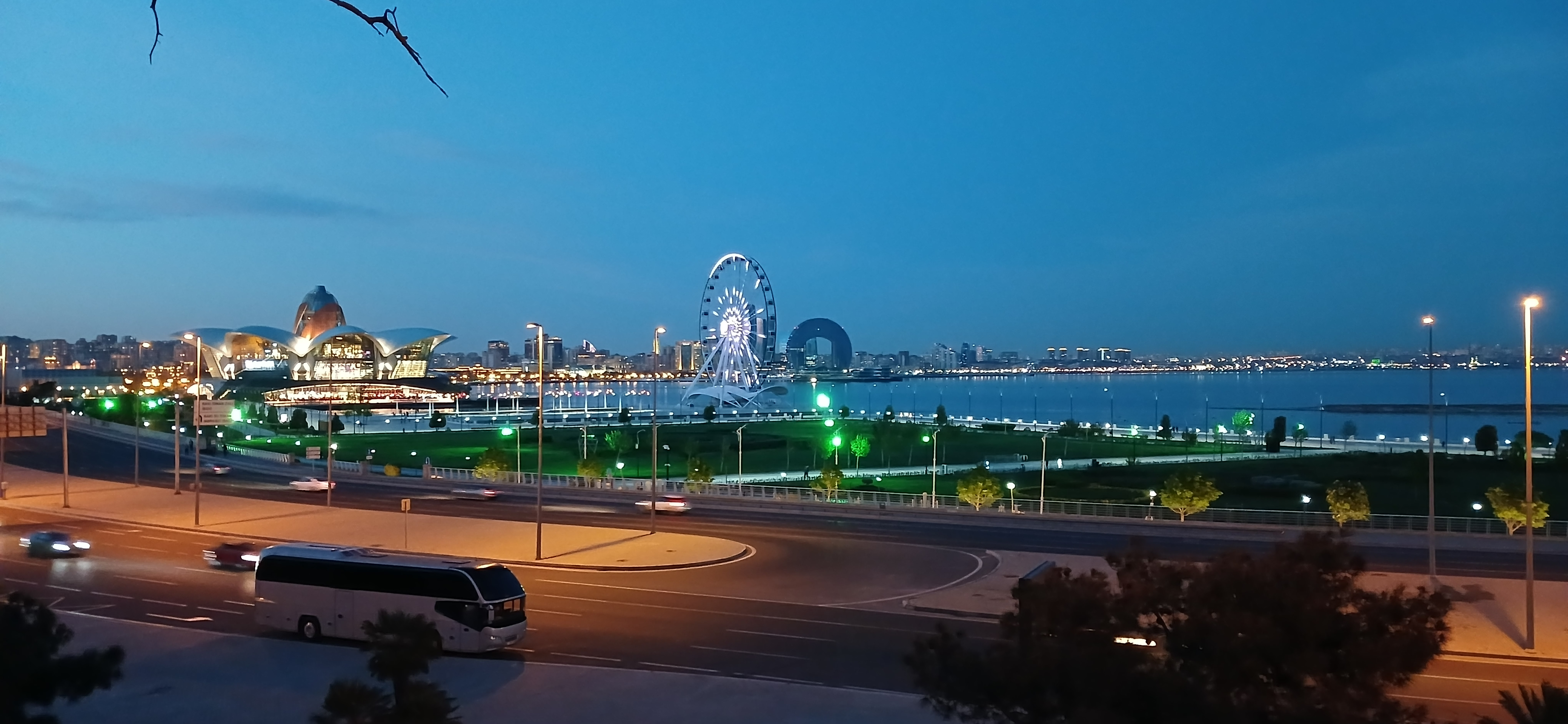
- Flame Towers Neftchiler Avenue Old City Fountain Maiden Tower Azadliq Square Nizami Street Old City Deniz Mall and Baku Eye

- Location of Sabayil in Baku
- Country: Azerbaijan
- City: Baku
- Region: Baku Economic Region

Government
  - Body: Sabail Rayon Executive Power
  - Mayor: Eldar Azizov

Area
  - Total: 29 km^{2} (11 sq mi)

Population
  - Total: 102,300
  - Density: 3,500/km^{2} (9,100/sq mi)
- Time zone: UTC+4
- Postal code: AZ1000
- Area code: +994 12
- Website: sabail-ih.gov.az

Sabail raion (Azerbaijani: Səbail rayonu) is one of the 12 raions of the capital city of Baku, located on the Caspian shore. It is the oldest district in the city. It contains the Old City of Baku and the Baku Boulevard, as well as the settlements Badamdar and Bibiheybət, the administrative territorial divisions no. 1 and no. 2, the municipalities of Badamdar, Bibiheybət and Sabail, and is bordered by the raions of Nasimi, Yasamal and Garadagh. Current head of the raion's executive power is Eldar Azizov (since 2015). The governing body includes the juridical, socio-economic and other departments.

== History ==
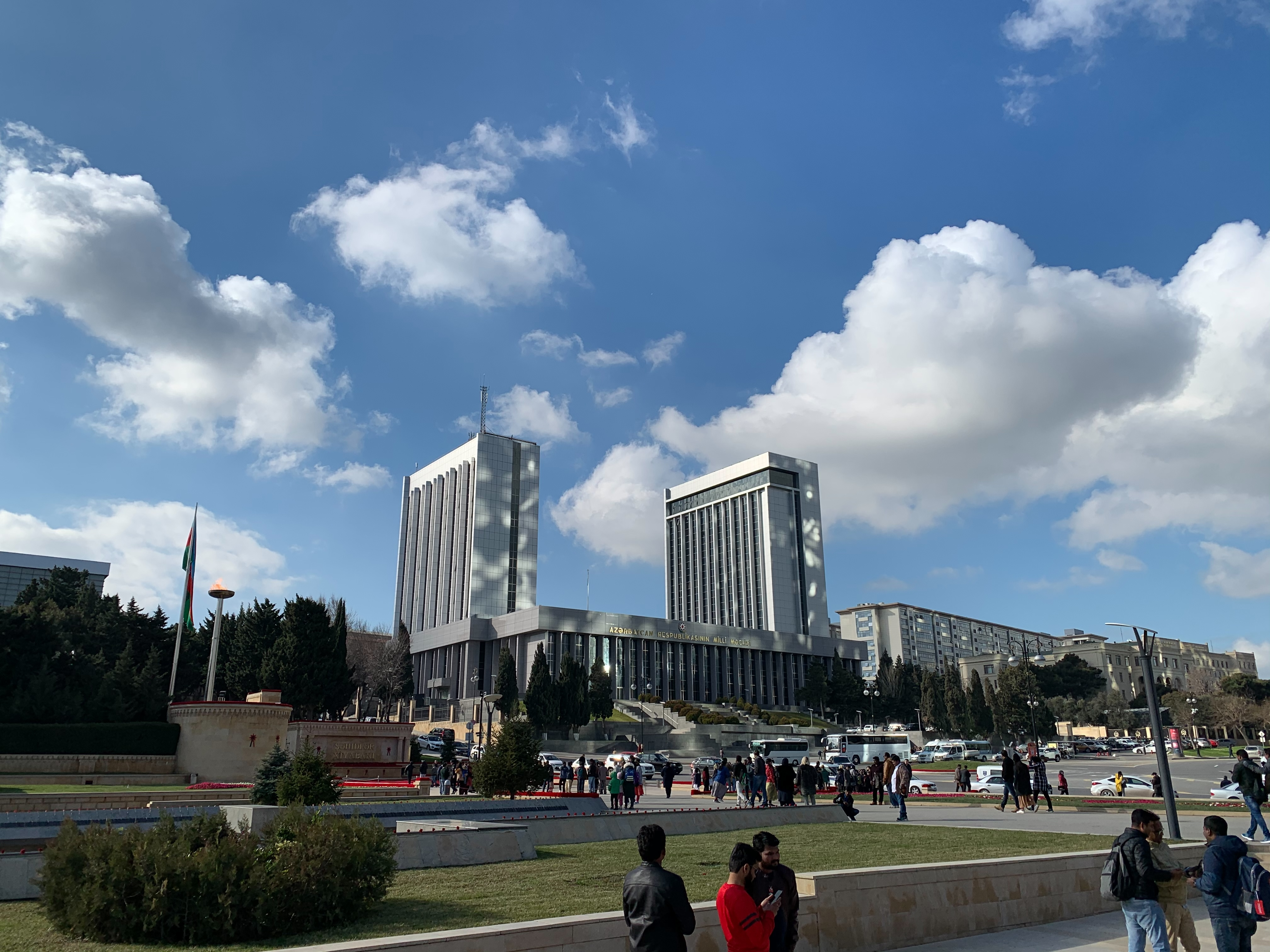
National Assembly

Originally named Bayil Bibi-Heybat, the raion assumed the name of Joseph Stalin in 1931 and in 1960 was renamed after 26 Baku Commissars. On April 29, 1992, the raion gained the name of Sabail, the historical architectural ensemble about 350 m south-west to the Baku Bay.

Sabail castle is a historical monument built in the 13th century located near the Baku Bay and remained under the seawater due to tectonic activities in the 14th century. Sabail Castle surrounded with a stone wall (180 m length and 40 m width) consisting of 3 circular and 12 semicircular towers.

The castle was named distinctly in various sources as the City underwater, Bayil Stones, Caravansarai. There is also a legend about the name Sabail coming from Saba city located near Baku.

== About ==
Park Bulvar Mall

The Office of Azerbaijan President, Milli Majlis, Cabinet of Ministers, Constitutional Court, Executive Power of Baku city, Government House, a few ministries, state committees, 13 embassies to Azerbaijan, offices of international organizations and companies are located in Sabail raion.

Popular destinations of citizens and tourists, like Martyrs' Avenue, Alley of Honor, Heydar Aliyev Foundation, Mugham Center, Old City, National Flag Square, Fountains Square, Nizami str, Baku Boulevard, Azadliq Square, Baku Funicular are in the area of this raion as well.

There are 5 universities, 17 schools, 18 kindergartens, 3 creative centers for children, 3 sport schools, 3 music schools, 22 health centers, 2 sport complexes, 47 hotels, additionally, 7 theaters, 5 libraries, 16 museums, 5 culture houses, 4 parks, 18 leisure gardens in this region.

== Sport ==
Sabayil District features 2 sports complexes, Handball Stadium as well as the Baku Aquatics Centre. It is also home to the Specialized Olympic Reserve Children's and Youth Schools, a Children's and Youth Sports and Gymnastics School, and the Chess School No. 3 Facilities of these schools are regularly used for holding sports competitions.

Sabayil was also home to the hosting of the European Olympic Games, that were held in 2015 in the city of Baku. By the order of the President of the Republic of Azerbaijan, Ilham Aliyev, the Baku Aquatics Centre (Aquatics Palace), Velopark, and the European Games Park were to be built in the Bayil residental area. The construction of a new 2-story Sports Complex with a total area of 2400 sq. meters was also commenced. Azerbaijani professional football club Sabail is also based in the district. The club competes in the Azerbaijan Premier League, first tear of Azerbaijani football.

=== Facilities ===
==== Aquatics Palace ====
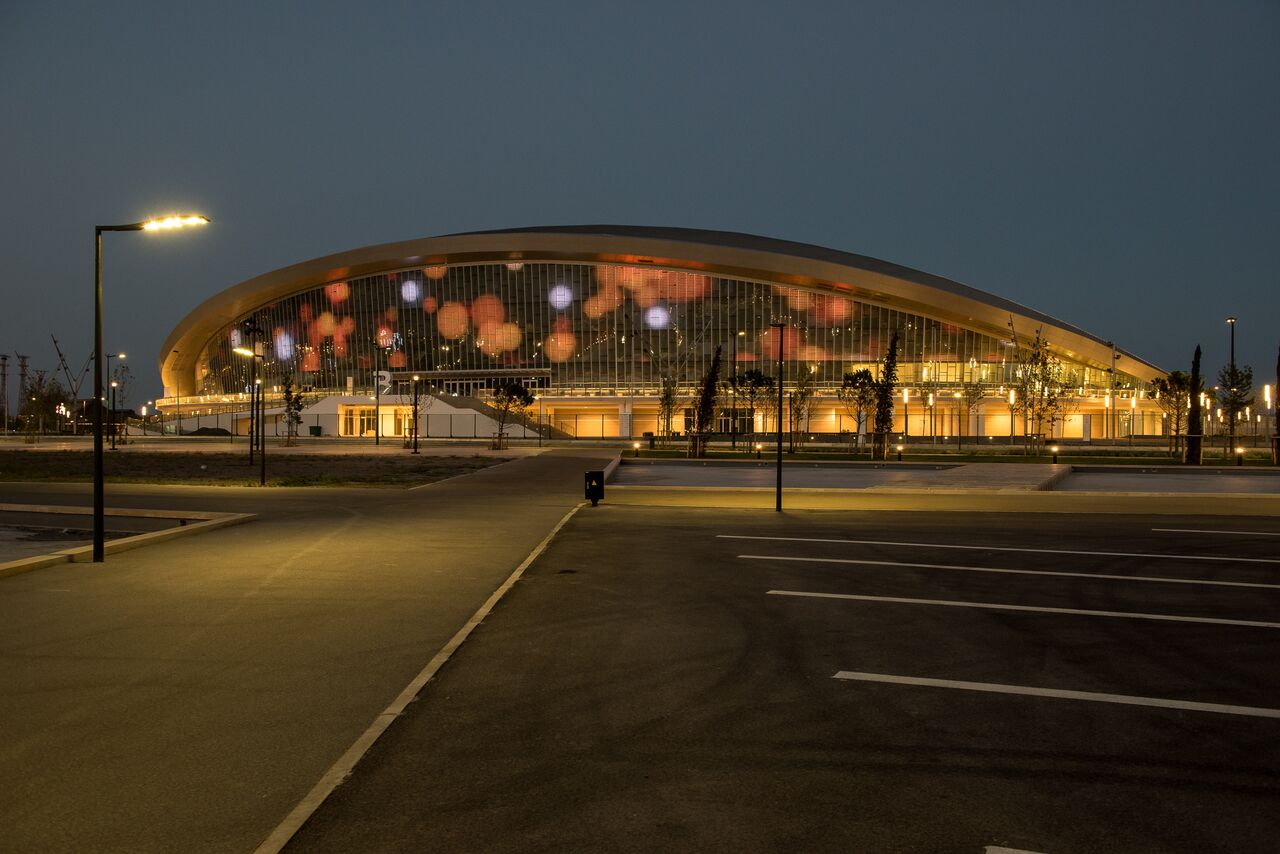
Baku Aquatic Palace

Aquatic Palace was opened for public usage on April 20, 2015. It is located in the newly built park of Baku Boulevard. The total size of the palace is about 72 thousand square meters. It was built under the premises that the new Aquatics Palace would full meet the requirement of the International Swimming Federation. It features 3 pools, that are 50 meters long, 25 meters wide, and 2.5 meters deep. It is intended for local and international competitions of various types of aquatics. The diving pool of the main hall is 25 meters long. A five-stage diving platform, with a height of 1, 3, 5, 7.5, and 10 meters are also present. Pools of the Aquatic Palace were built by an Italian Company called Myrtha Pools, an official partner of the International Swimming Federation. The palace is able to hold 6 thousand spectators at once, with section for disabled individuals, VVIP, VIP and media being features as well. A 150-seat restaurant, 500-space surface parking, fitness, acrobatics, weightlifting halls and special training platforms built for swimmers were also constructed. A swimming pool specifically designed for training, which is 51 meters in length and 20 meters in width was consctured as well.

==== Bicycle Park ====
Bicycle Park was opened on May 13, 2015. It mostly covers the area of the Bayil settlement. It was built in the early 1970s, at the initiative of Heydar Aliyev. In 2013, the territory of the park was assigned to the Azerbaijan Cycling Federation. During the past couple of years, the federation has been able to carry out large-scale landscaping work on an area of 20 hectares, where thousands of trees were planted. Four bicycle routes and mountain hiking trails were also being built. A BMX bicycle park, with a total area of more than 30 hectares, that was used at the European Games, was also constructed on the territory of the park. The condititons of the venue fully comply with the standards of the International Cyclist Union. The BMX park has a total capacity of 1,197 spectators. A registration center, work, doping control, doping analysis rooms, a 25-seat conference hall and other auxiliary rooms have been created in the two-story office building built on the territory of the bike park.

==== Baku Sports ====
Baku Sports Palace was reopened on April 20, 2015, following extensive renovations. The facility, redesigned to meet modern Olympic and Paralympic standards, spans 32,000 square meters and includes a main sports hall and a technical building. Renovations increased the seating capacity from 1,100 to 1,736 with the addition of two-sided spectator stands. Special rooms were constructed for judges, press representatives, and VIP guests.

The building features advanced amenities, including a state-of-the-art ventilation system tailored for badminton and table tennis competitions, doping control rooms, cafes for spectators and athletes, and workspaces for event organizers. Accessibility was prioritized with six modern elevators and comprehensive facilities for individuals with physical disabilities. The venue was used for badminton and table tennis events during the 2015 European Games.

==== European Games Park ====
European Games Park, opened on May 13, 2015, hosts water polo, beach volleyball, beach football, and basketball competitions. Spanning 18 hectares, the park includes three sports facilities and four functional zones. Construction covers an area of approximately 70,000 square meters.

A water complex, hosting two pools equipped with seating capacities of 1,836 and 560, alongside VIP areas, cafes and meeting rooms, a Basketball Complex, with a court designed for 3x3 basketball, and a Beach Volleyball and Beach Football Complex, with a seating capacity of 2,931 seats, three regular cours with 302 seats each, and two training cours. The park also includes parking, press facilities, broadcasting infrastructure, and world-class sports equipment used in renowned arenas globally.

==== Baku Crystal Hall ====
The Baku Crystal Hall, opened on April 16, 2012, is a 25,000-capacity arena located on a 5,000-square-meter site. Known for its unique architecture, the hall features over 2,500 projectors and 3,000 meters of wiring sourced from Germany. Modern LED technology, including 1,300 square meters of LED screens, enhances the venue's functionality. It was a key venue for the 2012 Eurovision Song Contest and other major events. The hall also hosted Lionel Messi's visit to the capital city, alongside Luis Suarez, Sergio Busquets and Jordi Alba.

==== ASCO Arena ====
The ASCO Arena, previously known as Bayil Arena, was inaugurated in September 2012 and renamed in April 2019. The stadium seats 5,000 spectators and has hosted matches for the FIFA U-17 Women's World Cup 2012, international friendlies, and serves as the home ground for the Sabail FC.

==== Sports and Recreation Park ====
Sports and Recreation Park, opened on October 28, 2017, spans 1.7 hectares near the Baku Aquatics Centre. The park includes two basketball courts, handball and mini-football courts, outdoor sports simulators, and a 450-square-meter skateboarding area for children and adults. Additional amenities include table tennis tables, children's play areas, and swings. The park is equipped with modern lighting for evening activities.

== Transport ==
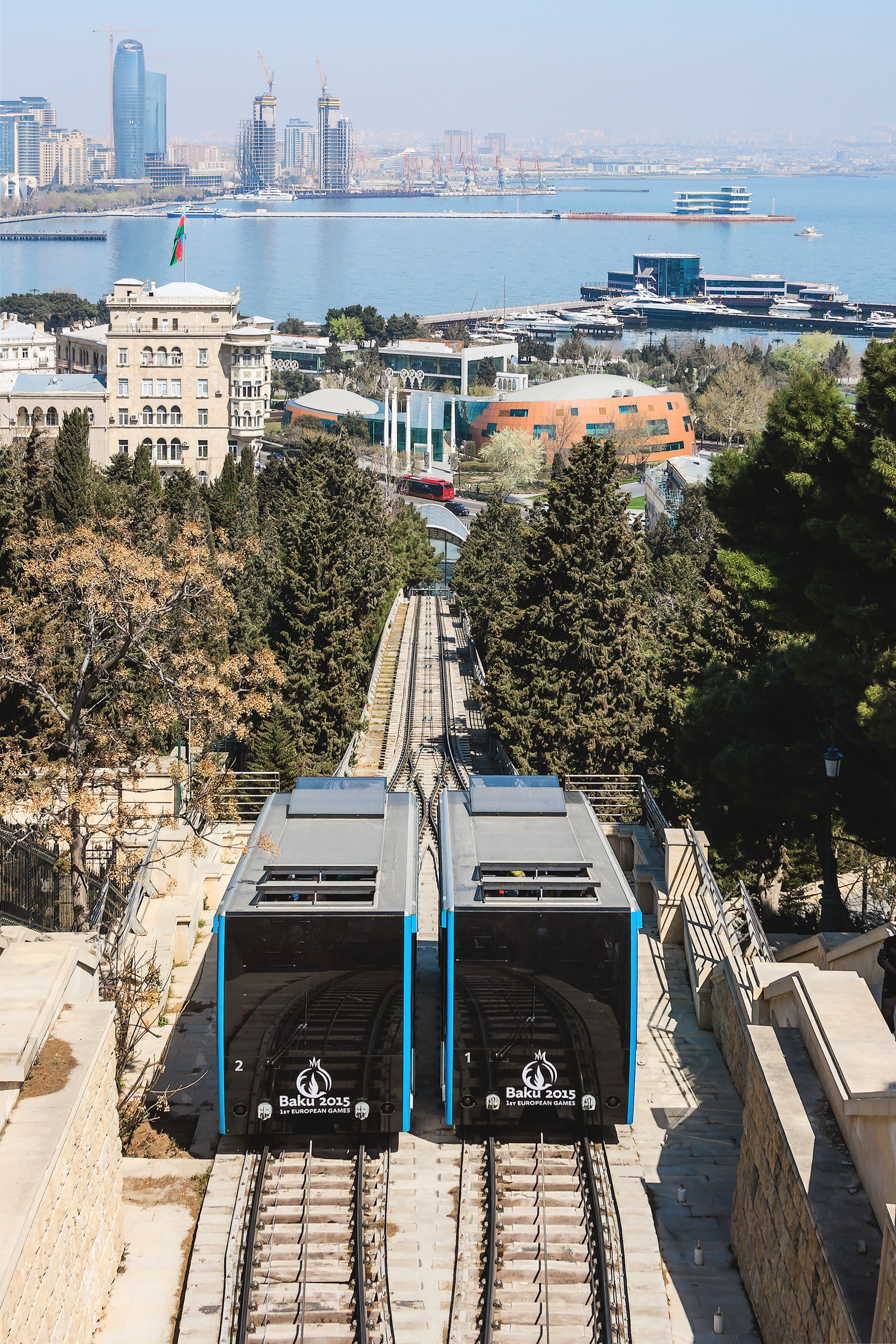
Funicular in Baku, Azerbaijan

=== Road ===
Neftchilar Avenue

=== Metro ===
Icheri Sheher and Sahil metro stations are located in this area.

=== Funicular ===
Baku Funicular is located in this area.

== See also ==
- Executive Power of Baku city
- Administrative divisions of Azerbaijan
