= Inshaatchilar (Baku Metro) =

Baku Metro station

İnşaatçılar
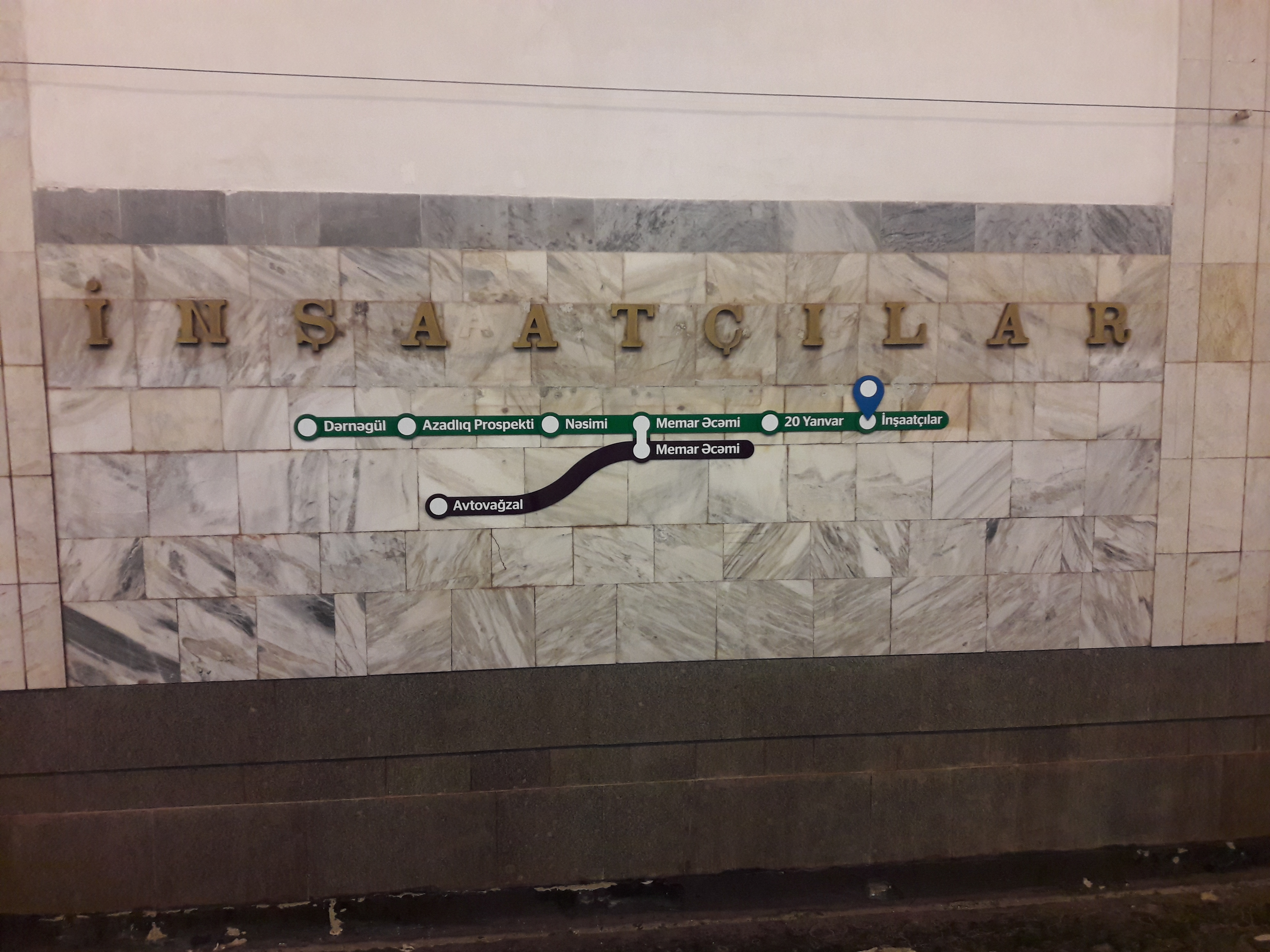

General information
- Location: Baku, Azerbaijan
- Coordinates: 40.23°N 49.4809°E
- System: Baku Metro station
- Owner: Baku Metro
- Line: Green line
- Tracks: 2
- Connections: 9, 14, 17, 18, 39, 77, 96, 165, 205 (future); Blue Line

History
- Opened: 31 December 1985

Services
Preceding station	Baku Metro	Following station
20 Yanvar towards Darnagul	Green line	Elmler Akademiyasi towards Hazi Aslanov or Bakmil
Location

Inshaatchilar (Azerbaijani: İnşaatçılar, pronounced [inʃɑ.ɑt͡ʃːɯˈɫɑɾ]) is a Baku Metro station. It was opened on 31 December 1985. The station is located in Yasamal district under Abbas Mirza Narifzade Street. Its length is 6.4 km.

== See also ==
- List of Baku metro stations
