= Neftchilar (Baku Metro) =

Baku Metro station

General information
- Coordinates: 40.3953°N 49.8822°E
- Owner: Baku Metro
- Line: Red line
- Tracks: 1
- Connections: 1, 7A, 11, 12, 15, 22, 32, 36, 44, 51, 54, 62, 66, 70, 76, 78, 103, 105, 141, 214

History
- Opened: 6 November 1970

Services
Preceding station	Baku Metro	Following station
Gara Garayev towards Icheri Sheher	Red line	Halglar Doslugu towards Hazi Aslanov
Gara Garayev towards Darnagul	Green line	Halglar Doslugu towards Hazi Aslanov
Location

Neftchilar (Azerbaijani: Neftçilər) is a subway station in Baku Metro. It was opened on 6 November 1972. The station was opened on November 6, 1972, in one line with the neighboring stations "Koroğlu" - "Kara Karayev". It is located in the settlement "8th kilometer". The walls of the station are decorated with multi-colored mosaic panels depicting the work of oil workers. The author of these mosaic panels was Arif Agamalov. In the middle of the hall there is a double row of silver, corrugated columns. On the ceiling, cut into cells, there are fluorescent lamps that give a soft, even light. The floor of the station is covered with multi-colored patterned granite and matches well with the wall panels and the elegance of the columns.

Until 1989, when the line was extended to the station "Akhmedli", the station was the final one. Behind the station there is a two-track turnaround dead end.

When approaching the station, a fragment from the song “Song of Friendship” (from Azerbaijani: “Dostluq mahnısı”) by composer Tofik Kuliyev is played in the carriages.

== See also ==
- List of Baku metro stations
