= Badamdar =

- Municipality
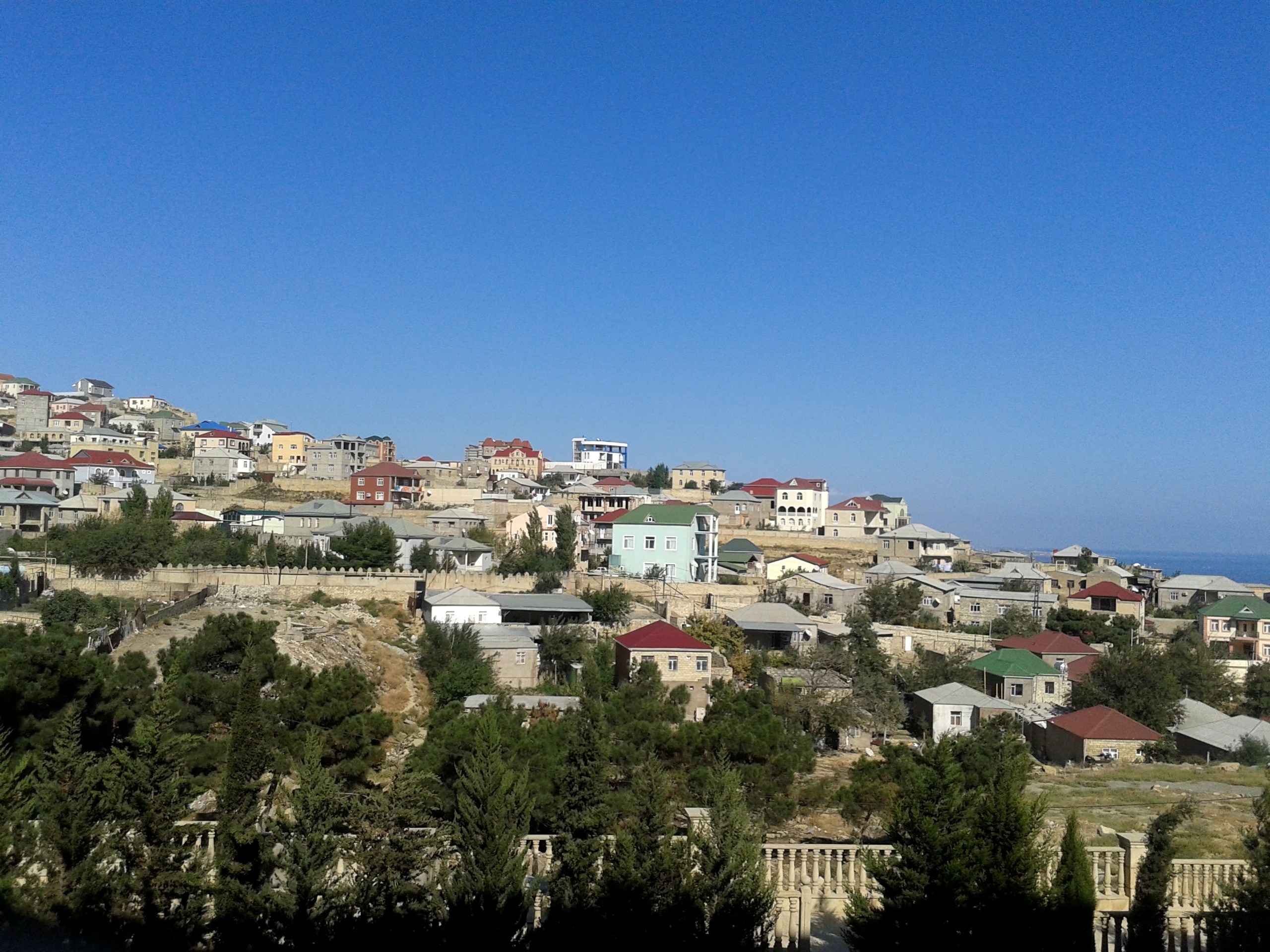

- Location within Azerbaijan
- Coordinates: 40°20′22″N 49°48′14″E
- Country: Azerbaijan
- City: Baku
- District: Sabail

Population (2023)
  - Total: 21,938
- Time zone: UTC+4 (AZT)
  - Summer (DST): UTC+5 (AZT)

Badamdar is a municipality in Baku, Azerbaijan. It has a population of 11,871.

The name Badamdar (بادام‌دار) is from Persian Badam (بادام), ‘almonds’ and dar (دار), ‘tree’. It is located in Sabail district, to the south of Baku. In Sebail district, there are three municipalities: Badamdar, Sabail, and Bibiheybet. Badamdar settlement (qesebe) is situated in mountainous area. The total area of the municipality constitutes 9700 square meters. Population of the municipality is 21,633. The population works mainly in industrial enterprises and services. There are social facilities, hotels and a car market. In recent years, it has become a large residential area of Baku.

Thus, in accordance with the law on status of municipalities, there are 15 elected members

In 1990, it received the status of a settlement.

== Transportation ==
=== Road ===
M3 Azerbaijan highway bypass Badamdar.

European route E119. AH8 Asian.

=== Metro ===
The Badamdar Metro Station Q-1 in

Red line

is planned in this area by Baku Metro in the future.
