= Əhmədli, Baku =

Əhmədli
- Town and Municipality
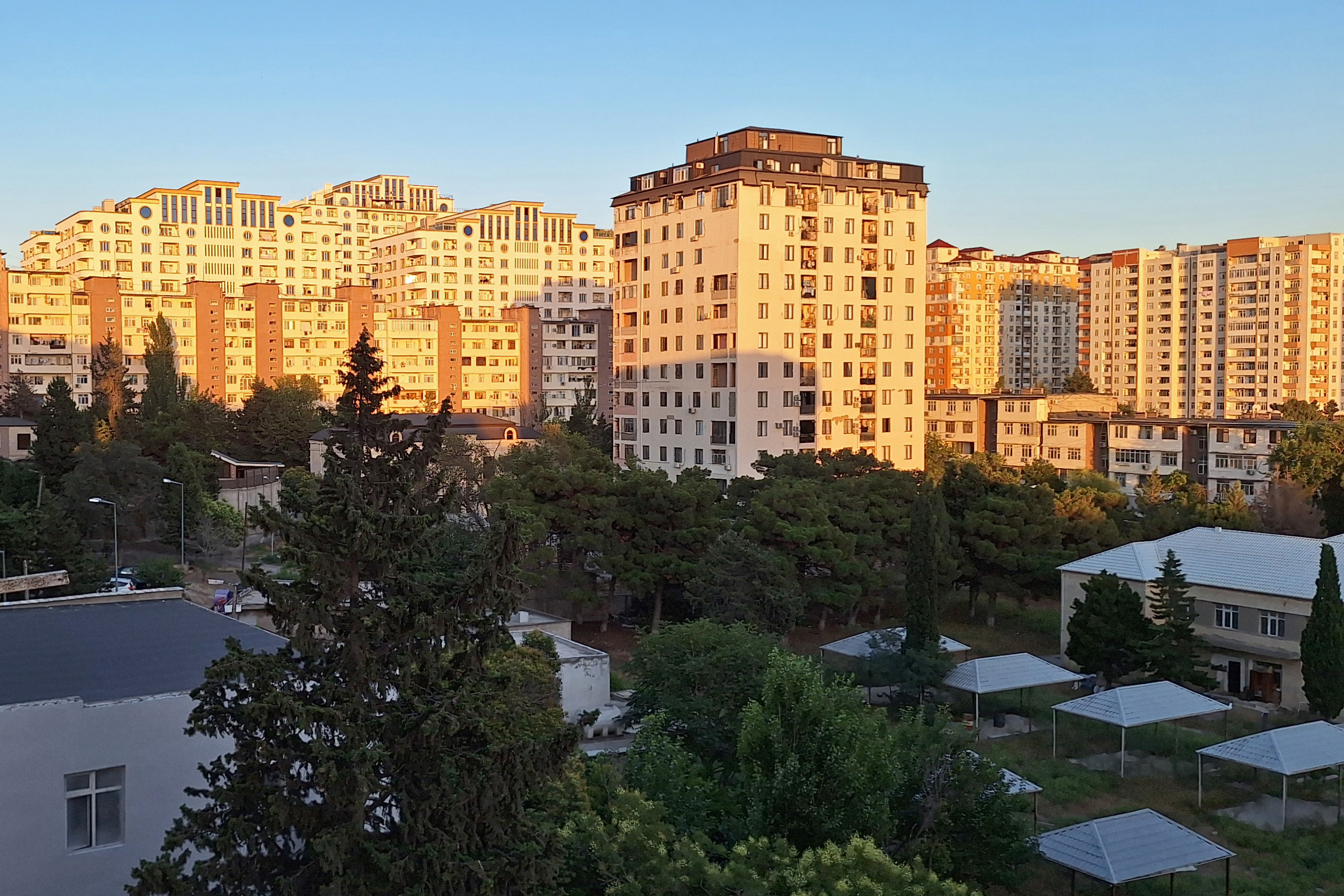
- Ahmedli Town

- Location within Azerbaijan
- Coordinates: 40°22′41″N 49°57′43″E
- Country: Azerbaijan
- City: Baku
- District: Khatai
- Region: Absheron

Population
  - Total: 8,430
- Time zone: UTC+4 (AZT)
  - Summer (DST): UTC+5 (AZT)
- Postal code: AZ1000
- Climate: Csa

Əhmədli (Ahmedli) is a municipality in Baku, Azerbaijan. It has a population of 8,430. There is Ahmedli (Baku Metro), one of the Baku Metro stations in the town. It was opened on 28 April 1989.

== History ==
It starts from the period when the Shirvanshahlar state fell under the influence of the Seljuk Empire in the middle of the 11th century. During the reign of Seljuk sultan Toghrul Bey (1040–1063), some of the Seljug tribes who began to settle in the territory of Azerbaijan came to the Absheron peninsula, as well as the area of the current Ahmedli village, in search of fertile lands.

They built a residential house, a school, a mosque, a bath (hamam), and many important objects here. That mosque and hamam suffered various damages until the 20th century, were repeatedly repaired and restored, and continue their activities today. It is not known how the village was called during this period.

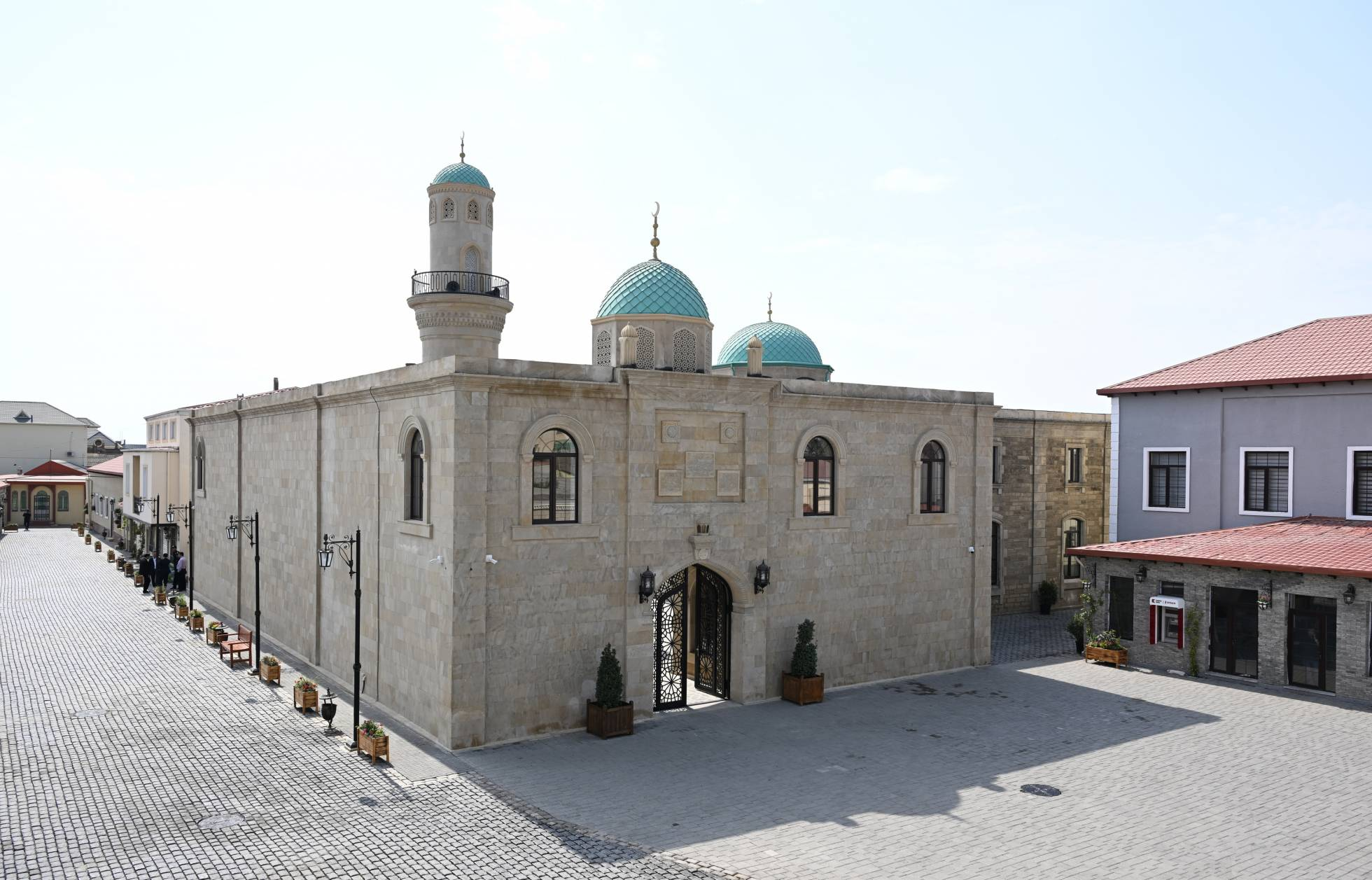
Ahmadli mosque
