= Halglar Dostlugu (Baku Metro) =

Baku Metro Station

Halglar Dostlugu Xalqlar Dostluğu
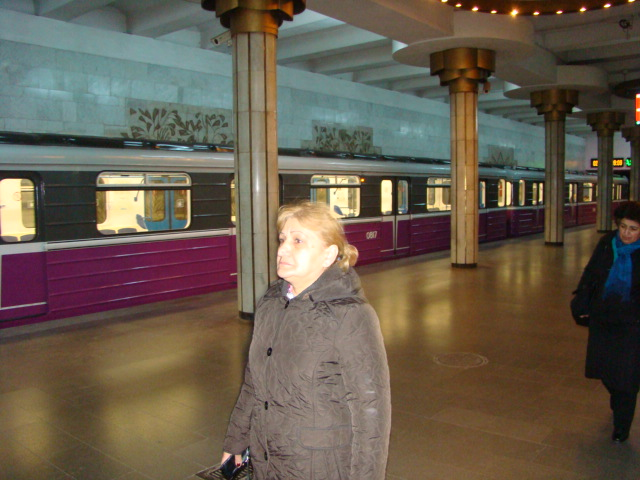
- Halglar Doslugu metro station

General information
- Location: Baku; Azerbaijan
- Coordinates: 40.3953°N 49.8822°E
- System: Baku Metro station
- Owner: Baku Metro
- Line: Red line
- Tracks: 2
- Connections: 7A, 11, 12, 30, 35, 36, 40, 44, 49, 50, 51, 57, 60, 62, 64, 70, 81 (future) Purple line

History
- Opened: 28 April 1989

Services
Preceding station	Baku Metro	Following station
Neftchilar towards Icheri Sheher	Red line	Ahmedli towards Hazi Aslanov
Neftchilar towards Darnagul	Green line	Ahmedli towards Hazi Aslanov
Location

Halglar Dostlugu (Azerbaijani: Xalqlar Dostluğu) is a Baku Metro station. It was opened on 28 April 1989.

== See also ==
- List of Baku metro stations
