= List of Baku Metro stations =

This is a list of metro stations of Baku Metro in Baku, Azerbaijan. At present Baku Metro has 27 metro stations. The Red Line (Qırmızı xətt) has 13 metro stations, the Green Line (Yaşıl xətt) has 10 metro stations and the Purple Line (Bənövşəyi xətt) has 4 metro stations.

== Stations ==
Iceri Seher Metro Station

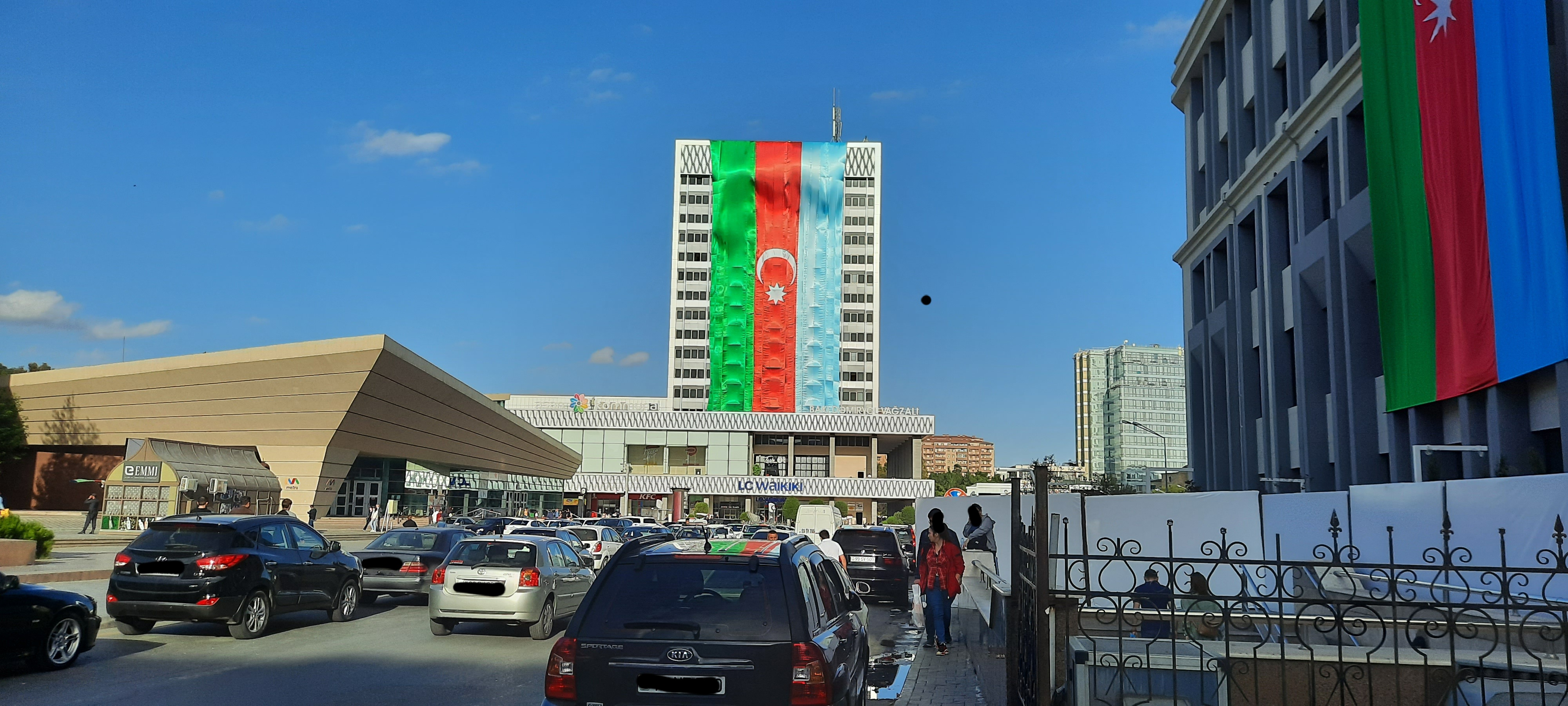
28 May Metro Station

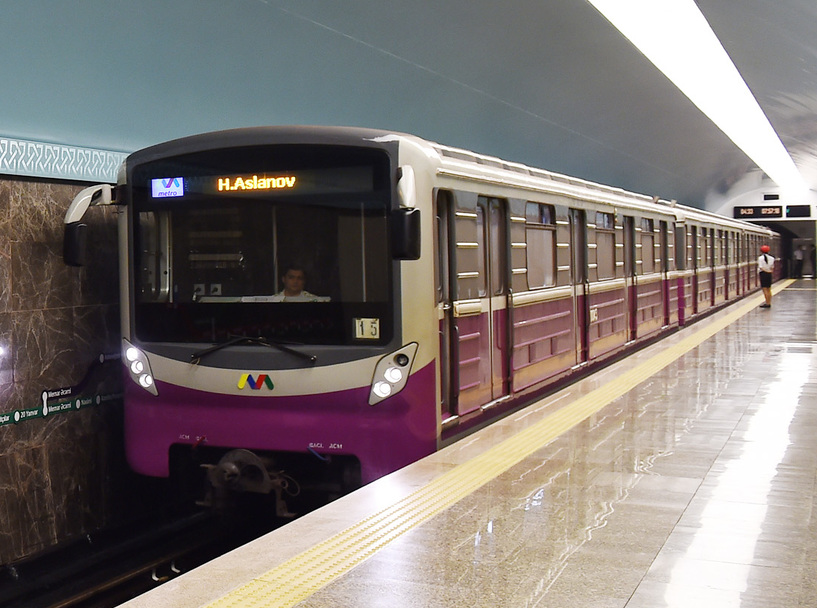
Sahil Metro Station (Train 81-717M/714M Type with new front-Modernized locally by Baku Metro LLC)

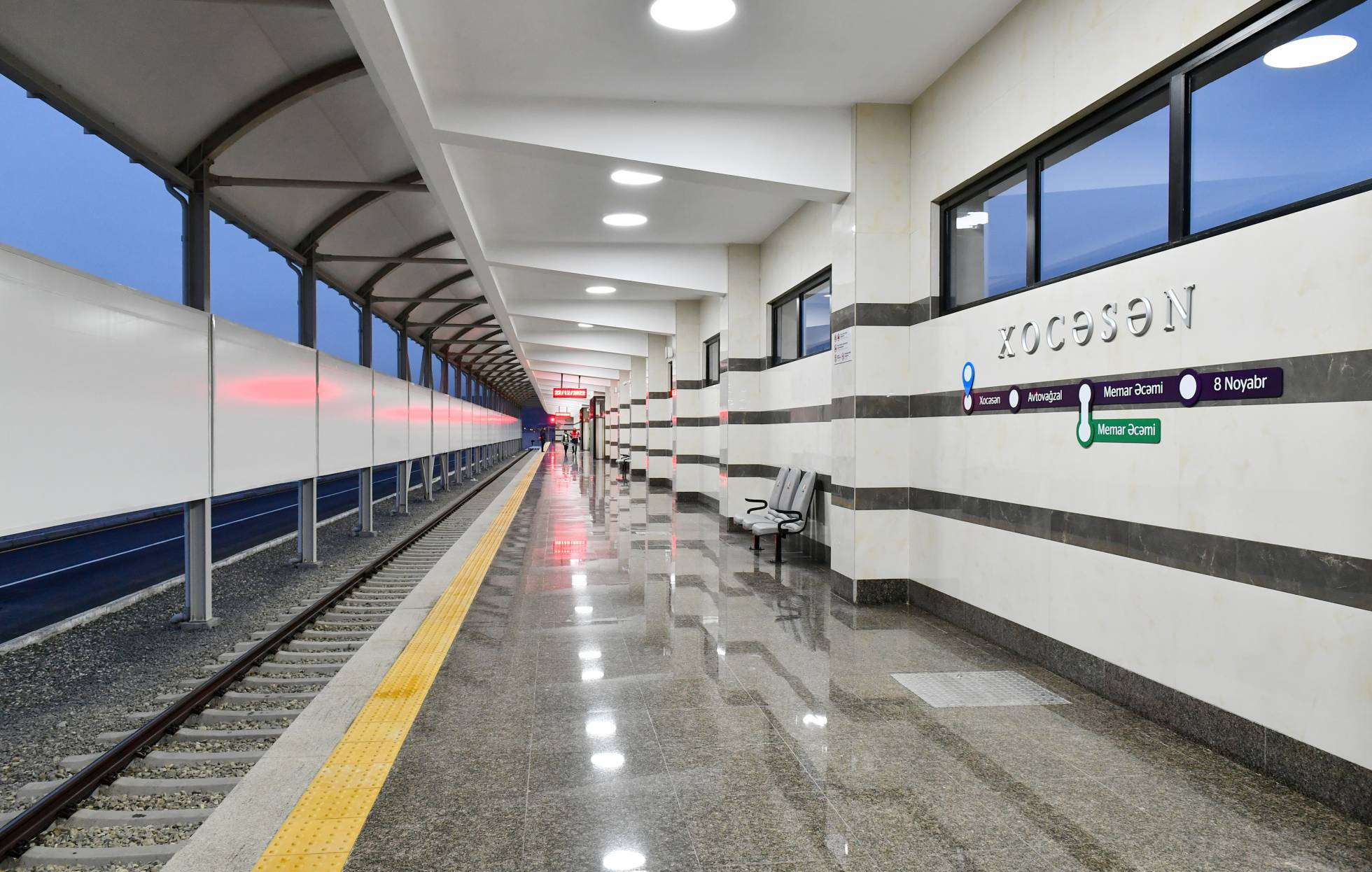
Khojasan station

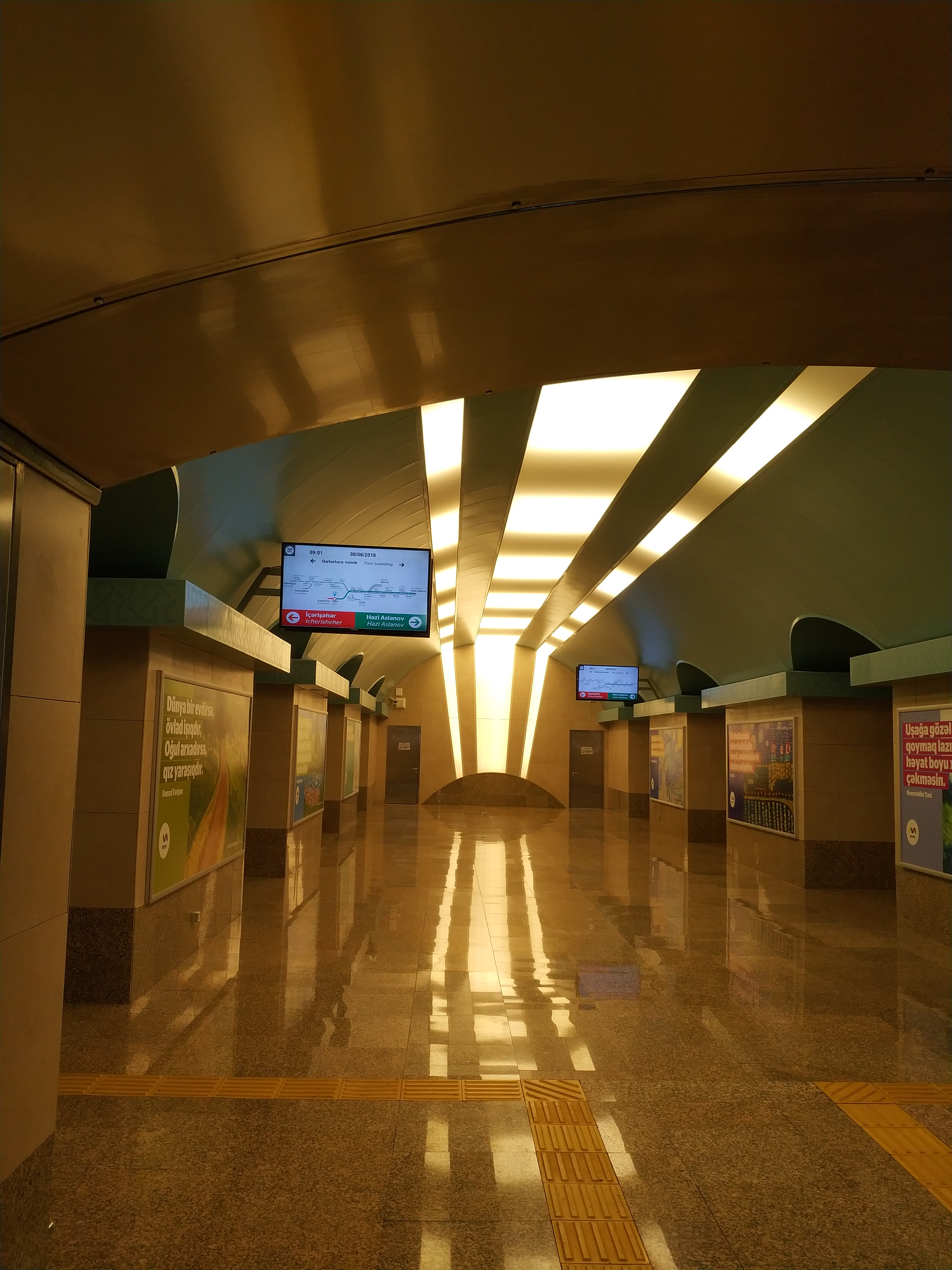
Sahil Metro Station

Line(s)	Number of Stations	Structure	Opening date	Length (km)					
Line(s)	Number of Stations	Structure	Opening date	Length (km)	M1	13	12 Underground, 1 Surface	1967	20.1
M2	10	10 Underground	1976	14.5					
M3	4	3 Underground, 1 Surface	2016	6.1					
Total	27			40.7					

List of open stations
Station name (English)	Station name (Azerbaijani)	Line(s)	Structure	Opening date	Interchange
Icheri Sheher Baku Soviet (1967-2007)	İçərişəhər Bakı Soveti (1967-2007)		pylon, deep	November 6, 1967	
Sahil 26 Baku Commissars (1967-1992)	Sahil 26 Bakı komissarı (1967-1992)		pylon, deep	November 6, 1967	
28 May 28 April (1967-1992)	28 May 28 Aprel (1967-1992)		pylon, deep	November 6, 1967	
Ganjlik	Gənclik		columnar, medium deep	November 6, 1967	
Nariman Narimanov	Nəriman Nərimanov		columnar, medium deep	November 6, 1967	
Bakmil Elektrozavod (1979-1998)	Bakmil Elektrozavod (1979-1998)		isurface, one-way	March 28, 1979	
Ulduz	Ulduz		columnar, medium deep	May 5, 1970	
Koroglu Mashadi Azizbeyov (1972-2011)	Koroğlu Məşədi Əzizbəyov (1972-2011)		columnar, medium deep	November 7, 1972	Park and ride
Gara Garayev Avrora (1972-1991)	Qara Qarayev Avrora (1972-1991)		columnar, medium deep	November 7, 1972	
Neftchilar	Neftçilər		columnar, medium deep	November 7, 1972	
Halglar Doslugu	Xalqlar Dostluğu		columnar, medium deep	April 28, 1989	
Ahmedli	Əhmədli		columnar, medium deep	April 28, 1989	
Hazi Aslanov	Həzi Aslanov		columnar, medium deep	December 10, 2002	
Darnagul	Dərnəgül		single-vault, medium deep	June 29, 2011	
Azadlig Prospekti	Azadlıq prospekti		single-vault, medium deep	December 30, 2009	
Nasimi	Nəsimi		columnar, medium deep	October 9, 2008	
Memar Ajami	Memar Əcəmi		columnar, medium deep	December 31, 1985	
20 Yanvar XI Red Army Square (1985-1992)	20 Yanvar XI Qızıl Ordu Meydanı (1985-1992)		columnar, medium deep	December 31, 1985	
Inshaatchilar'	İnşaatçılar		columnar, medium deep	December 31, 1985	
Elmlar Akademiyası	Elmlər Akademiyası		pylon, deep	December 31, 1985	
Nizami Ganjavi	Nizami Gəncəvi		pylon, deep	December 31, 1976	
Jafar Jabbarli	Cəfər Cabbarlı		pylon, deep	December 27, 1993	
Shah Ismail Hatai Shaumyan (1968-1992)	Şah İsmail Xətai Şaumyan (1968-1992)		pylon, deep	February 22, 1968	
Khojasan	Xocəsən		surface, one-way	December 23, 2022	
Avtovagzal	Avtovağzal		single-vault, medium deep	April 19, 2016	Park and ride
Memar Ajami-2	Memar Əcəmi-2		single-vault, deep	April 19, 2016	
8 Noyabr	8 Noyabr		single-vault, deep	May 29, 2021	

== Stations under construction ==
There are 5 stations under construction.

Station name (English)	Station name (Azerbaijani)	Line(s)	Structure	Opening date	Interchange
20 September	20 Sentyabr		single-vault, deep (Under Construction)	2026	
Darnagul Depot	Dərnəgül Deposu		surface, one-way (Under Construction)	2027	
White City (Y-14)	Ağ Şəhər		On-Hold	Until 2030	
Baku Oil Refinery (Y-15)	Azər Neft Yağ		On-Hold	Until 2030	
Hazi Aslanov-2 (Y-17)	Həzi Aslanov-2		On-Hold	Until 2030	
Kohne Guneshli (Y-18)	Kohne Gunesli		On-Hold	Until 2030	

== See also ==
- List of metro systems
