= Heydar Aliyev Baku Oil Refinery =

Oil refinery in Azerbaijan

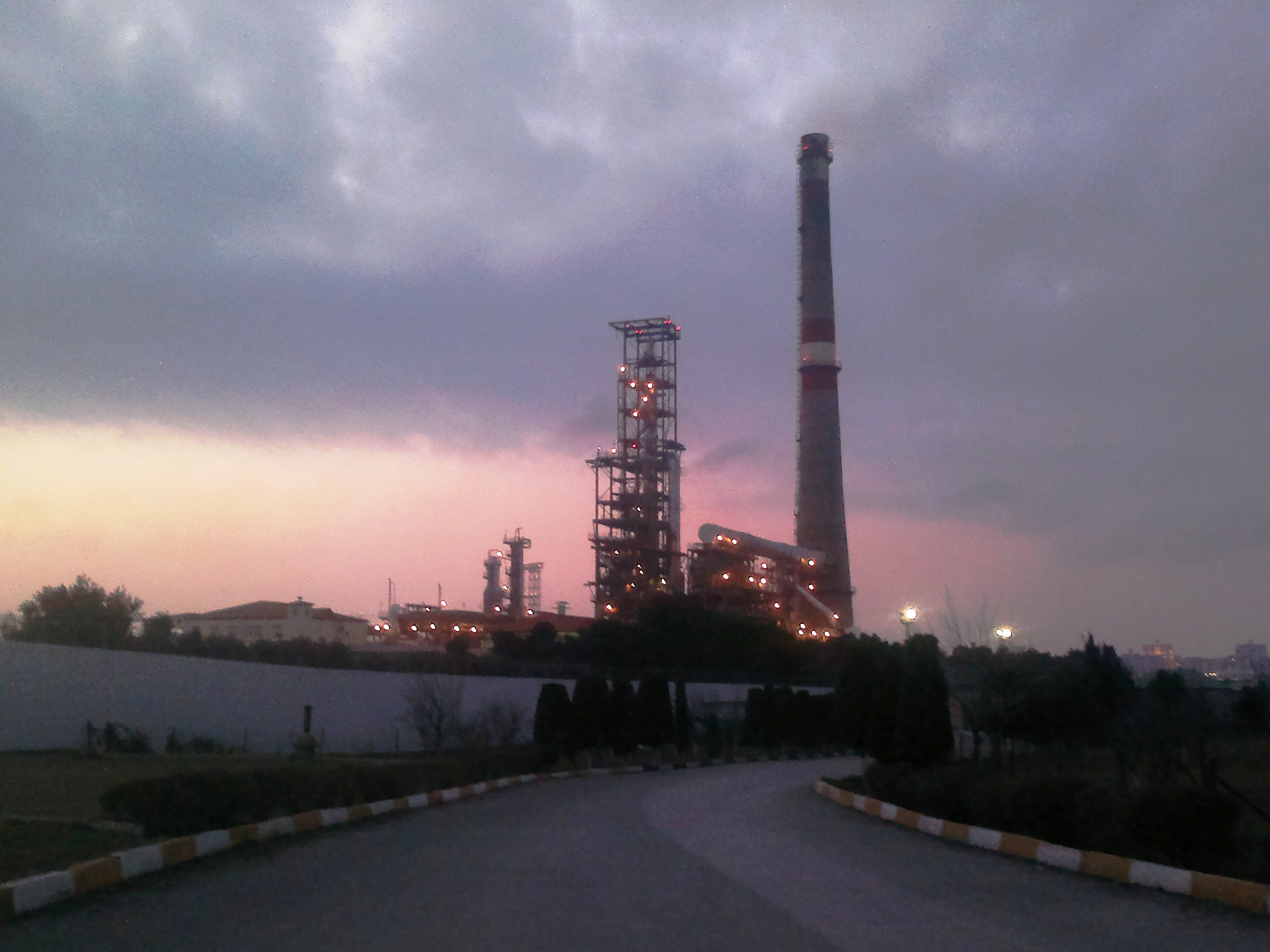

- Location of Heydar Aliyev Baku Oil Refinery in Azerbaijan
- Location: Baku, Azerbaijan; 40°24′24.4584″N 49°55′07.4352″E

Refinery details
- Operator: SOCAR
- Owner: SOCAR
- Opened: 1953
- Capacity: 120,000 barrels per day (19,000 m^{3}/d)

The Heydar Aliyev Baku Oil Refinery (Azerbaijani: Heydər Əliyev adına Bakı Neft Emalı Zavodu) is an oil refinery located in Baku, Azerbaijan. It is currently the only oil refinery in Azerbaijan, capable of producing about 120,000 barrels (19,000 m^{3}) of refined products per day. The refinery meets the entire domestic demand for petroleum products and exports more than 40% of the products. The plant processes 15 different products including gasoline, diesel, jet fuel, black oil, petroleum coke, asphalt, lubricants etc. It is owned and operated by SOCAR, which is the national oil company of the Azerbaijan Republic.

== History ==
Construction of the complex of catalytic cracking units was launched in Baku by the decision of the Ministry of Oil Industry of the USSR in the former Soviet Union. A few years later, the first technological devices were placed in service. The order was issued on the establishment of the New Baku Refinery by the Ministry of Oil Industry of the USSR on date July 29, 1953. At the time, there was a shortage of high-quality gasoline in the Soviet Union, and it was natural to build the refinery in Baku, close to oil deposits.

More than 300 million tons of oil has been processed, as well as new devices have been constructed, various types of oil products have been produced in Baku Oil Refinery named after Heydar Aliyev over a period of 50 years.

21 out of 24 types of oil are processed in the Baku Oil Refinery named after Heydar Aliyev. 15 kinds of oil products are produced here as well as automobile gasoline, aviation kerosene, oil coke, black oil, diesel fuel.

Following high-tech forces operate in the plant such as ED-AV-6 facility on initial processing of oil (exploitation year 1976), the catalytic reforming unit (1980), the gradual coking unit (1986), and the catalytic cracking unit (1993).

The main unit on the primary processing of oil is ELOU-AVT-6. It is a combined-atmosphere-vacuum device with oil pre-desalination and petrol recycling blocks having capacity to process up to 6 million tons of crude oil a year. This unit is constructed in 1976 according to the reconstruction plan of Baku oil refineries. The main spare parts of the device were received from Germany.

In recent years, 80-90% of the pumping process has been replaced by the ELOU-AVT-6, the vacuum-generating system has been reconstructed. In order to improve heat exchange processes, 15 new technological layouts have been applied to prevent heat losses which is equal to 13-15 thousand conventional fuel. The main technological unit of the refinery is ED-AV-6 which was placed into service in 1976. It is a primary processing unit with electric desalting and vacuum distillation blocks of black oil. In order to meet requirements of international standards of oil, the project was organized on cleaning the fuel with alkali and production of crude naphthenic acid in this unit under the license of “Merichem” company (USA). Catalytic cracking device for the production of high octane gasoline components was built and put in service in 1993. Besides the catalytic reforming unit exploited in 1980, it helps to increase the quality of produced diesel fuel and gasoline. In honour of the 50th anniversary of "Azerneftyanajag" Oil Refinery and its achievements in production, it was renamed after Heydar Aliyev, the leader of Azerbaijan on April 22, 2004.

By order of SOCAR dated December 24, 2014, SOCAR merged it with another refinery located in Baku, Azneftyag, making it the only refinery in the country on January 1, 2015. The purpose of SOCAR in uniting Azerneftyag to the Baku Oil Refinery is to manage two factories from one center. It further announced in 2017 that the refinery will undergo a considerable renovation, so that 75-80% of the equipment would be replaced by 2020. The main goal of the renovation is to make the produced gasoline compatible with the Euro5 standard.

== Current data ==
In 2006, this entity has produced a quantity of oil which match Azerbaijan's export and internal needs. 37.9% out of overall production has been exported and 41.4% was converted into motor fuel.

45.5% percent of overall production is exported to other countries.

== International cooperation ==
In October 2015, SOCAR signed a contract with Poerner for construction of bitumen plant. In 2016, the detailed unit of bitumen unit was designed. Also in 2016 Socar signed an agreement with Air Liquide on the construction of hydrogen production plant.

In 2017, a new contract between the refinery and Tecnicas Reunidas was signed on the reconstruction of installations. Tecnimont and Kinetics Technology also joined the project on reconstruction and modernization in 2018 and proposed to build 10 installations.

After reconstruction, oil production would be 7.5 million tons of oil per year.

== Transportation ==
The Oil Refinery Metro Station is under construction in this area by Baku Metro.

== See also ==
Petroleum industry in Azerbaijan
