= Elmler Akademiyasi (Baku Metro) =

Baku Metro Station

Coordinates: 40°22′30″N 49°48′55″E

Elmlər Akademiyası
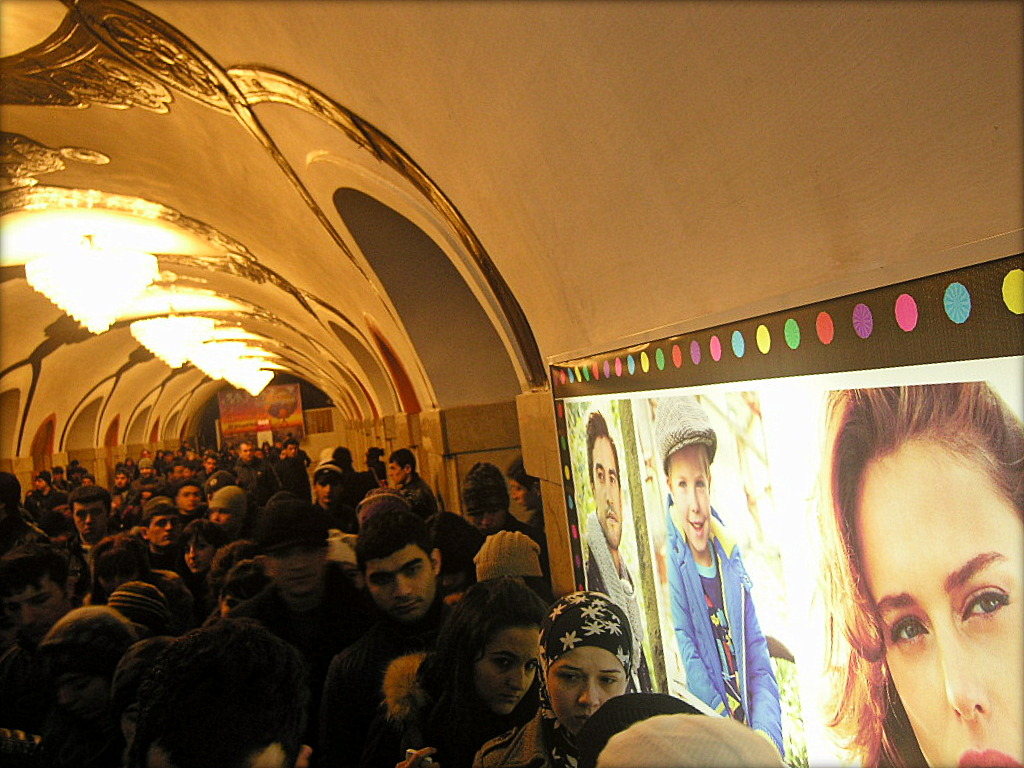

General information
- Location: Baku, Azerbaijan
- System: Baku Metro station
- Owner: Baku Metro
- Line: Green line
- Tracks: 2
- Connections: 3, 6, 10, 17, 18, 29, 39, 53, 96, 206

Construction
- Accessible: Disabled access

History
- Opened: 31 December 1985

Services
Preceding station	Baku Metro	Following station
Inshaatchilar towards Darnagul	Green line	Nizami Ganjavi towards Hazi Aslanov or Bakmil
Location

The Academy of Sciences (Azerbaijani: Elmlər Akademiyası) is a Baku Metro station, named after the nearby Azerbaijan National Academy of Sciences (Azərbaycan Milli Elmlər Akademiyası). It was opened on 31 December 1985.

== See also ==
- List of Baku metro stations
- Azerbaijan National Academy of Sciences
