= 20 Yanvar (Baku Metro) =

Baku Metro station

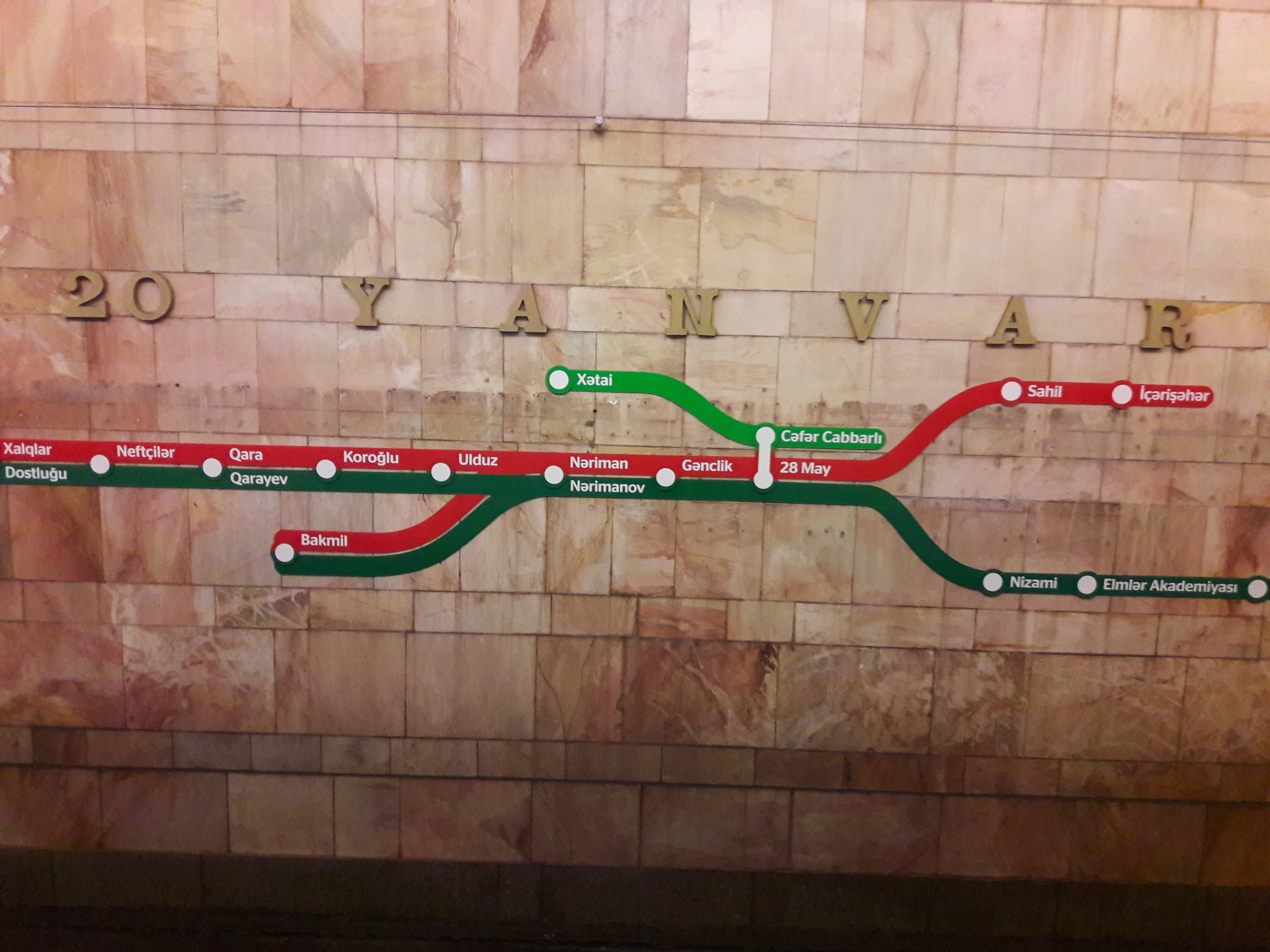

General information
- Location: Baku, Azerbaijan
- Coordinates: 40.24°N 49.4827°E
- System: Baku Metro station
- Owner: Baku Metro
- Line: Green line
- Tracks: 2
- Connections: 2, 7A, 7B, 9, 13, 14, 18, 29, 37, 61, 65, 67, 79, 83, 92, 102, 114A, 114B, 119, 130,142, 159, 165, 193, 194, 199, 205, 211, 508

History
- Opened: 31 December 1985

Services
Preceding station	Baku Metro	Following station
Memar Ajami towards Darnagul	Green line	Inshaatchilar towards Hazi Aslanov or Bakmil
Location

20 Yanvar (English: 20 January) is a Baku Metro station. It was opened on 31 December 1985. It was formerly called XI Red Army Square (Azerbaijani: XI Qızıl Ordu Meydanı).

== See also ==
- List of Baku metro stations
- Black January
