= Icheri Sheher (Baku Metro) =

Baku Metro Station

Coordinates: 40°23′43″N 49°52′56″E

Icherisheher İçәrişәhәr

General information
- Location: Istiglaliyyat str. 2 Baku, Azerbaijan
- System: Baku Metro station
- Owner: Baku Metro
- Line: Red line
- Platforms: 2 (1 in use)
- Connections: 6, 10, 18, 31, 37, 65, 77, 205 (future); Yellow Line

History
- Opened: 6 November 1967
- Former names: Baki Soveti

Services
Preceding station	Baku Metro	Following station
Terminus	Red line	Sahil towards Hazi Aslanov or Bakmil
Location

Icherisheher (Azerbaijani: İçәrişәhәr, Inner City), formerly known as Baku Soviet (Azerbaijani: Bakı Soveti) is a subway station on Red Line (Line 1) of the Baku Metro. It was opened on 6 November 1967 as one of the first 5 stations in Baku. Regular traffic started from 25 November 1967. The station was called Baki Soveti until 2007. In April 2007 station was renamed "Icherisheher" according to the resolution of Cabinet of Ministers of Azerbaijan. Icherisheher station is located nearby to Four Seasons Hotel Baku.

== After renovation ==
From July 2008 renovation of the station was started according to the decision of the Cabinet of Ministers. In December 2008 renovation was completed, and the station was opened on 29 December.

Pyramid shape has been used for the entrance of station composed of metal and glass. The outer height of the upper vestibule is 14 meters (as the height of Old City fortress). Former escalators (LT type) were substituted with “Viktoriya” in 2009.

The middle hall and both platform walls have been decorated with 16 pictures of ancient Baku made in France. A fragment of the Old City fortress walls is placed at the back side with the word “İçərişəhər” on it.

The single exit of the station is on Istiglaliyyat Street.

== Gallery ==
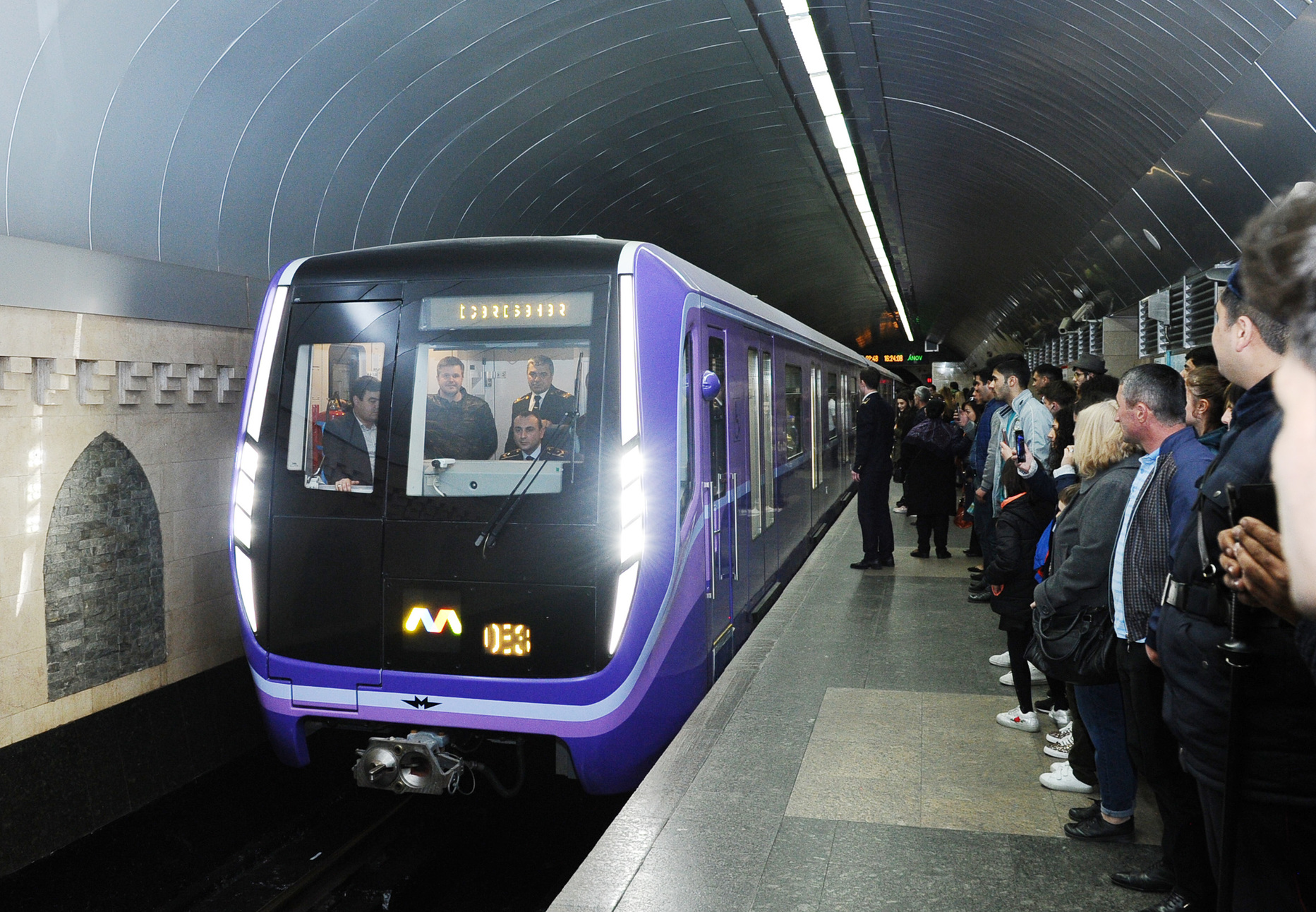
New train at platform, 2018

== See also ==
- List of Baku metro stations
- Old City (Baku)
