= Khirdalan =

Khirdalan Xırdalan
- City & Municipality
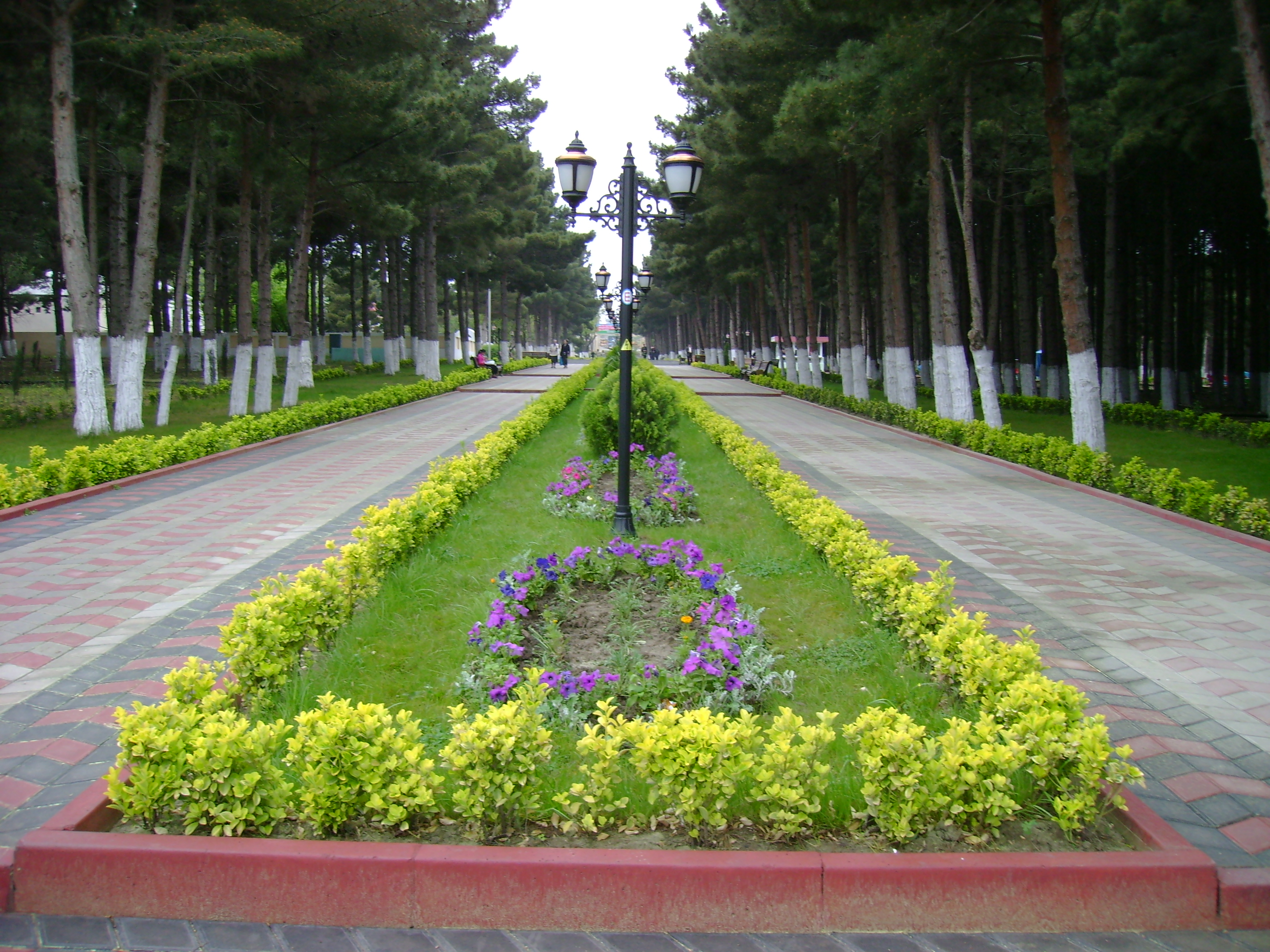
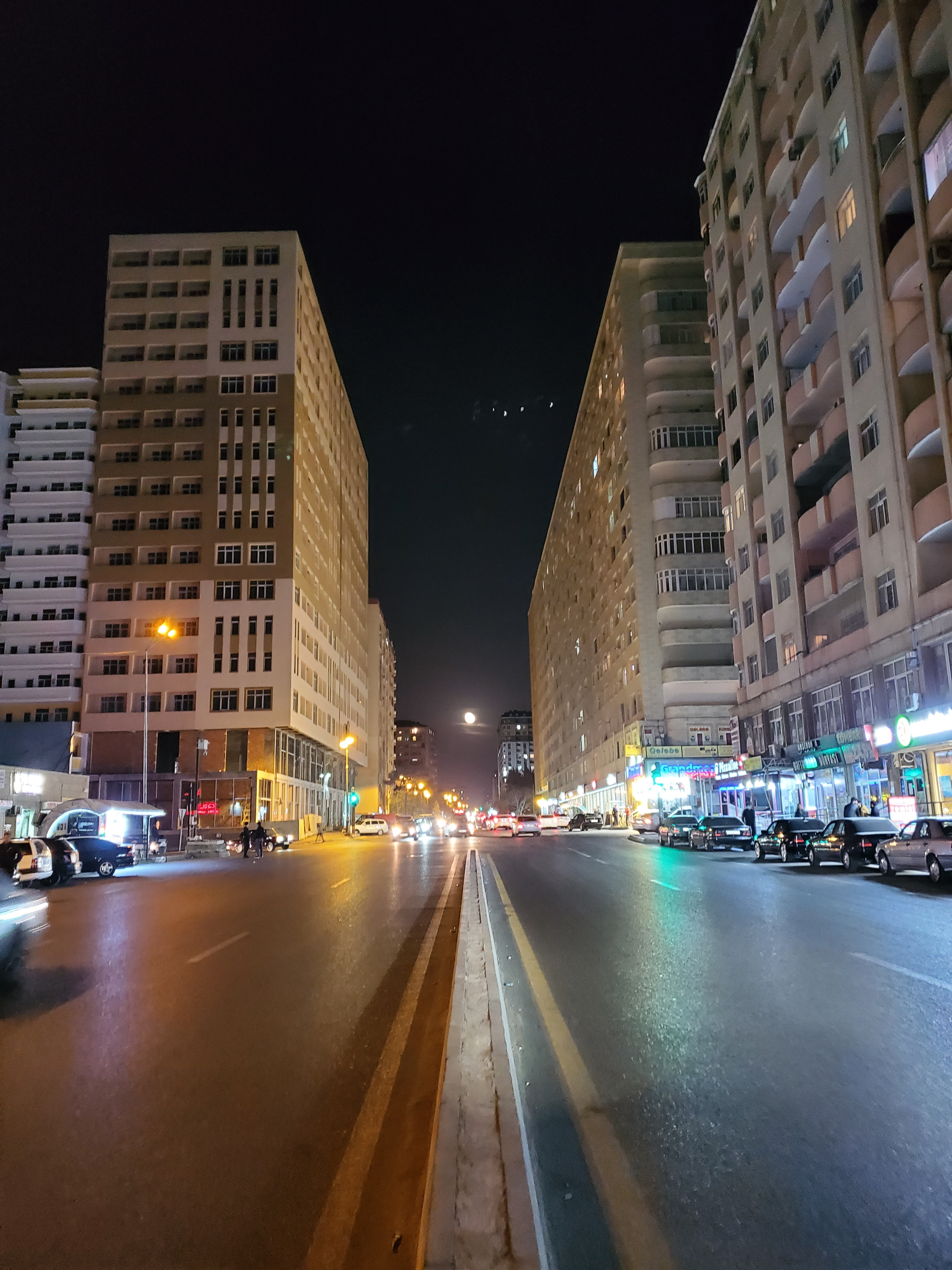
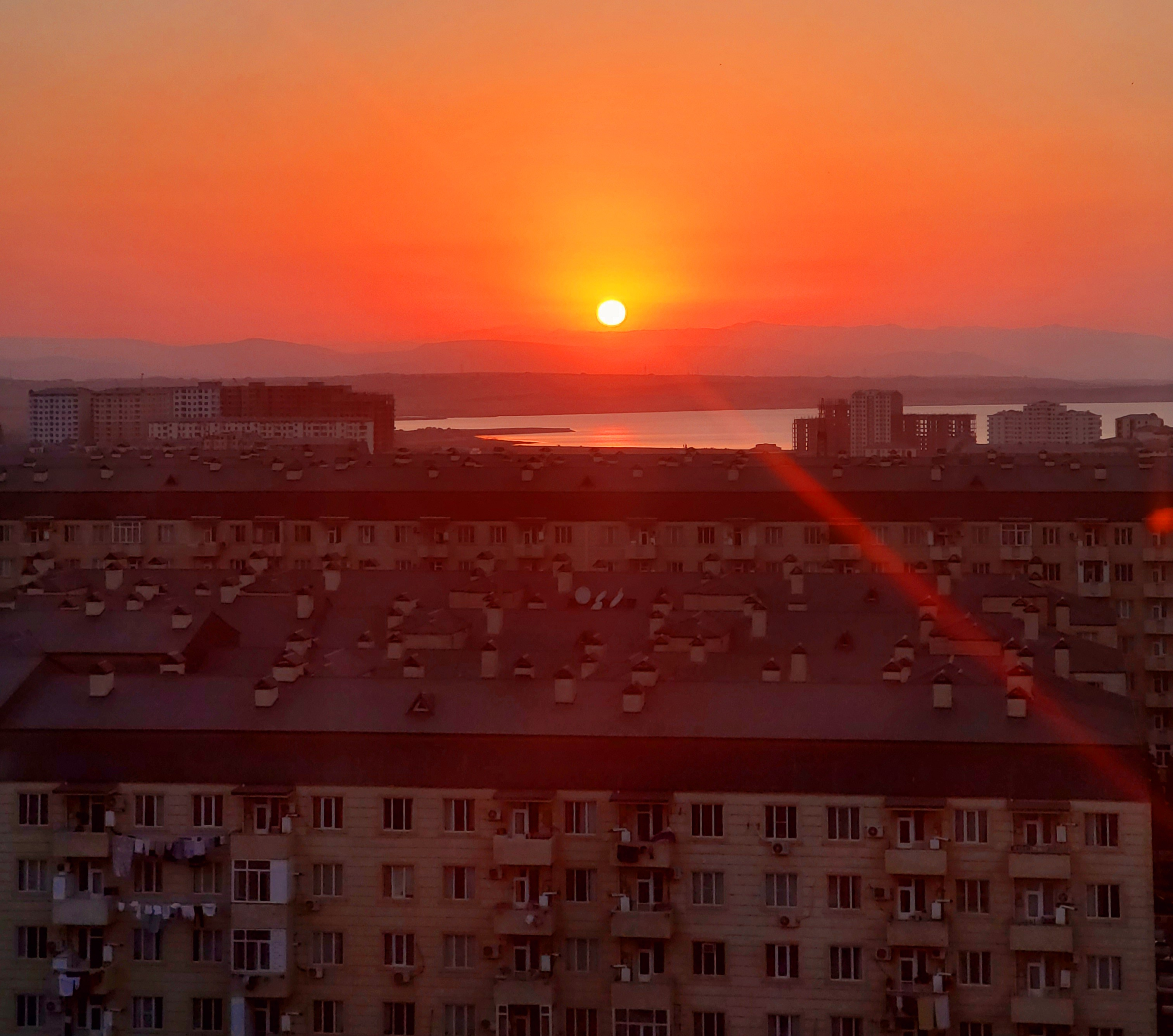
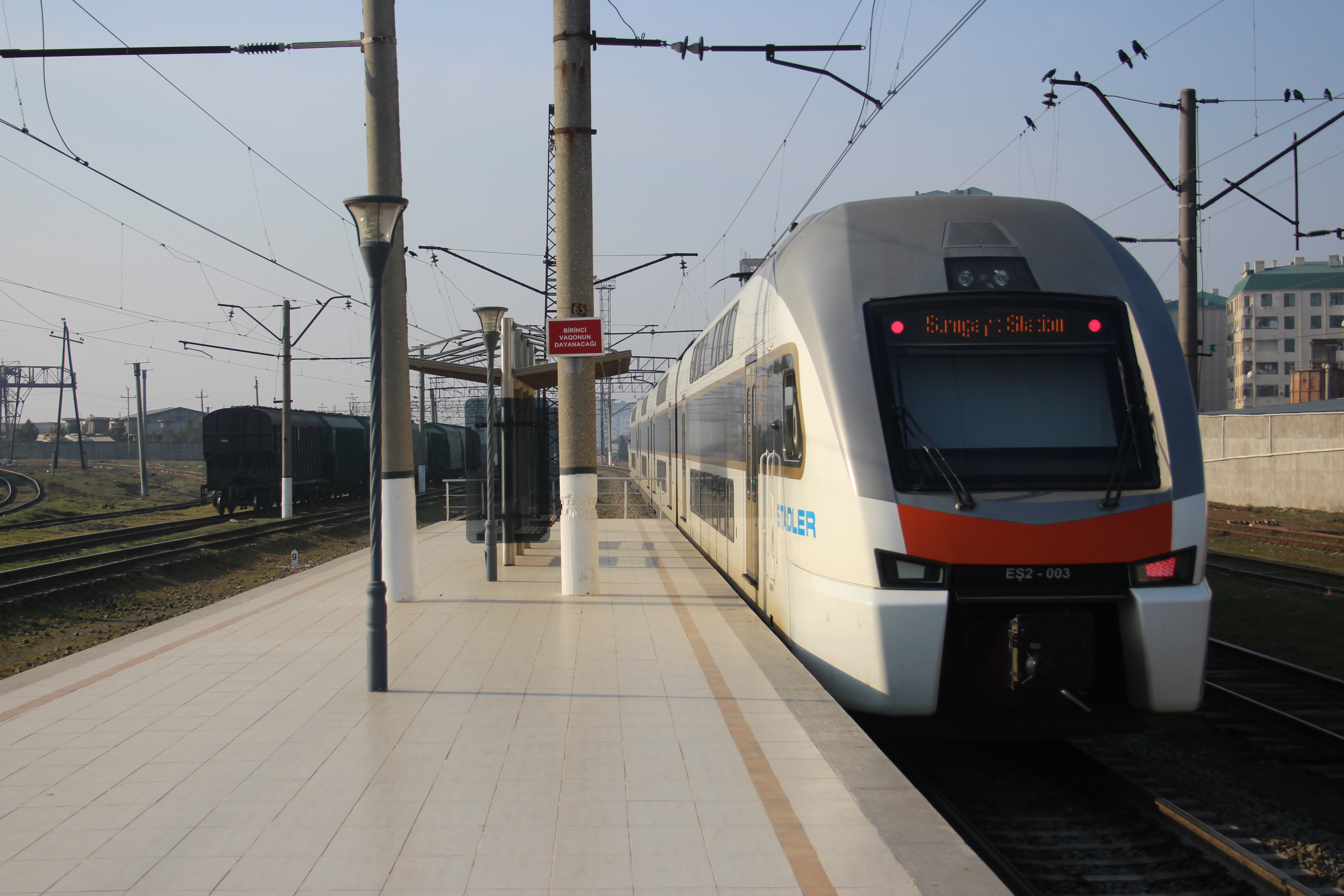
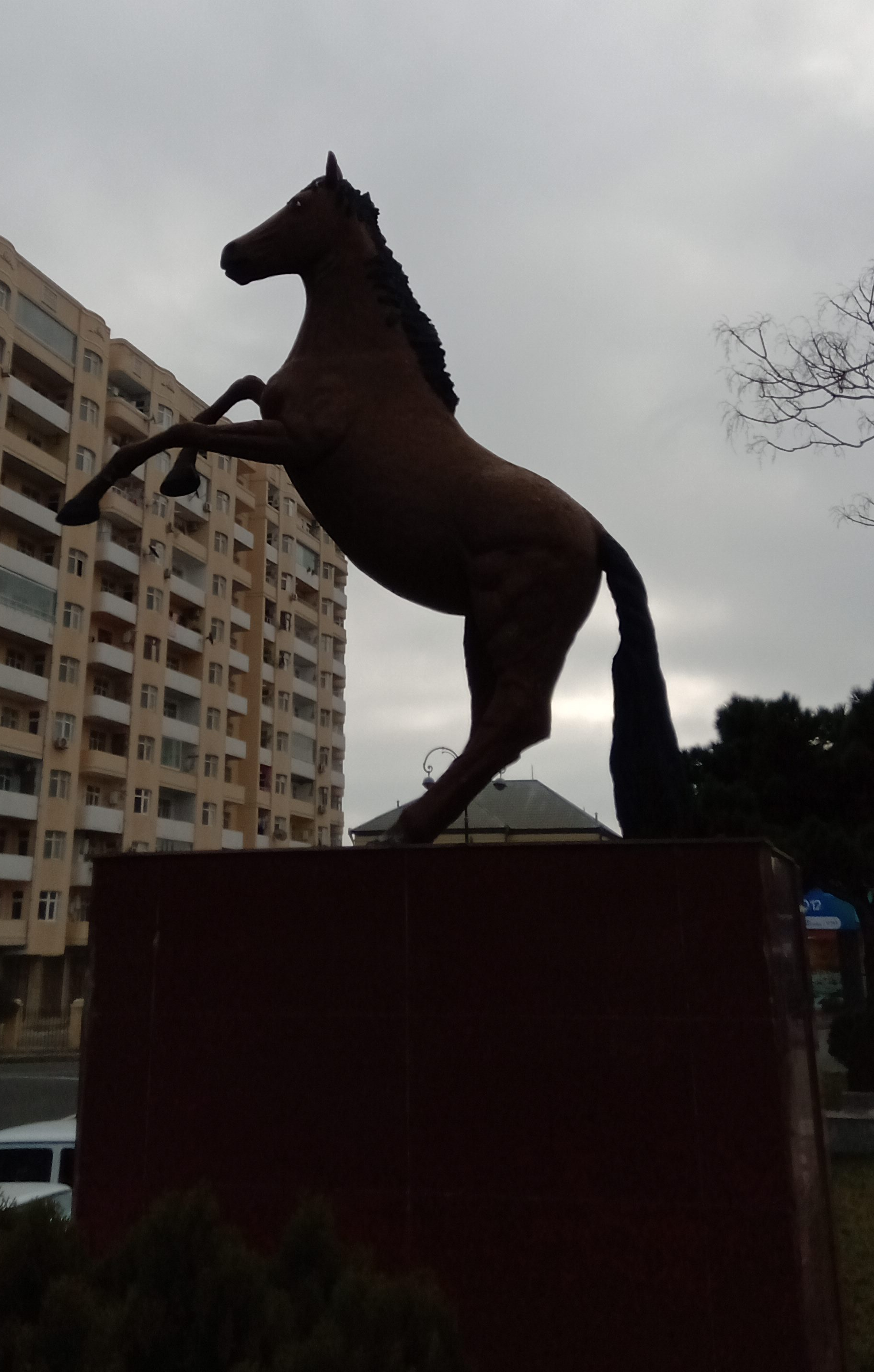
- Park in Khirdalan Heydar Aliyev ave. Jeyranbatan Reservoir Khirdalan Railway Station Equine Statue

- Location within Azerbaijan
- Coordinates: 40°26′55″N 49°45′23″E
- Country: Azerbaijan
- District: Absheron
- City Status: November 29, 2006; 19 years ago

Area
  - Total: 47 km^{2} (18 sq mi)
- Elevation: 50 m (160 ft)

Population (2024)
  - Total: 195,673
  - Density: 4,200/km^{2} (11,000/sq mi)
- Time zone: UTC+4 (AZT)
- Postal code: AZ 0100
- Area code: 12
- Vehicle registration: 01

Khirdalan (Azerbaijani: Xırdalan) is a city, municipality, and the capital of the Absheron District of Azerbaijan. The city is home to the country's biggest brewery, Baltika-Baku, formerly known as Khyrdalan. Khirdalan gained city status on 29 November 2006 after its approval by the National Assembly of Azerbaijan. A monument to Egyptian president Hosni Mubarak was erected in 2007 in the city. Similarly, a statue of Heydar Aliyev was erected in Cairo in 2008. In the wake of the 2011 Egyptian protests, the Azerbaijani opposition, led by the Musavat Party, demanded the demolition of the statue, calling it a "worship of idols". On 8 June 2011, the statue was taken down following Mubarak's resignation.

== Etymology ==
The name "Khirdalan" has various interpretations. One theory suggests it derives from "khir dali," meaning "a field from the sowing ground." Another interpretation links it to the word "khur," meaning "unusual fire." Some believe the name comes from a combination of "khyrd" and "field." It is also said that the name arose due to Khirdalan's location along a caravan route—where merchants traveling to Baku would rest in caravanserais and trade in the local market.

== History ==
Khirdalan is believed to have been founded as a village settlement in the early 14th century. The first inhabitants lived in an area called Kultepe, located about six kilometers west of the present-day city. However, due to frequent eruptions of the Kecheldag mud volcano, the population was forced to relocate. By the late 17th century, they resettled beneath Ziyiltepe, restoring and rebuilding Khirdalan.

During the 1930s–1940s, Khirdalan was administratively subordinate to Binagadi District. In the first half of the 1950s, Mashtaga was placed under Binagadi’s jurisdiction, and during the 1950s–1960s, Khirdalan once again came under Binagadi’s authority. Around the same time, approximately 10-15 thousand people resided in the settlement. On January 4, 1963, the Presidium of the Supreme Soviet of the Azerbaijan SSR designated Khirdalan as the administrative center of the Absheron district.

Khirdalan was classified as an urban-type settlement in 1936. On October 2, 2006, by Resolution No. 148-IIIQ of the Milli Majlis, 462 hectares (208 ha from Sulutepe and 254 ha from 28 May settlement) were transferred from Baku's Binagadi District to Khirdalan, now part of Absheron District. That same day, Resolution No. 149-IIIQ officially granted Khirdalan city status. According to the 1999 census, Khirdalan had a population of 28,576 people. However, rapid urbanization, which began in the late 1990s and accelerated in the early 2000s, has made Khirdalan the fastest-growing city in Azerbaijan. The master plan for Khirdalan, which sets the framework for the city's development until 2030, was officially approved on April 8, 2013. It covers urban expansion, infrastructure improvements, and zoning regulations to manage the city's growth effectively.

A multi-level overpass will be built to connect the M-4 Baku-Shamakhi-Yevlakh highway to the center of Khirdalan city. It is part of the "State Program for Improvement of Baku and Adjacent Regions' Transport Infrastructure for 2025-2030," approved by the President of the Republic of Azerbaijan Ilham Aliyev. The program implies improving transport connections of Khirdalan. Ministry of Digital Development and Transportation, Ministry of Internal Affairs, Ministry of National Security, and Ministry of Defence pledged to ensure that the road junction will be completed by 2025-2030. The road network will also be upgraded to connect Khirdalan with the M-1 Baku-Guba highway and the M-4 Baku-Shamakhi-Yevlakh highway for improved access to the border of the Russian Federation. These pieces will be completed in 2026. The project also includes building an overpass linking the M-4 Baku-Shamakhi-Yevlakh road with the M-1 Baku-Guba-Russian Federation state border road and passing through Hasan Aliyev Street in Khirdalan. The overpass will be done by 2030.

== Climate ==
Khirdalan is located in the western part of the Absheron Peninsula, south of the Jeyranbatan Reservoir, between Baku and Sumgait, at an elevation of 71 meters above sea level. It lies just 5 kilometers from Baku and is situated in a seismically active region, with an earthquake intensity of 8 points on the Richter scale. The city experiences a temperate hot semi-arid and dry steppe climate, with an average annual temperature of 13.1°C. The warmest monthly average is 24.6°C, while the coldest is 2.4°C. The humidity averages 76%, and the city receives 163 mm of annual precipitation. The predominant wind directions are north, northwest, south, and southwest, with an average wind speed of 6.8 m/s.

== Economy ==
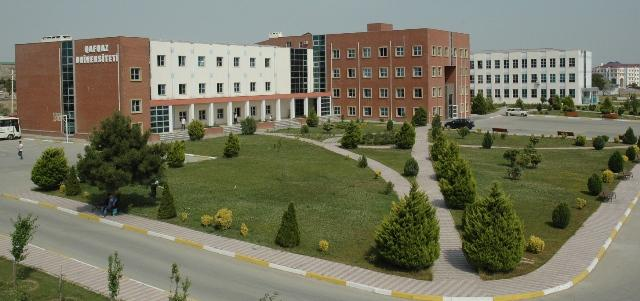
Baku Engineering University in Khirdalan (previously Qafqaz University)

The city spans 1,702 hectares and is home to more than 20 industrial enterprises. Khirdalan has a well-developed education system, with 10 secondary schools, 12 kindergartens, a centralized library system, and a local history museum. The Absheron District Central Hospital is also located within the city. Public transportation includes bus lines 135 and 119, which connect Khirdalan to Baku, and bus line 523, which operates between Khirdalan and Sumgait.

== Transportation ==
The Khirdalan Railway Station, part of the Baku Suburban Railway, was first opened in 1952, and passenger services were expanded on September 12, 2015, with the launch of high-speed Baku-Khyrdalan-Sumgait train services.

== Notable natives ==
- Nabi Khazri — poet, novelist and playwright, People's Poet of Azerbaijan SSR (1984).
