= Heydar Mosque =

Mosque in Baku, Azerbaijan

- Azerbaijani: Heydər Məscidi
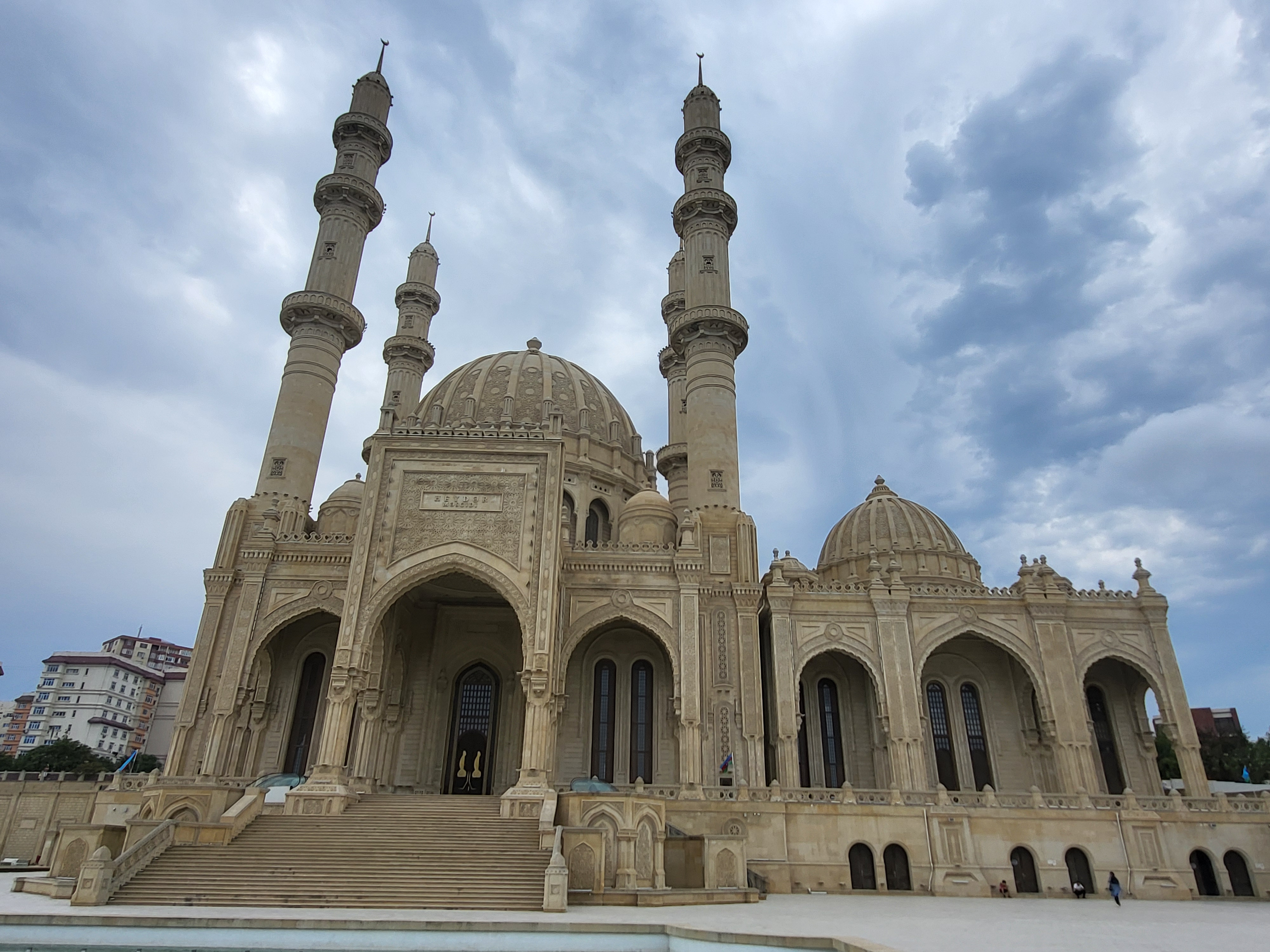
- View of mosque in 2019

- Heydar Mosque in 2025

Religion
- Affiliation: Islam
- Ecclesiastical or organisational status: Mosque
- Ownership: Religious Association of Azerbaijan
- Leadership: İmam Hafiz Abbasov; Imam Akhund Rufet Garayev
- Status: Active

Location
- Location: Binəqədi, Baku
- Country: Azerbaijan
- Coordinates: 40°25′45″N 49°49′28″E

Architecture
- Architect: Ədalət Məmmədov|
- Type: Mosque architecture
- Style: Islamic; Shirvan-Absheron
- Funded by: Government of Azerbaijan
- Groundbreaking: September 2012
- Completed: 2014

Specifications
- Capacity: 75,000 worshipers
- Interior area: 4,200 m^{2} (45,000 sq ft)
- Dome: Two
- Dome height (outer): 55 m (180 ft); 35 m (115 ft)
- Minaret: Four
- Minaret height: 95 m (312 ft)
- Site area: 12,000 m^{2} (130,000 sq ft)

The Heydar Mosque (Azerbaijani: Heydər Məscidi) is a mosque, located in the Binəqədi raion of Baku, in Azerbaijan. Opened on 26 December 2014, the mosque is named after Heydar Aliyev, a former President of Azerbaijan. It is the largest mosque in Azerbaijan and the Caucasus.

The Caucasian Muslim Office appointed Imam Hafiz Abbasov and Imam Akhund Rufet Garayev for the Sunni and Shia sects, respectively.

== History ==
The order to build the Heydar Mosque was given in mid-2012 by Ilham Aliyev, President of Azerbaijan, and the son of the mosque's namesake. Construction work began in September 2012 and was completed at the end of 2014. The official opening ceremony of the mosque took place on 26 December 2014. Those who took part included Ilham Aliyev, his spouse Mehriban Aliyeva, the Chairman of the Coordinating Council of the Muftis of the North Caucasus and the Mufti of Karachay-Cherkessia Ismail Berdyev, the Head of the Diocese of Baku and Azerbaijan of the Russian Orthodox Church Father Alexander, Chairman of the Baku Religious Community of Mountain Jews Melih Evdaev, Plenipotentiary Representative of the Office of Muslims of the Caucasus in the Russian Federation Shafik Pshikhachev and chairman of the Caucasian Muslims Office Sheikh-ul-Islam Allahshukur Pashazade.

The Heydar Mosque operates without a religious community, and is administered by the Religious Association of Azerbaijan via the Executive Power of Baku City.

== Architecture ==
The mosque site covers 12,000 m^{2} (130,000 sq ft) and the internal area of the building is 4,200 m^{2} (45,000 sq ft). Verses from the Quran are written on the side of the mosque's domes. The mosque was completed in the Shirvan-Absheron style and features four 95 m-high (312 ft) minarets and two domes, 55 m (180 ft) and 35 m (115 ft) high, respectively.

== Gallery ==
The mosque at night, in 2019

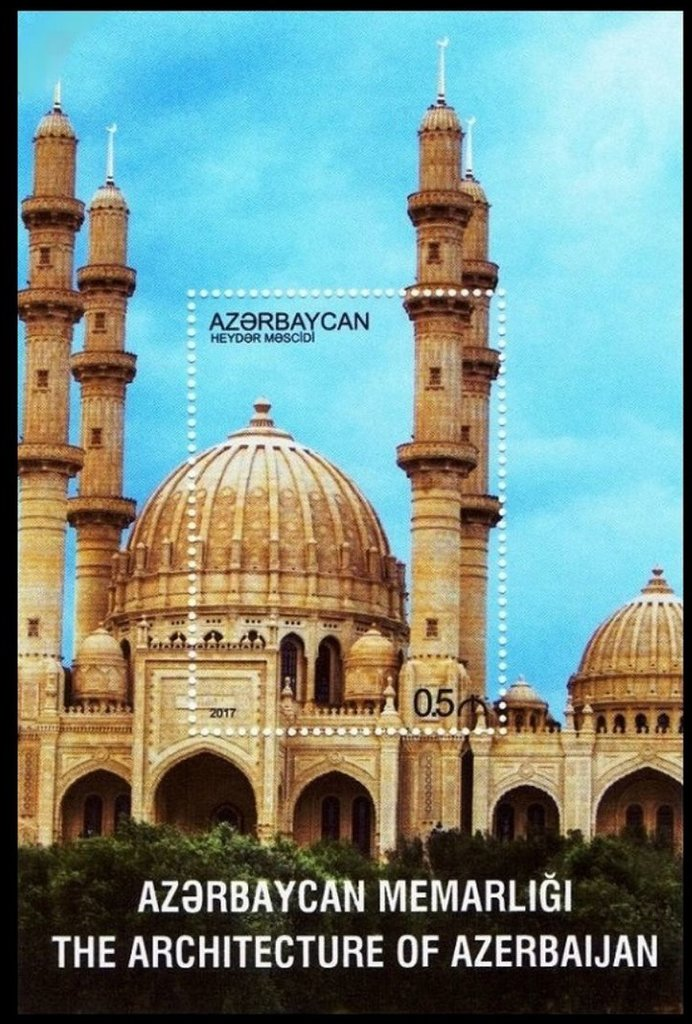
The mosque featured on a 2017 postage stamp

The mosque at sunset

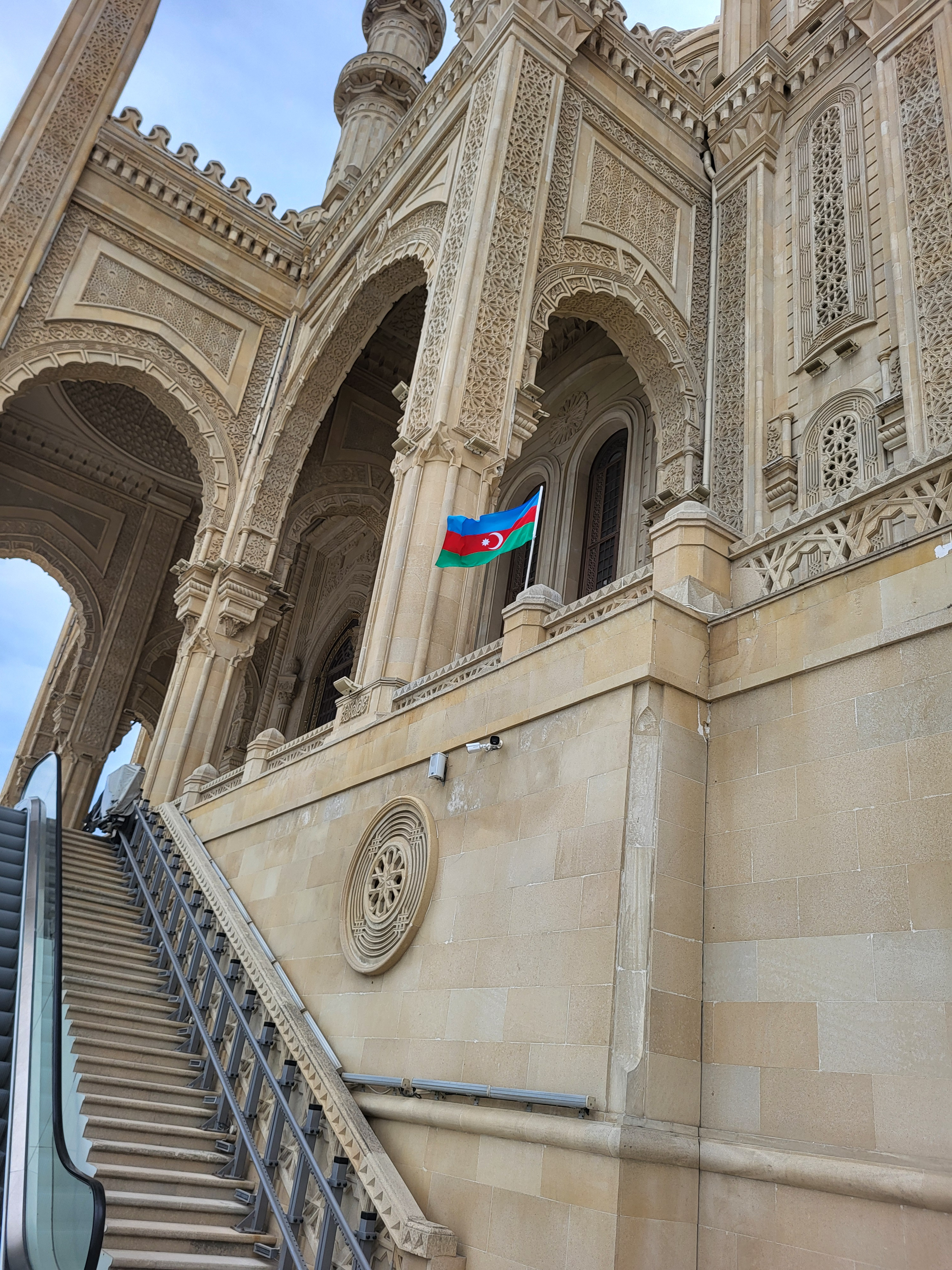
An Azerbaijani flag at the mosque

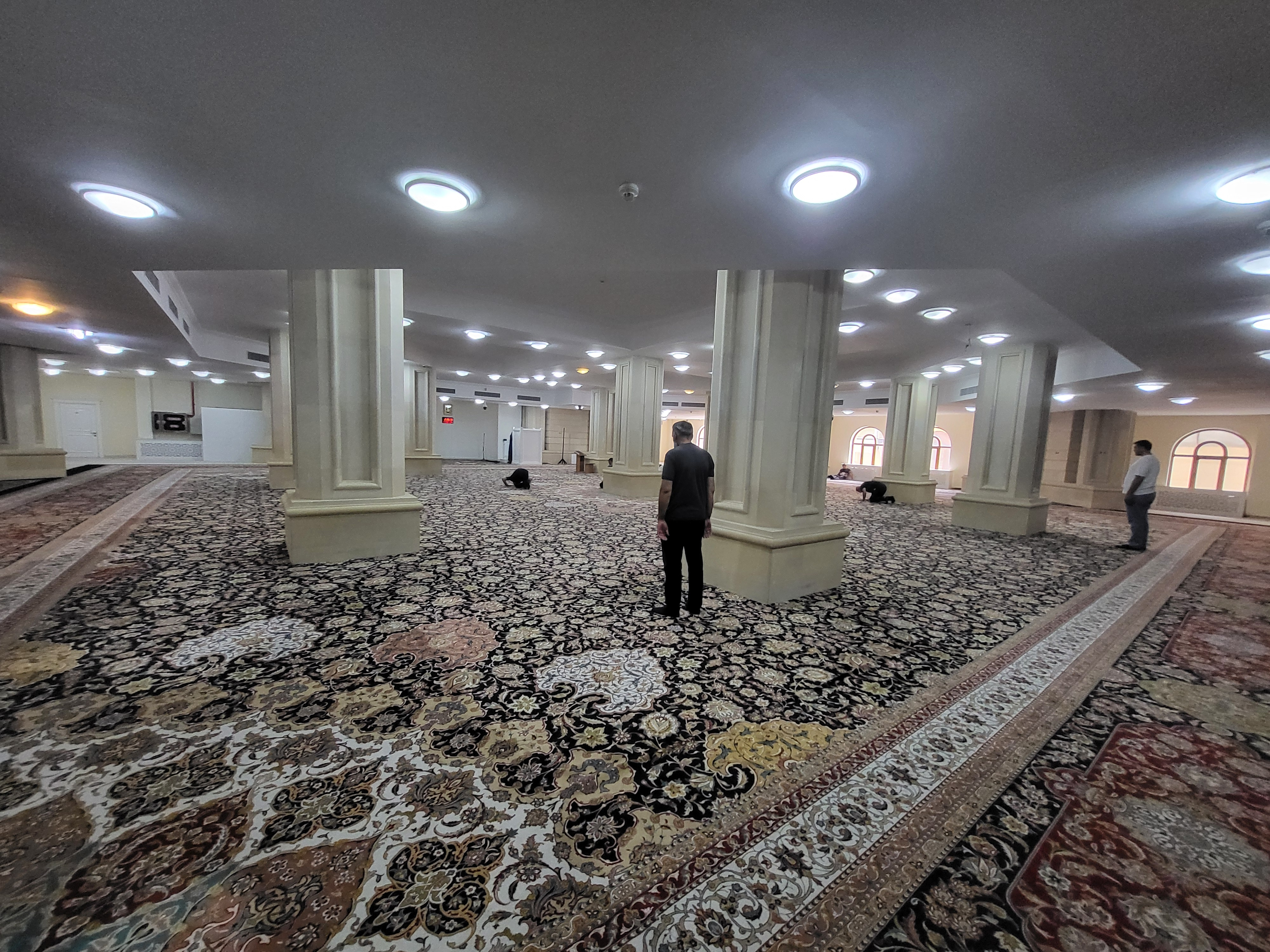
Praying area of the mosque (underground)

== See also ==
- Islam in Azerbaijan
- List of mosques in Azerbaijan
- List of mosques in Baku
