= HFF =

HFF may refer to:

== Film festivals ==
- Hamilton Film Festival, in Ontario, Canada
- Heartland Film Festival, in Indianapolis, Indiana, United States

== Sport ==
- Hallands Fotbollförbund, a Swedish football association
- Haparanda FF, a Swedish football club
- Hellenic Football Federation, in Greece
- Hocasan Football Federation, in Azerbaijan
- Hungarian Football Federation, in Hungary

== Other uses ==
- HFF (commercial real estate), a defunct American commercial real estate broker
- Housing Financing Fund, Island's government mortgage lender
- Human: Fall Flat, a puzzle-platform video game
- University of Television and Film Munich (German: Hochschule für Fernsehen und Film München)
- Hebi East railway station, China Railway telegraph code HFF
