= 28 May, Azerbaijan =

28 May 28 May
- Urban-type settlement
- Location within Azerbaijan
- Coordinates: 40°27′43″N 49°38′18″E
- Country: Azerbaijan
- City: Baku
- Raion: Binəqədi

Population (2020)
  - Total: 7,100
- Time zone: UTC+4 (AZT)
  - Summer (DST): UTC+5 (AZT)

28 May is an urban-type settlement in the Binəqədi raion of Baku, Azerbaijan. It is part of the municipality of Xocəsən.

== Population ==
The population of 28 May as of 1 January 2015 was 7,000 (including 3.7 thousand men and 3.3 thousand women), as of 1 January 2020, the official population of the village was 7.1 thousand residents (including 3.7 thousand men and 3.4 thousand women). The authorities of the Binəqədi raion estimate the actual population of the settlement (including the unregistered population) to be over 10 thousand inhabitants. 99% of the population of the settlement are ethnic Azerbaijanis, in addition to them, a small number of Russians, Tatars and other ethnic groups live in the village.
