= Heydar Aliyev's cult of personality =

Promotion of the former leader of Azerbaijan

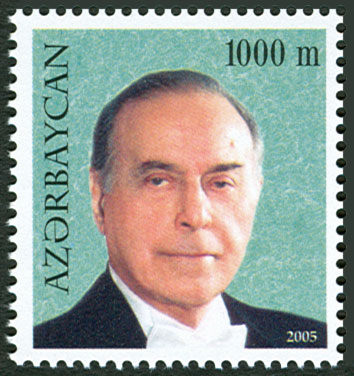
2005 Azeri post stamp depicting Aliyev

Heydar Aliyev's cult of personality, also known as Heydarism (Azerbaijani: heydərizm), became a significant part of Azerbaijani politics and society after Heydar Aliyev came to power as President of Azerbaijan in 1993 and continued after his death in 2003, when his son Ilham Aliyev succeeded him. Aliyev previously served as a former Soviet politburo member and the leader of Soviet Azerbaijan from 1969 to 1987. After becoming president, he then began to carefully design an autocratic system, with heavy reliance on family and clan members, oil revenues and patronage.

In Azerbaijan, Heydar Aliyev is presented as the "national leader of the Azeri nation".

== Heydar Aliyev's image in Azerbaijan ==
Aliyev has long been accused of violating human rights and forming an autocratic system in Azerbaijan, with many critics even characterizing the regime as totalitarian. His personality cult has been compared to those in the Soviet Union, characterized by an atmosphere of fear in Azerbaijan and censorship of the press. This continued following his death. According to Azeri analyst Zafar Guliyev, the 2003 appointment of Ilham Aliyev as his father's successor instigated a process of asserting the personality cult of his predecessor and rewriting recent Azerbaijani history.

In his 2003 book The New Great Game: Blood and Oil in Central Asia, German journalist Lutz Kleveman described the situation:

In his eight years of rule, the autocrat has orchestrated a true cult of personality. Pictures of leathery, sphinxlike Aliyev stare from the wall in every office across the country. The paintings with the caption "Shining Son of the People" show an amazingly rejuvenated president emitting red and yellow rays of light, while in actuality eighty-year-old Aliyev is suffering from cancer and has long since chosen his son Ilham to succeed him as president.

Opposition analyst Zardusht Alizade has said that Aliyev "was the last representative of the political heritage of Stalin and Beria. [He] personified the most terrible experiences in the fate of the Azerbaijani people." The 2006 US Congressional Record Proceedings and Debates also expressed concern about how Ilham Aliyev's government maintains a "distinct Soviet-era state television network and has elevated Heydar Aliyev to the status of a minor personality cult figure."

American journalist and specialist on the Caucasus, Thomas Goltz wrote in 1998:

What I worry about Heydar's ultimate legacy. With the help of an oil-fed cult of personality that his mentor Leonid Brezhnev would envy, Heydar has managed to established himself as the personification of Azerbaijan—l'État, c'est moi.

Julie Hill described the cult in her 2005 book, The Silk Road revisited: markets, merchants and minarets, as follows:

Between a supermarket and a hardware store on a busy street close to the center of the town [Baku] is a poster that displays the portraits of Heydar Aliyev, Azerbaijani later president and, in the words of his son Ilham Aliyev, the current president, the "founder of an independent Azeri state". In Baku, signs of the emerging cult of Aliyev, who died in 2003, are everywhere. His portrait glowers from posters at traffic intersections. The airport, schools and factories are named after him. His bust is in public buildings. My first instinct was to think that the ever-present portraits were something of a slight to his successor. But it was apparent that the culture that Heydar had created now served Ilham well. The son took power after his father's death, and consolidated his control after a fraud-ridden election in November 2003.

The 2023 centennial of Aliyev's birth is also promoted by Azerbaijani diplomacy.

== Heydar Aliyev's reaction ==
In 2001, when journalists from CIS countries asked Heydar Aliyev about his cult of personality, he responded:

The people love me, I can't do anything with that. Not long ago, the chairman of the executive committee of the city of Ganja decided to erect a statue of me in front of the committee building. I called him and said that it's unnecessary. He resisted, but I told him "put a statue after I die..."

== Places named after Heydar Aliyev ==
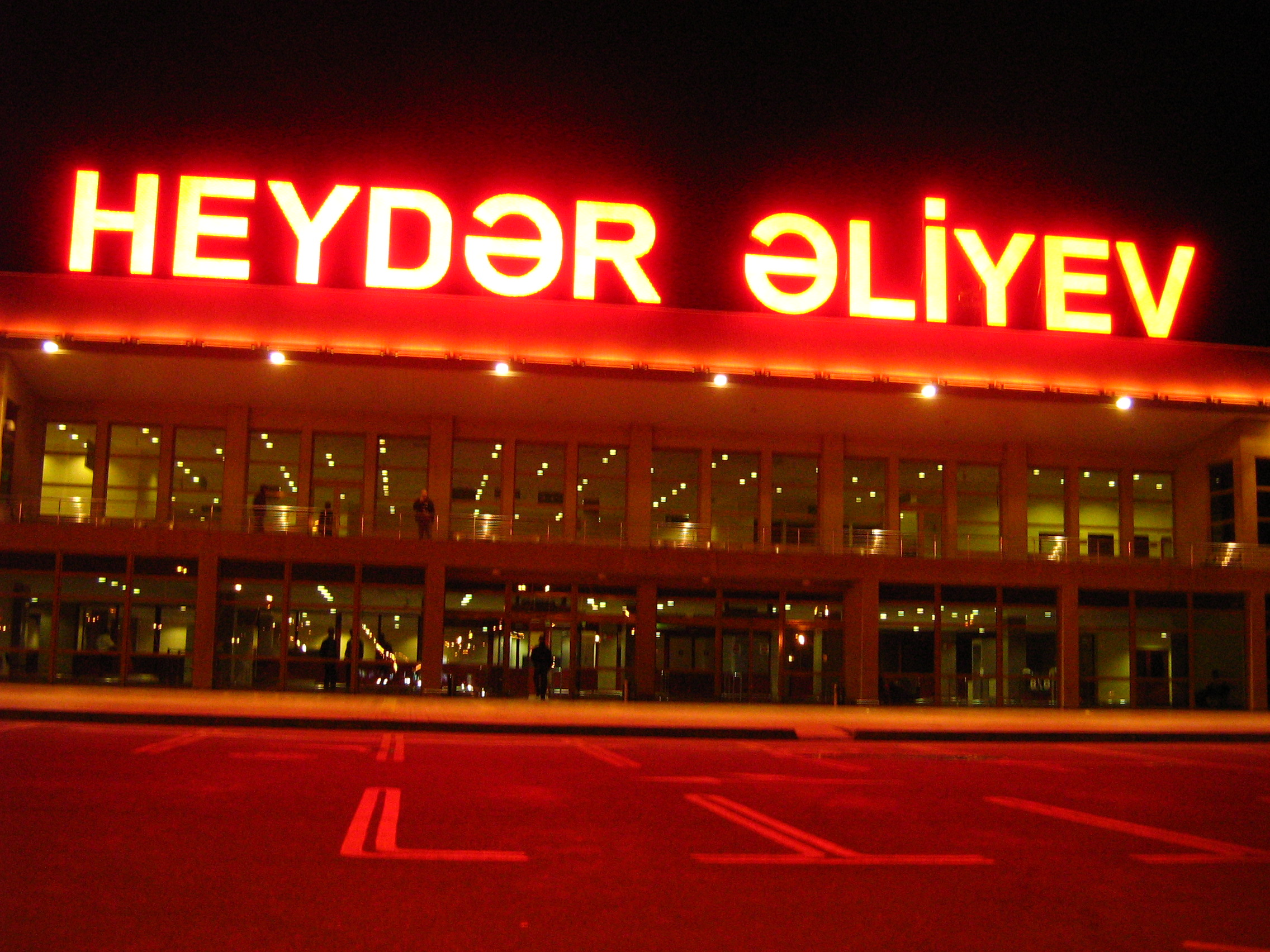
The Heydar Aliyev International Airport in Baku

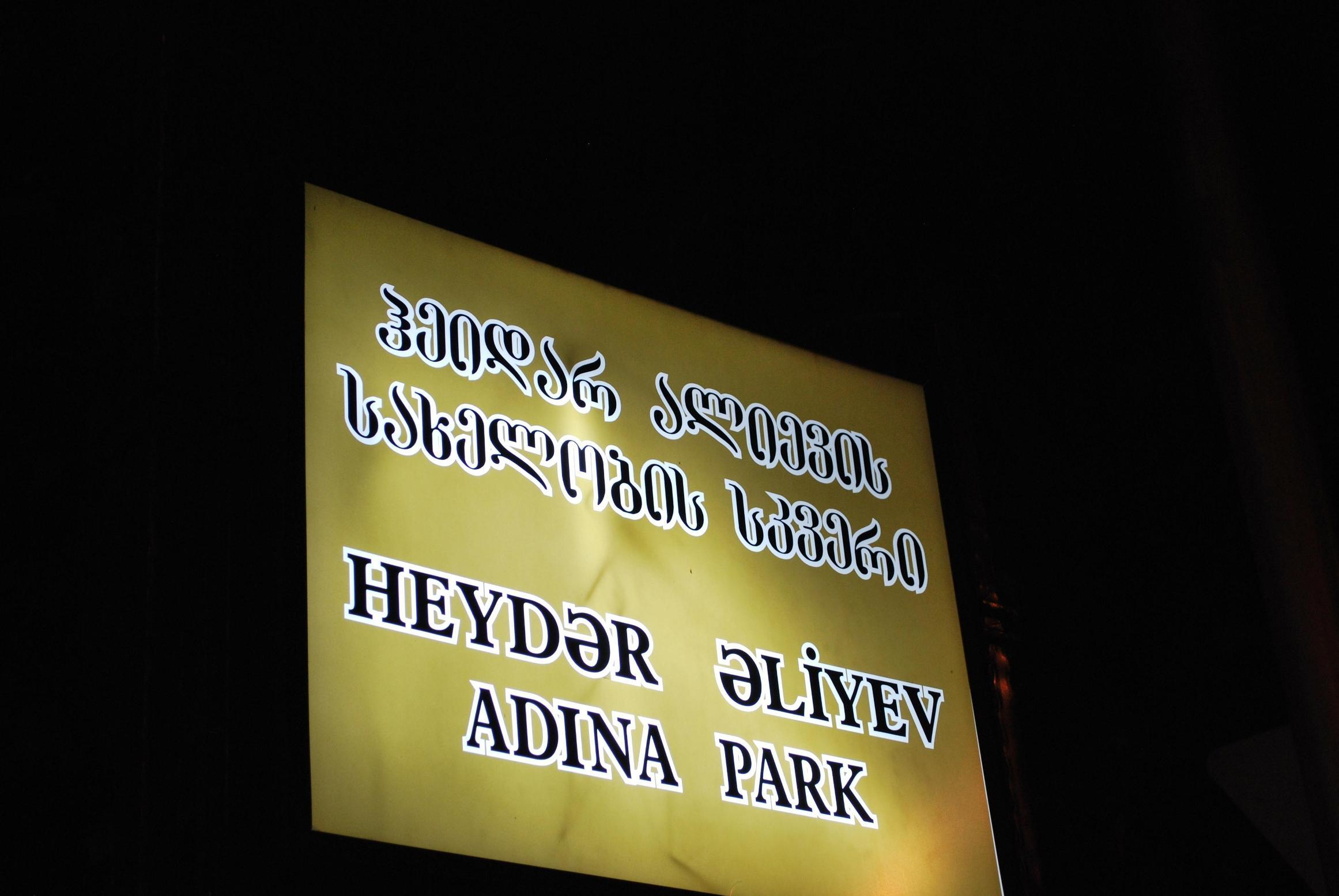
Heydar Aliyev Park in Tbilisi, Georgia

Every city and town in Azerbaijan has a street named after Heydar Aliyev, including one of the central avenues of the capital Baku. According to official information, there are 60 Heydar Aliyev museums and centers in Azerbaijan.

Other places named after him include:

- Baku International Airport, named after Heydar Aliyev on 10 March 2004.
- Heydar Aliyev Sports and Exhibition Complex, Baku
- Ministry of National Security Academy in Baku (ru)
- Heydar Aliyev Cultural Center
- Heydar Mosque in Baku (opened in 2014)
- Baku Oil Refinery (ru)
- The Baku factory of Deepwater Bases
- Heydar Aliyev Georgia-Azerbaijan Humanitarian University, an independent university in Marneuli, Georgia (opened in 2008)

=== Outside of Azerbaijan ===
- 2004 – forest in Ankara, Turkey
- 2004 – street in Astana, Kazakhstan
- 2006 – park in Istanbul, Turkey
- 2007 – square in Tbilisi, Georgia
- 2007 – park in Ankara, Turkey
- 2007 – park in Bucharest, Romania
- 2007 – avenue in Amman, Jordan
- 2008 – street in Ankara, Turkey
- 2010 – forest in Foça, Turkey
- 2010 – avenue in Hadera, Israel
- 2010 – square in Kyiv, Ukraine
- 2010 – park in Kartepe, Turkey
- 2011 – bridge in Tarsus, Turkey
- 2011 – school in Ankara, Turkey
- 2011 – lycée in Iğdır, Turkey
- 2011 – street in Malgobek, Ingushetia, Russia
- 2011 – school in Astrakhan, Russia
- Park in İzmir, Turkey
- Avenue in İzmir, Turkey
- Boulevard in İzmir, Turkey
- High school in Aliağa, Turkey

On 14 June 2005, a commemorative plaque was opened in Saint Petersburg, Russia on 6 Gorokhovaya Street, near the house where Aliyev lived from 1949 to 1950.

== Other ==
The Heydar Aliyev Order, founded in 2004, is the supreme order of the Azerbaijan Republic.

=== Gül bayramı ===
Annually, since 2000, a festival is held in Baku in honor of Heydar Aliyev, called Gül bayramı, which translates to "Flower Feast". It starts on 10 May and lasts a few days. Traditionally, it is held in Heydar Aliyev Park, in front of the Central Bank of Azerbaijan, where unique flowers from around the world are gathered. According to the opposition Yeni Musavat newspaper, over $76 million were spent in 2013 on this festival.

=== Films ===
Two films were shot in 2003 commemorating Aliyev's 80th birthday. Black Label (Qara nişanə) was directed by Vagif Mustafayev with Polish actor Tadeusz Huk (pl) playing Aliyev's role. The Moment of Truth was directed by Ramiz Fataliyev (ru) with Russian actor Aleksandr Baluyev (ru) playing the lead role.

=== Post stamps ===
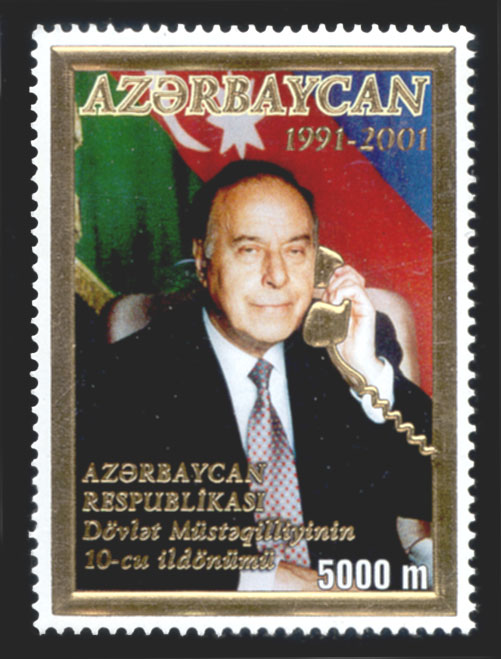
2001

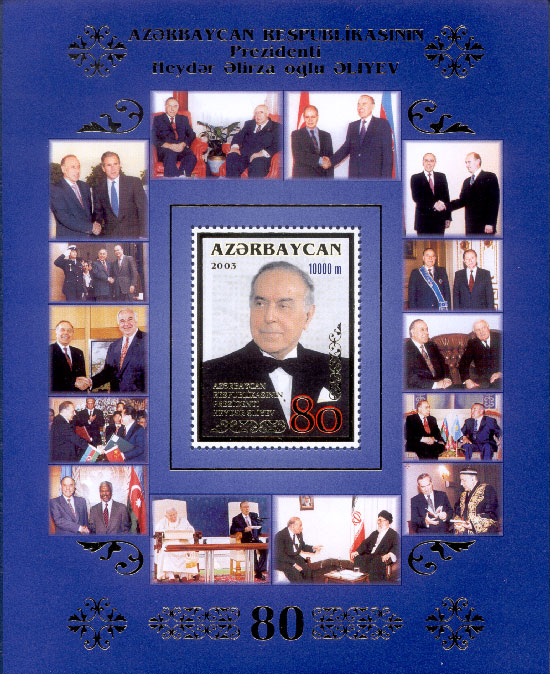
2003

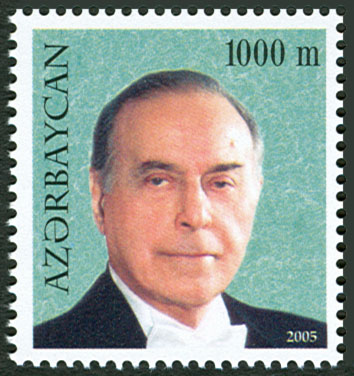
2005

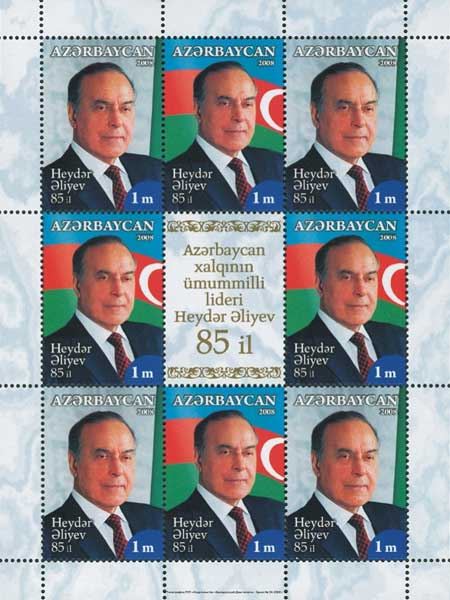
2008

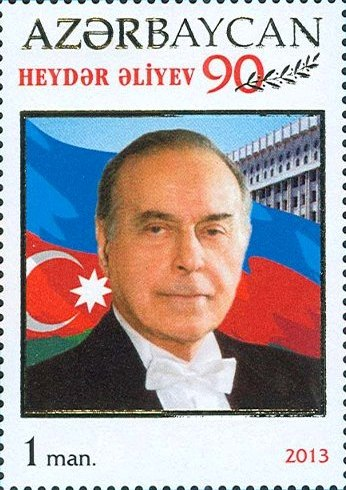
2013

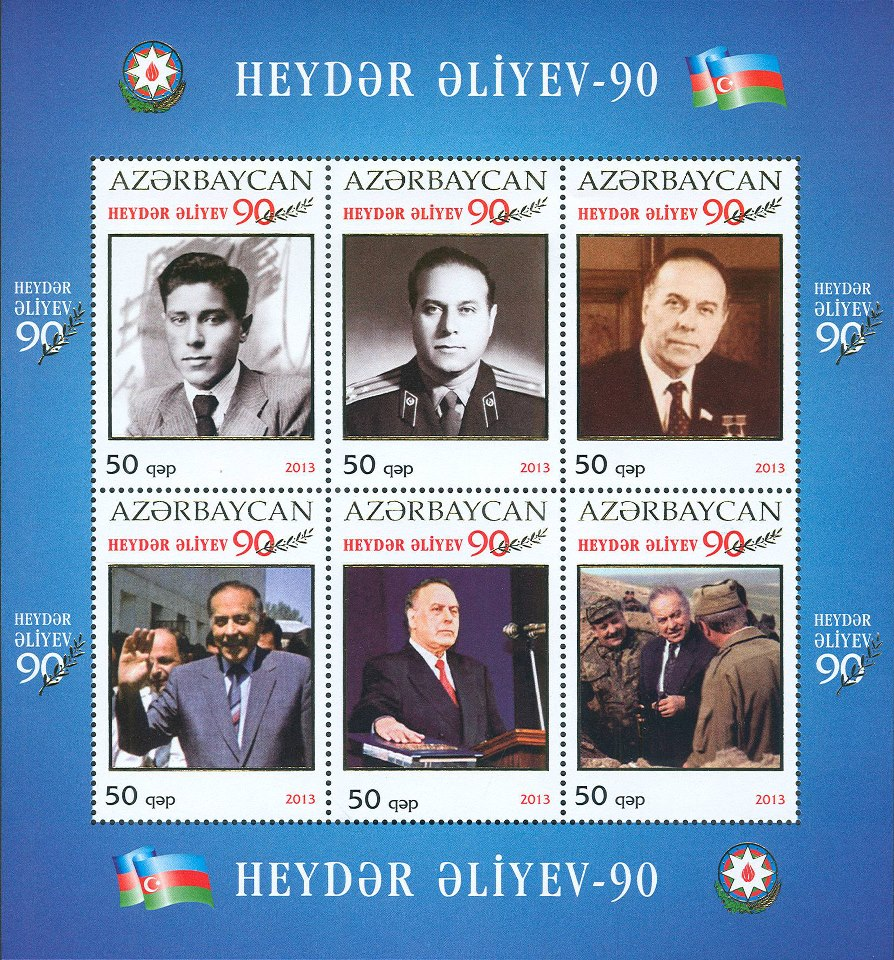
2013

== Statues and monuments ==
Incomplete map of settlements in Azerbaijan with statues of Heydar Aliyev

=== In Azerbaijan ===
Almost every major Azerbaijani city has at least one monument of Heydar Aliyev. Following his death in 2003, many more were erected in Azerbaijan and in other countries, especially in post-Soviet states.

In the capital Baku, there are at least three Heydar Aliyev statues: at Heydar Aliyev International Airport, at the Alley of Honor and in Heydar Aliyev Park on Rashid Behbudov Street.

Settlements in Azerbaijan with statues and monuments of Heydar Aliyev include:

- Ağcabədi
- Ağdaş
- Agsu
- Astara
- Biləsuvar
- Cəlilabad
- Daşkəsən
- Ganja
- Goranboy
- Horadiz
- İmişli
- İvanovka
- Lankaran
- Lerik
- Masallı
- Naftalan
- Nəbiağalı
- Nakhichevan City
- Oğuz
- Qabala
- Qazax
- Qax
- Qıvraq
- Qobustan
- Quba
- Qusar
- Quzanlı
- Saatlı
- Sabirabad
- Salyan
- Şabran
- Şamaxı
- Şəki
- Şəmkir
- Shirvan
- Siyəzən
- Sumqayit
- Tovuz
- Ucar
- Xaçmaz
- Xızı
- Xırdalan
- Yardımlı

=== Outside of Azerbaijan ===
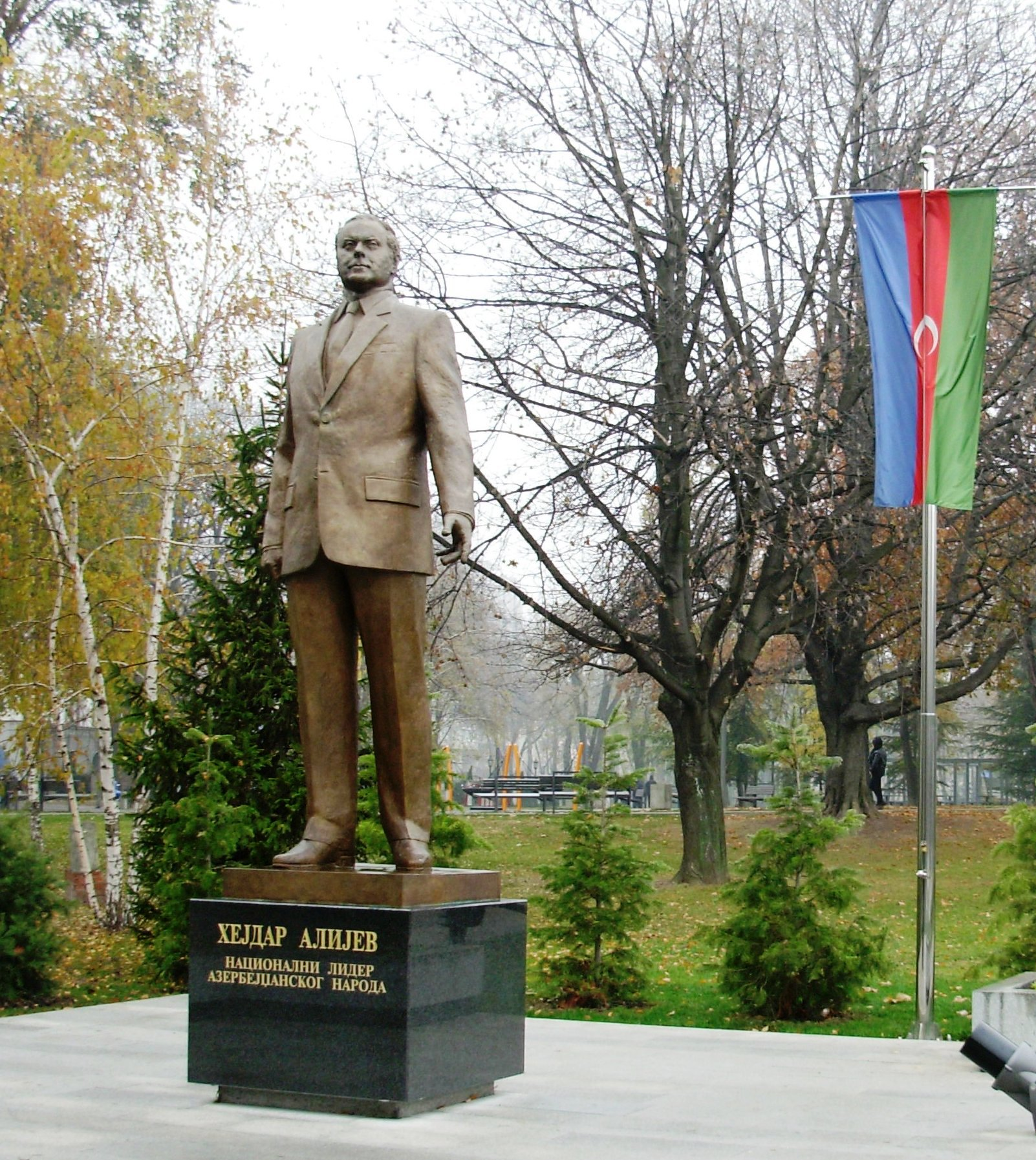
Aliyev's statue in Belgrade

Since Aliyev's death in 2003, many statues have been erected outside of Azerbaijan as well.

The first statue of Aliyev outside Azerbaijan was inaugurated in Kyiv (2004). That same year, a bust of Aliyev was inaugurated in Bucharest, in a park named after him in 2007. Later statues were erected in Comrat, Gagauzia, Moldova (2007), Tbilisi (2007) Qalyub, a suburb of Cairo (2008) Belgrade's Tašmajdan Park (2011) and Mexico City (2012). However, the latter was removed in 2013 following significant controversy.

In only two years, three statues of Aliyev were erected in Russia: in Ulyanovsk (2009), Dzhemikent village, Derbentsky District, Dagestan (2010) and Astrakhan (2010).

Statues of Aliyev were also installed in four Turkish cities: Kars (2007), Ankara, Istanbul's Haydar Aliyev Park, and İzmir (2018). A bust of Aliyev was inaugurated in Tashkent, Uzbekistan in 2018.

== See also ==
- Heydar Aliyev
- Ilham Aliyev
- Cult of personality
