= Sulutəpə =

Sulutepe Azerbaijani: Sulutəpə
- Location within Azerbaijan
- Coordinates: 40°26′N 49°46′E
- Country: Azerbaijan
- City: Baku
- Raion: Binagadi
- Municipality: Bilajary

Population (2008)
  - Total: 2,637
- Time zone: UTC+4 (AZT)
  - Summer (DST): UTC+5 (AZT)

Sulutepe (Azerbaijani: Sulutəpə, also spelled Sulu Tepe) is a settlement in Baku, Azerbaijan. The settlement forms part of the municipality of Bilajary in Binagadi raion.

It is an unofficial township built up in the 1980s by rural migrants and refugees from Nagorno-Karabakh. There is oil there, and oil wells, on the land occupied by residents, ownership being claimed by "Binagadi Oil", which is, in turn, owned by the State Oil Company of Azerbaijan (SOCAR) and the Company "Global Energy Azerbaijan" which is registered in the Virgin Islands. Attempts by the oil company to evict squatters and demolish illegal construction have been controversial with residents strongly contesting the oil companies claims. It was reported that on April 17, 2012 a mob of local residents attacked oil company employees demolishing houses and that the employees, in turn, severely beat a local Azeri reporter, Idrak Abbasov, while he was filming the incident.
