= Nabi Khazri =

Nabi Khazri Nəbi Xəzri
- Born: December 10, 1924; Xırdalan, Baku uezd, Azerbaijan SSR, Transcaucasian SFSR, Soviet Union
- Died: January 15, 2007 (aged 82); Baku, Azerbaijan
- Resting place: Alley of Honor
- Citizenship: Azerbaijan
- Education: Azerbaijan State University; Leningrad State University; Maxim Gorky Literature Institute
- Occupations: Poet, playwright, publicist, translator, screenwriter
- Writing career
- Pen name: Nəbi Xəzri
- Years active: 1945–2007

Nabi Alekber oghlu Babayev (Azerbaijani: Nəbi Ələkbər oğlu Babayev; December 10, 1924 – January 15, 2007), better known as Nabi Khazri (Azerbaijani: Nəbi Xəzri), was an Azerbaijani poet, playwright, publicist, translator and screenwriter.

== Biography ==
Nabi Khazri was born on December 10, 1924, in the village of Khirdalan to an ethnic Azeri merchant family. His father, Karbalai Alekber Baba oghlu (1873–1933) was a merchant and the son of a Shia Muslim cleric. Khazri graduated from secondary school and began his career. After participating in the Second World War in 1942–1943, he worked as an editor at the editorial office of the "Communist" newspaper in 1943–1945 and worked as broadcaster at "Azerbaijan radio". At the age of 20 he was invited to the Union of Writers by Samad Vurgun. He studied at Azerbaijan State University in 1945–1947, at Leningrad State University in 1947–1949, and Maxim Gorky Literature Institute in 1949–1952. After completing his education in 1952, Nabi Khazri worked as a consultant at Azerbaijan Writers Union until 1957 and in 1957–1958 as a literary worker at the editorial office of the "Literature and Art" newspaper. He worked as the secretary of the Union of Writers of Azerbaijan in 1958–1965, the chairman of the Azerbaijan State Television and Radio Broadcasting Committee in 1965–1971, and the Deputy Minister of Culture of Azerbaijan in 1971–1974. Since 1974, Nabi Khazri was the chairman of the presidium of the Society for Friendship and Cultural Relations with Foreign Countries of Azerbaijan, which were renamed "The World of Azerbaijan" International Relations Center in 1992.

Nabi Khazri died of acute ischemic stroke at 10:45 am on January 15, 2007, and was buried on 1st Alley of Honor on January 16.

== Works ==
His first book of poems, "Prosperous Dreams" was published in 1950. Nabi Khazri was the author of "Years and coasts" (1969), "Caravan of the stars " (1979), "Generations-centuries" (1985), "White lightnings" (1986), "I swear on the soil" (1989), "The leaves of the plane tree" (1995), "The bloody tulips of the Century" (1996) and other books. Nabi Khazri's poems have been translated and published in many different languages. His literary translations have enabled Azerbaijani readers to get acquainted with poetry of the world. A book of selected works by Nabi Khazri was also published in Tehran in 1988 by transferring it to the Arabic alphabet by Piruz Dilanchi.

=== Filmography ===
- "10 minutes poetry" (film, 1965) (short documentary film) (author of the work)
- "Flourishing Absheron" (film, 1967) (television movie) – scriptwriter
- "Coastal Garden" (film, 1967) – scriptwriter
- "The Summit Cloud" (film, 1972)
- "I want to understand" (film, 1980) – author, screenwriter
- "Poetry is a universe for me" (film, 1984)
- "Nabi Khazri" (film, 1987)
- "The khazri of the poetry " (film, 2000)
- "Horsemen of Attila" (film, 2002)

=== The songs written to his poems ===
- Shovkat Alakbarova — "Dərələr" (Valleys) — music: Emin Sabitoglu
- Elmira Rahimli — "Mavidir" (It's Blue) — music: Emin Sabitoglu
- Zeyneb Khanlarova — "Gələrmi, gəlməzmi?" (Will He Come or Not?) — music: Zeynab Khanlarova
- Anatollu Ganiyev — "Pəncərəmə qondu çiçək" (A Flower Perched on My Window) — music: Tofig Guliyev
- "Qaya" Vocal Quartet — "Sən danışanda" (Səsini eşidirəm) (When You Speak, I Hear Your Voice) — music: Tofig Babaev
- Brilliant Dadashova — "Güllərim" (My Flowers) — music: Arif Malikov

== Awards ==
Nabi Khazri was awarded several orders and medals for his literary and social activities, including the highest state awards and orders of the Republic of Azerbaijan.

- USSR State Prize
- Lenin Komsomol Prize
- Azerbaijan SSR State Prize
- Order of Lenin
- Order of the Red Banner of Labour – 1975
- Honored Art Worker of the Azerbaijan SSR – July 30, 1979
- Shohrat Order – December 17, 1995
- Istiglal Order
- Order of Saints Cyril and Methodius (Bulgaria)

== Legacy ==
In 1972, a short documentary television film titled "Zirvə buludu" (Peak Cloud) was dedicated to Nəbi Khazri's work.
