= Hocasan Football Federation =

Governing body of football in Xocəsən, Baku, Azerbaijan

Europe
- Founded: 27 November 2014
- Headquarters: Xocəsən

The Hocasan Football Federation (HFF) is the governing body of football in Xocəsən. It organises the MSU Premier League. It is based in the Xocəsən region. In spite of holding championships, the list of objectives includes popularization of football in Xocəsən and football development on the whole. The major decisions are taken at the meetings of the Executive committee which is composed of the chairmen of relevant Federation Committees. The Observer of the Executive Committee is a chairman of Advisory Council under the President of HFF. The President of HFF takes part in the meetings of the Executive Committee. In his absence the Head of the Executive Committee presides.

== The HFF Structure ==
=== Leadership ===
- President
- Secretary General
- Head of the Executive Committee
- Security Commander
- Interpreter

=== Committees ===
- The Committee on organisation and implementation and regulation of the competitions-headed by Ismail Tahirli
- The Committee on Discipline and Control
- The Committee on Administration and Economy-headed by Muhammed ibn Yusuf
- International Committee on development and cooperation in Europe-headed by Teymur Khan Butayev
- Public Affairs Committee
- Committee on work with fan movement-headed by Zaur Jamiyev
- The Committee on Accident prevention

=== Public organizations ===
- Advisory Council under the President of HFF
