= Bilajary =

Bilajary Azerbaijani: Biləcəri
- Municipality
- Azerbaijani: Biləcəri
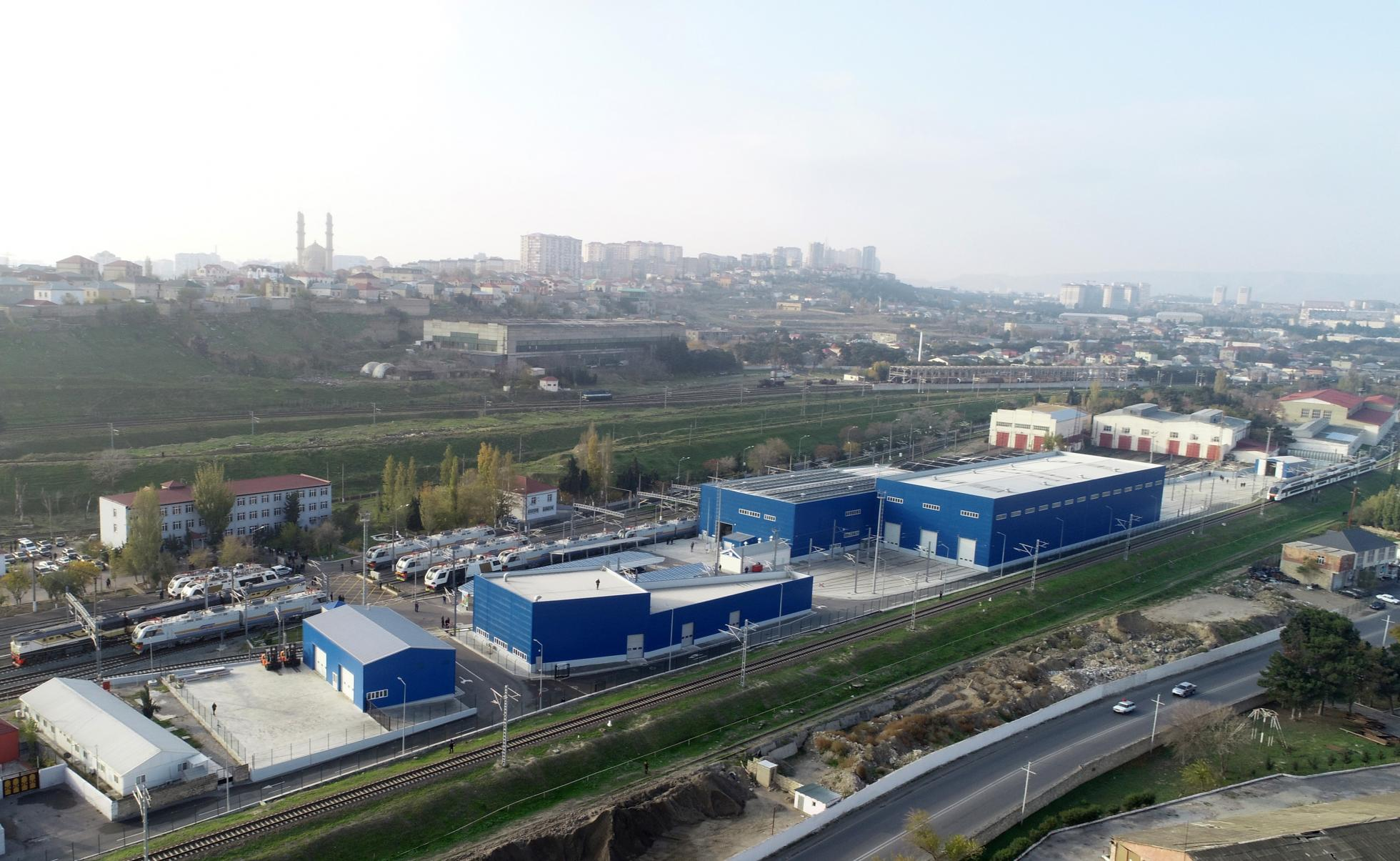
- Bilajary Rail Depot

- Location within Azerbaijan
- Coordinates: 40°25′53″N 49°48′29″E
- Country: Azerbaijan
- City: Baku
- Raion: Binəqədi

Population (2008)
  - Total: 45,008
- Time zone: UTC+4 (AZT)
  - Summer (DST): UTC+5 (AZT)

Bilajary (Azerbaijani: Biləcəri) is a settlement and municipality in Baku, Azerbaijan. It has a population of 45,008. The municipality consists of the settlements of Bilajary and Sulutepe.

== Transportation ==
Baku suburban railway

== Notable natives ==
- Agha Musa Naghiyev
