= Idrak Abbasov =

Azerbaijani journalist

- Born: c.03.05.1976
- Occupation: journalist
- Organization: Zerkalo IRFS(human rights)
- Known for: reporting on SOCAR, 2012 assault

Idrak Abbasov (born c. 1976) is an Azerbaijani journalist who works for the newspaper Zerkalo, one of Azerbaijan's few newspapers not controlled by the government of President Ilham Aliyev. The Guardian described him as one of the nation's "leading journalists". He lives in Sulutəpə, a settlement in Baku, the nation's capital. Known for his reporting on forced evictions in Baku, Abbasov was badly beaten in 2012, allegedly by SOCAR security personnel.

== Biography ==
Idrak Abbasov was born in a small village in the Talysh region.

=== SOCAR reporting ===
In 2011, Abbasov began reporting on protests against SOCAR, the state oil company, by Sulutəpə citizens whose homes were being demolished by the company. After he began his reporting, security personnel for the company sent a digger to destroy his father's home, damaging the roof and walls. In recognition of his work, Index on Censorship awarded him the Guardian journalism award in March 2012 for "investigative journalism of dogged determination across a range of media, including print, online, radio and television". In his acceptance speech, Abbasov acknowledged other Azerbaijani journalists at risk, saying: "This is the price that my colleagues in Azerbaijan are paying for the right of the Azerbaijani people to know the truth about what is happening in their country. For the sake of this right we accept that our lives are in danger, as are the lives of our families. But the goal is worth it, since the right to truth is worth more than a life without truth."

=== Attack ===
Idrak Abbasov has sustained numerous injuries while performing professional activity. The most serious of them were suffered in 2001, 2005, 2009 and 2012.

On 12 May 2001, Abbasov was hit by a police baton on his head while the police were dispersing an opposition rally in the center of Baku. (Craniocerebral injury, concussion of the brain)

On 9 October 2005, during dispersal of an opposition rally in the center of Baku, a plainclothes policeman hit Abbasov with a brass knuckle on his right temple and left side of the jaw (Craniocerebral injury, concussion of the brain, several teeth broken.)

On 20 March 2009, employees of the Ministry of National Security of Nakhchivan Republic arrested Abbasov by pulling a sack over his head, and for three hours the minister himself questioned him under physical and psychological pressure. (As a result, he suffered neuro-angina)

On 18 April 2012, while preparing a report about forceful demolition of houses by SOCAR in Sulutapa settlement of Baku, Abbasov was brutally beaten by a group of security guards of SOCAR. (fracture in the right eye socket, two ribs broken, craniocerebral injury, concussion of the brain, injuries to the left kidney and other organs).

On 18 April 2012, Abbasov was attacked, allegedly by company security officials and police, while filming a protest. His attackers beat and kicked him until he was unconscious. Abbasov was hospitalized with two broken ribs, a concussion, severe damage to one eye, and damage to his internal organs. Speaking later to BBC News, he alleged that the guards had intended to kill him, and had only ceased the assault when Abbasov's brothers came to defend him; Idrak Abbasov's brother Adalet Abbasov was also hospitalized after intervening in the beating. Another journalist reported being restrained and forced to watch the attack, which she said was 5 to 7 minutes in length. An aide to president Aliyev denied the journalists' allegations, saying that Abbasov had in fact been assaulted by "foreign special services", commonly understood to refer to agents of Azerbaijan's regional enemy Armenia. When interviewed by Index on Censorship on 11 May, Abbasov was still recovering from his injuries, but attempting to work from home, saying, "I’m a journalist. And I have three children to support."

The attack drew international attention. On 24 May, the European Parliament passed a resolution in support of Abbasov and another journalist, Khadija Ismaylova, who reportedly was being threatened for her reporting. The resolution called on the Azerbaijani government for an "immediate stop to all actions aimed at suppressing the freedom of expression and assembly". Human Rights Watch named the case as part of "Azerbaijan’s appalling record on freedom of expression", and called for "a prompt and effective investigation into the vicious attack". Amnesty International condemned that "journalists in the process of exposing human rights abuses are themselves coming under attack by state officials bent on preventing them from reporting the truth", and called for the case to be "thoroughly and impartially investigated".

The Guardian, The Daily Telegraph, The Independent, The Wall Street Journal, CBC News, and BBC News connected the case with the upcoming Eurovision Song Contest, stating that the spotlight it had brought to Azerbaijan, the contest's host, had done little to help the nation's activists. Abbasov himself commented, "I can't imagine what they will do to us after Eurovision. There are not so many of us."
