= Tatars in Azerbaijan =

Azerbaijani citizens and people of Tatar origin

Tatars in Azerbaijan are Azerbaijani citizens and people of Tatar origin. According to the 2009 census, 25,882 Tatars live in the Republic of Azerbaijan. This is 0.29% of the total population.

== Community ==
Number of Tatars in Azerbaijan according to the census
1926	1939	1959	1970	1979	1989	1999	2009
9 948	▲27 591	▲29 552	▲31 353	▼31 204	▼28 019	▲30 011	▼25 882

Tatars are mainly assembled in major cities of Azerbaijan: Baku, Sumqayit, Ganja, Khachmaz, Guba, Gabala, etc. More than 90% of the Tatar community lives in Baku. 25,171 Tatars live here. They are the third largest ethnic group in Baku after Azerbaijani Turks and Russians. Location of Tatars living in Azerbaijan by regions:

Şəhərlər	Baku	Sumqayit	Ganja	Mingachevir	Shirvan	Absheron	Aghdash	Khachmaz	Beyləqan	Guba	Lankaran	Siyezen	Gabala	Zagatala
Population	25171	116	52	38	4	57	4	131	24	63	13	18	10	11

== Religion and language ==
Tatars are mainly Muslims. They believe in Hanafi madhhab of Islam.

== Fellowship ==
Tatar communities in the Republic of Azerbaijan:

- «Tugan Tel» Society of Tatars in the Republic of Azerbaijan (Baku)
- «Yaşlek» Society of Tatars in the Republic of Azerbaijan (Baku)

== Celebrities ==
- Tajuddin Mustafin – the first mufti of Caucasian Muslims and Azerbaijan (1832–1840).
- Maciej Sulkiewicz – Head of the General Staff of the Army of the Azerbaijan Democratic Republic.
- Eldar Gasimov – Azerbaijani singer and musician. Her great-grandmother is Marziya Davudova, who used to play on the stage of the Astrakhan Tatar Drama Theater.
- Marziyya Davudova – Azerbaijani and Soviet theatre and film actress, People's Artist of the USSR and Azerbaijan.
- Firangiz Sharifova – People's Artist of the Republic of Azerbaijan
- Aliya Garayeva – Azerbaijani rhythmic gymnast
- Zemfira Meftahatdinova – The first Olympic champion of independent Azerbaijan (shooting).
- Dinara Gimatova – Azerbaijani rhythmic gymnast
- Ramis Alimov – Martyr of January 20, "Fighter for Freedom" (1992) and "Martyr of January 20" (1998) honorary titles
- Fargat Tukhtamishev – Martyr of January 20, "Fighter for Freedom" (1992) and "Martyr of January 20" (1998) honorary titles
- Khadija Gayibova – One of the first female pianists of Azerbaijan.
- Farid Khayrulin – Azerbaijani photojournalist.
- Hanafi Teregulov – Azerbaijani opera singer, baritone, theater figure and public figure, one of the founders of the opera choir in Azerbaijan.
- Aziz Gubaydullin – professor, writer, historian, victim of repression
