= Khojasan =

Khojasan Azerbaijani: Xocəsən
- Municipality
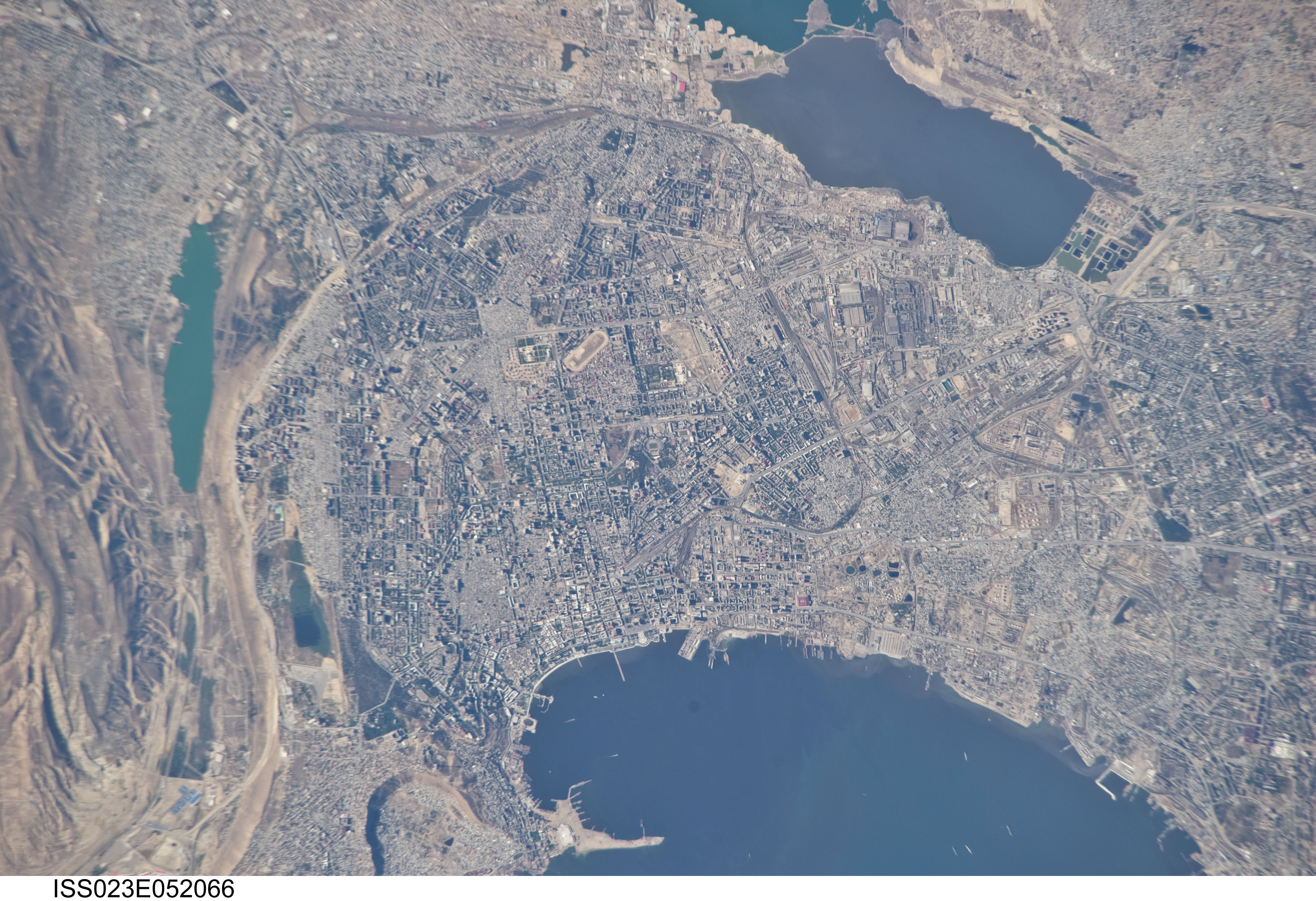

- Location within Azerbaijan
- Coordinates: 40°24′44″N 49°46′18″E
- Country: Azerbaijan
- City: Baku
- Raion: Binagadi

Population
  - Total: 5,100
- Time zone: UTC+4 (AZT)

Khojasan (Azerbaijani: Xocəsən) is a settlement and municipality in Baku, Azerbaijan. It has a population of 5,100.

== History ==
The name of Khojasan settlement was mentioned for the first time in V-VI centuries. Located on the ancient Silk Road, this village is called Khoja Hasan in some sources, and Haji Hasan in others.

Historical sources mention that this village was named after Khoja Hasan, a well-known merchant of his time who lived in the 17th century. Historian Sara Ashurbeyli mentioned the name of this village as "Khojasan" and indicated its meaning as a tax collection point during the Arab era. The back part of the village, located on the ancient Silk Road, is surrounded by the Gobu mountains, and the front part is surrounded by the mountains called Small and Big Stone. There were three tribes in the village: Yarahmadli (coming from Dagestan); shepherds (from black Siyazan); bathers (from Quba).

In this village, there are 3 ovdans (underground pools built to collect and store water). Although one of them - called Ortalıgh hunting ground - could not preserve its existence, the other two hunting grounds - Hökmeli hunting ground and Haji Rasul hunting ground located on the Hokmali road - have preserved their existence in the territory of the village. About a thousand meters north of the village (near the current "Pepsi" plant) was the ancient caravanserai of Shah Abbas. This caravanserai was used as a military unit until 1947. After the military unit was moved from there, it was blown up by the Soviet army with dynamite. The village also has an ancient mosque. However, the mosque is in a state of disrepair.

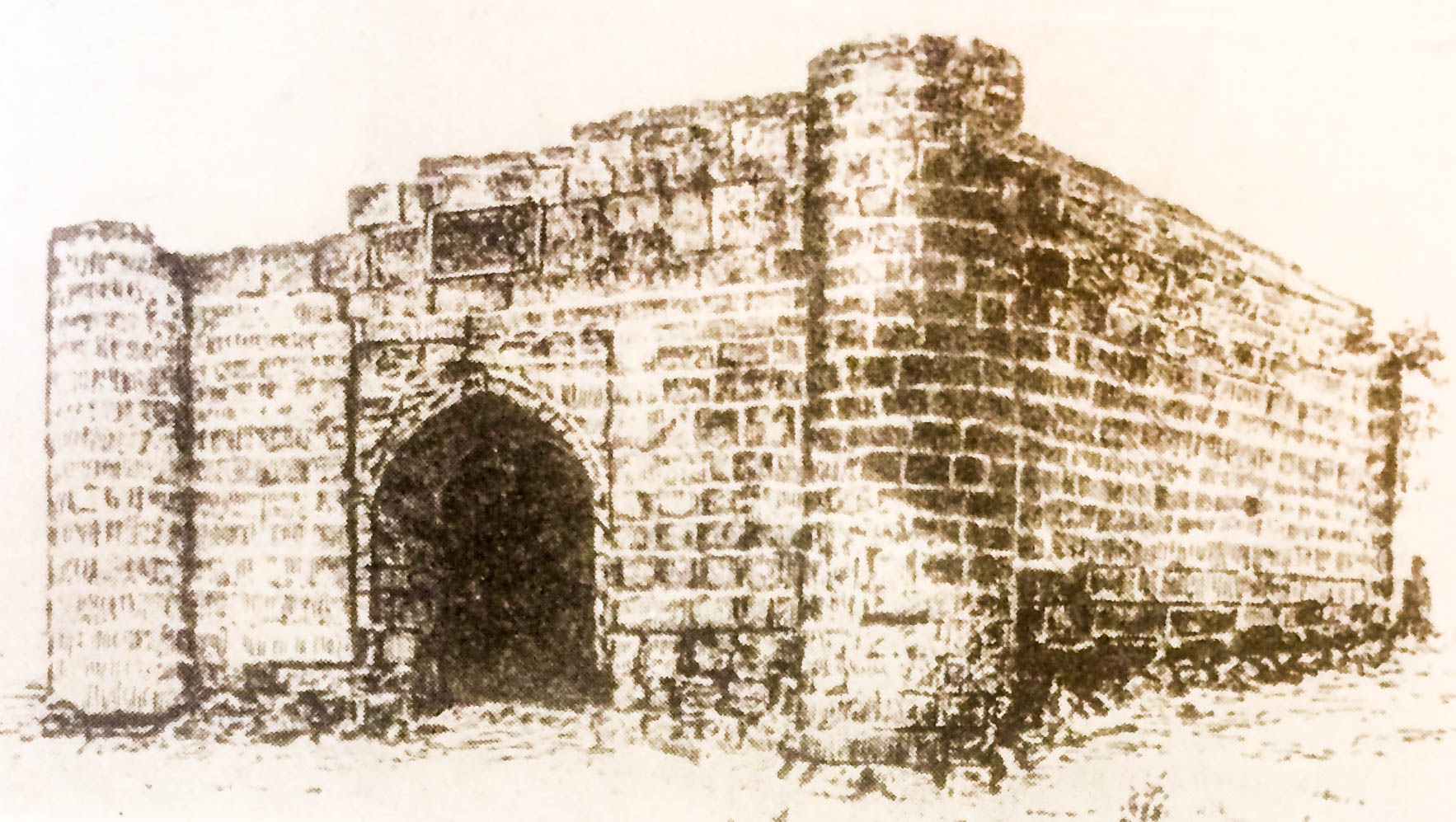
Khojasan Caravanserai

== Transportation ==
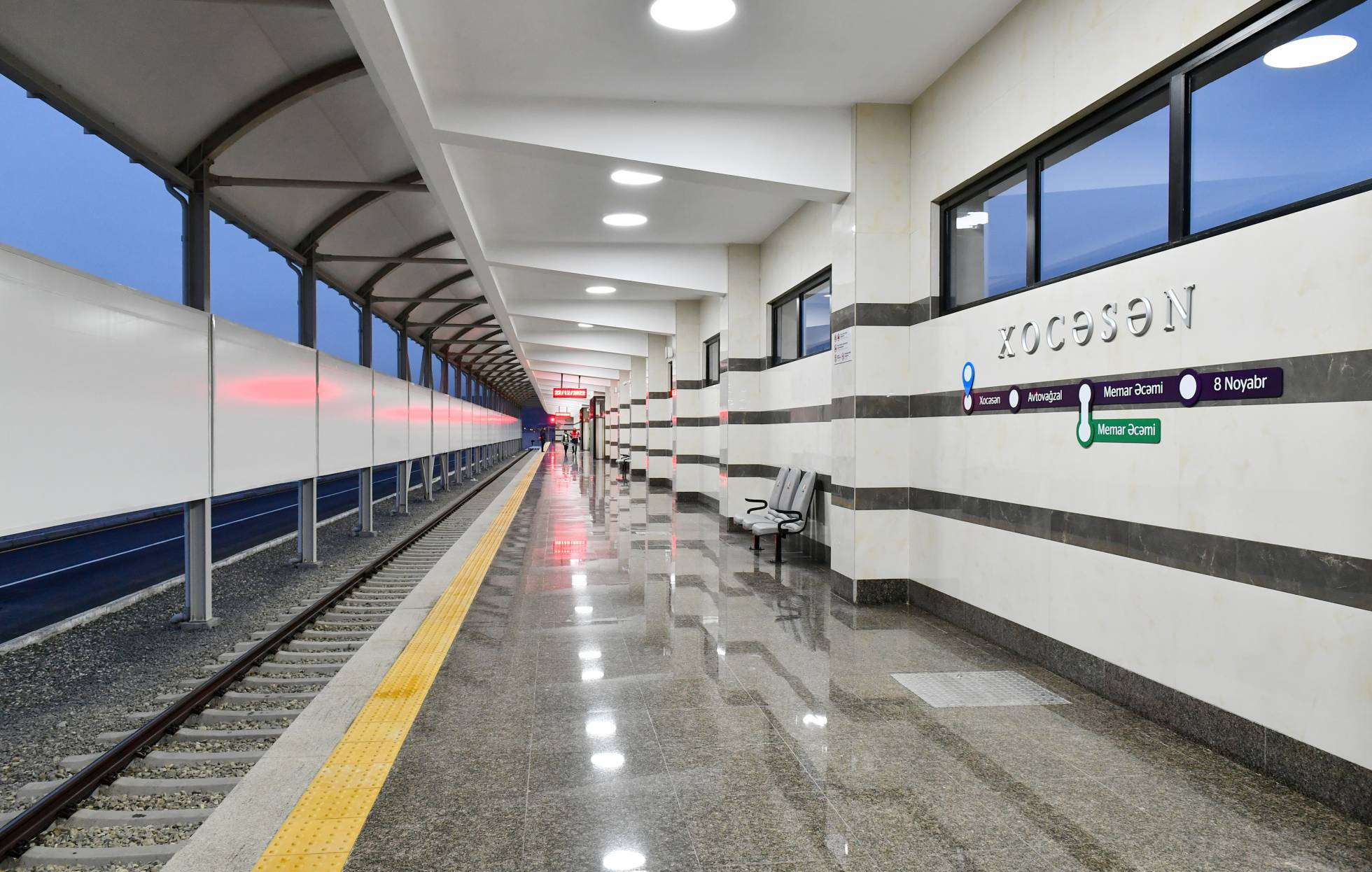
Khojasan Metro Station

The Khojasan metro station is the fourth station of the purple line Baku Metro.
