= Binagadi raion =

Binagadi Azerbaijani: Binəqədi raion
- Raion
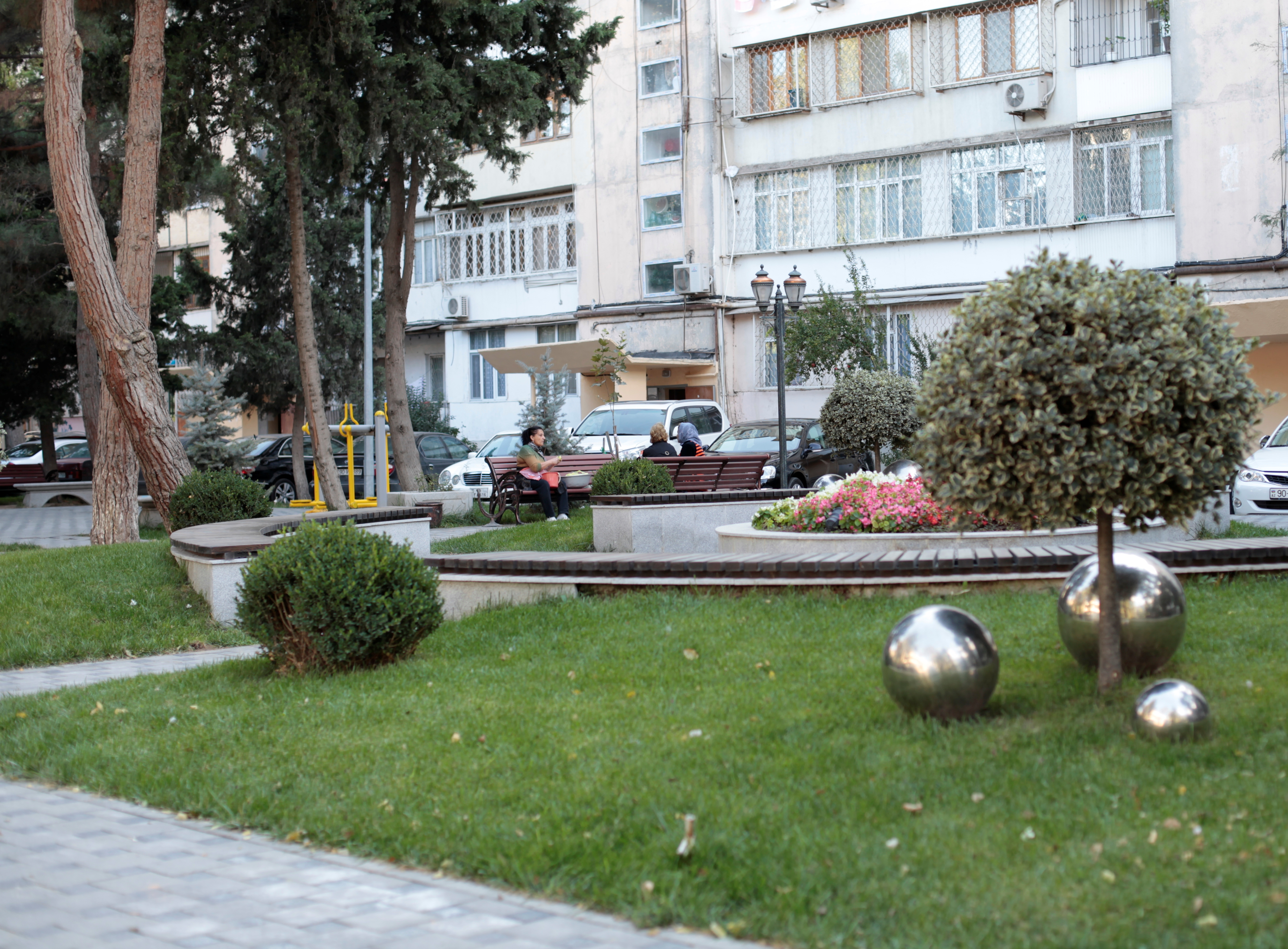

- Location within Azerbaijan
- Coordinates: 40°28′33″N 49°49′20″E
- Country: Azerbaijan
- City: Baku

Population (2010)
  - Total: 268,400
- Time zone: UTC+4 (AZT)
  - Summer (DST): UTC+4 (AZT)

Binagadi (Azerbaijani: Binəqədi rayonu or Şestoy; also Binagadi, Binoghad or Shestoy) is a raion in Baku, Azerbaijan. The rayon has a population of 240,800, of which 112,000 are in the municipality. Binagadi district (former Kirov region) is located in Baku administrative area and is located 10.5 km from the city center, in the North-West of the Absheron Peninsula. Territory is 147,06 sq. M, administrative center is M. Rasulzadeh settlement.

== Name ==
The former name of the district was the Kirov region and was named "Binagadi district" on April 29, 1992, by the decision of the National Council of the Supreme Council of the Republic of Azerbaijan.

== Demographics ==
The number of permanent residents living in the region is 264,600 and the actual population is about 400,000.

== Municipalities ==
The raion contains 5 municipalities: Bilajary (settlement and village), Binagadi, Hocasan, Rəsulzadə, 28 May (settlement district administrative districts), 4 microdistricts (6, 7, 8 and 9 micro district), 7 and 8 microdistricts, Darnagul residential area There are No 2 Administrative Area Territory (IDA) No. 2 covering the 6th and 9th micro-district borders.

There are 5 municipalities in the district, which have local self-governing bodies. Binagadi municipality covering the boundaries of the Area 1 and No. 2 and Darnagul settlement, Rasulzadeh municipality covering the boundaries of Rasulzade, Bilajari municipality covering Bilajary settlement, Binagadi settlement municipality, Binagadi settlement, Khojasan, Sulu- hill, and Khojashen municipality, which covers the boundaries of May 28.

== Transportation ==
The Binagadi Metro Station is planned in this area by Baku Metro in the future.

== See also ==
- Battle of Binagadi, 1918
