= Baku suburban railway =

Railway service in Baku, Azerbaijan

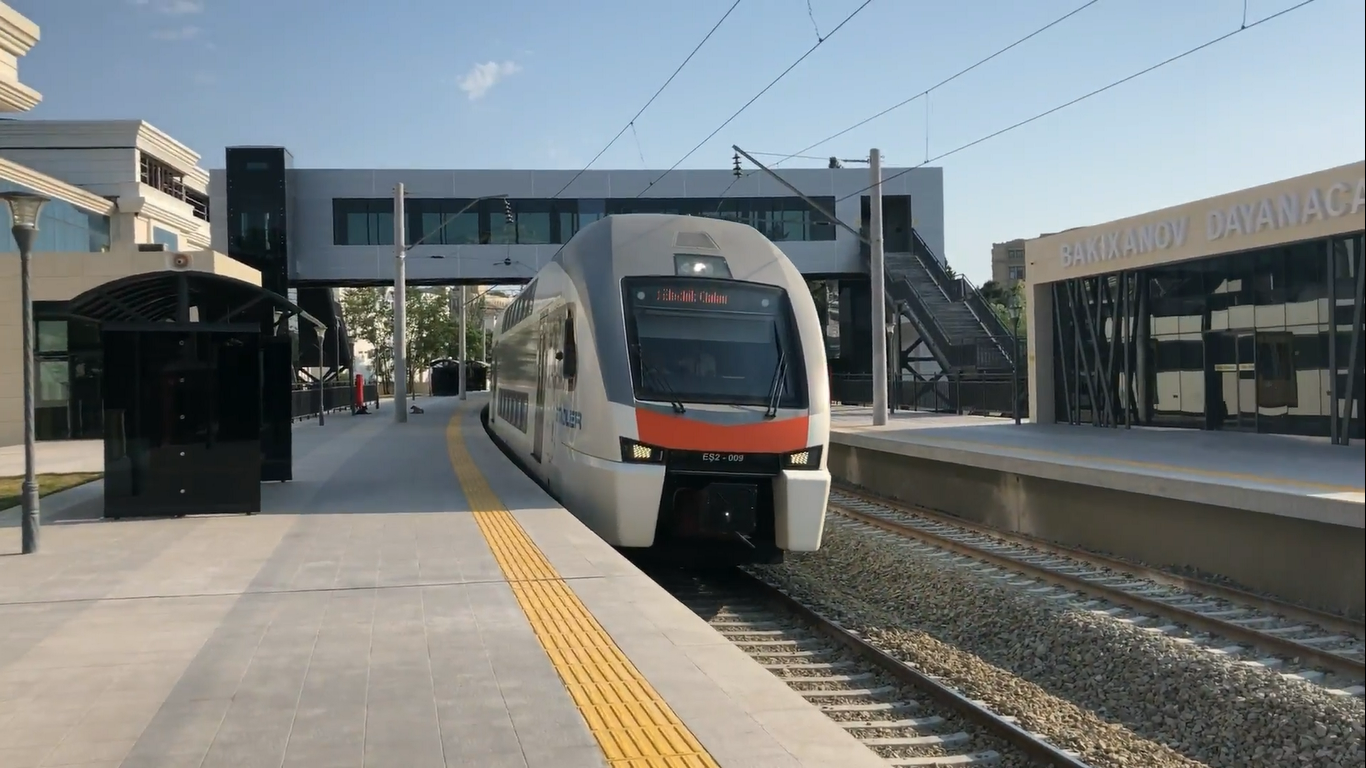
- EŞ2-009 electric train at Bakıxanov station

Overview
- Owner: Azerbaijan Railways
- Locale: Baku, Azerbaijan
- Transit type: Commuter rail
- Number of lines: 2 (2 more planned)
- Number of stations: 15 (54 Total Planned) (About total 340 km)
- Annual ridership: 8,500,000 (2024)
- Headquarters: Baku
- Website: Azerbaijan Railways Official Site

Operation
- Began operation: 21 May 2019
- Operator: ADY

Technical
- System length: 91 km (57 mi)
- Track gauge: 1,520 mm (4 ft 11 27/32 in) Russian gauge
System map
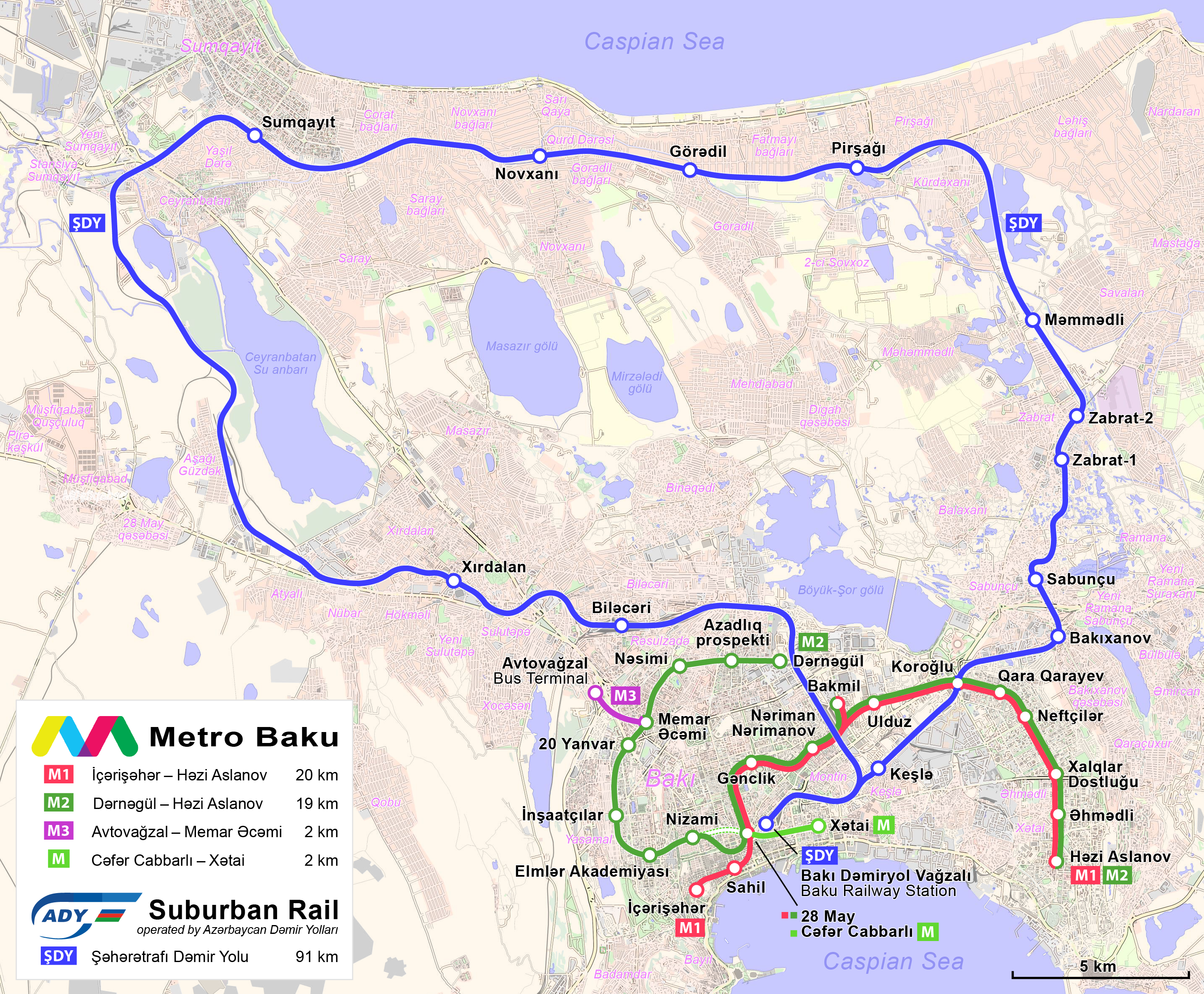
Baku suburban railway and metro map

The Baku suburban railway (Azerbaijani: Bakı şəhərətrafı dəmir yolu) or Absheron Circular line (Azerbaijani: Abşeron dairəvi xətti) is a 91 km (57 mi) commuter rail service which began in 2019, serving the Azerbaijani capital Baku.

== Background ==
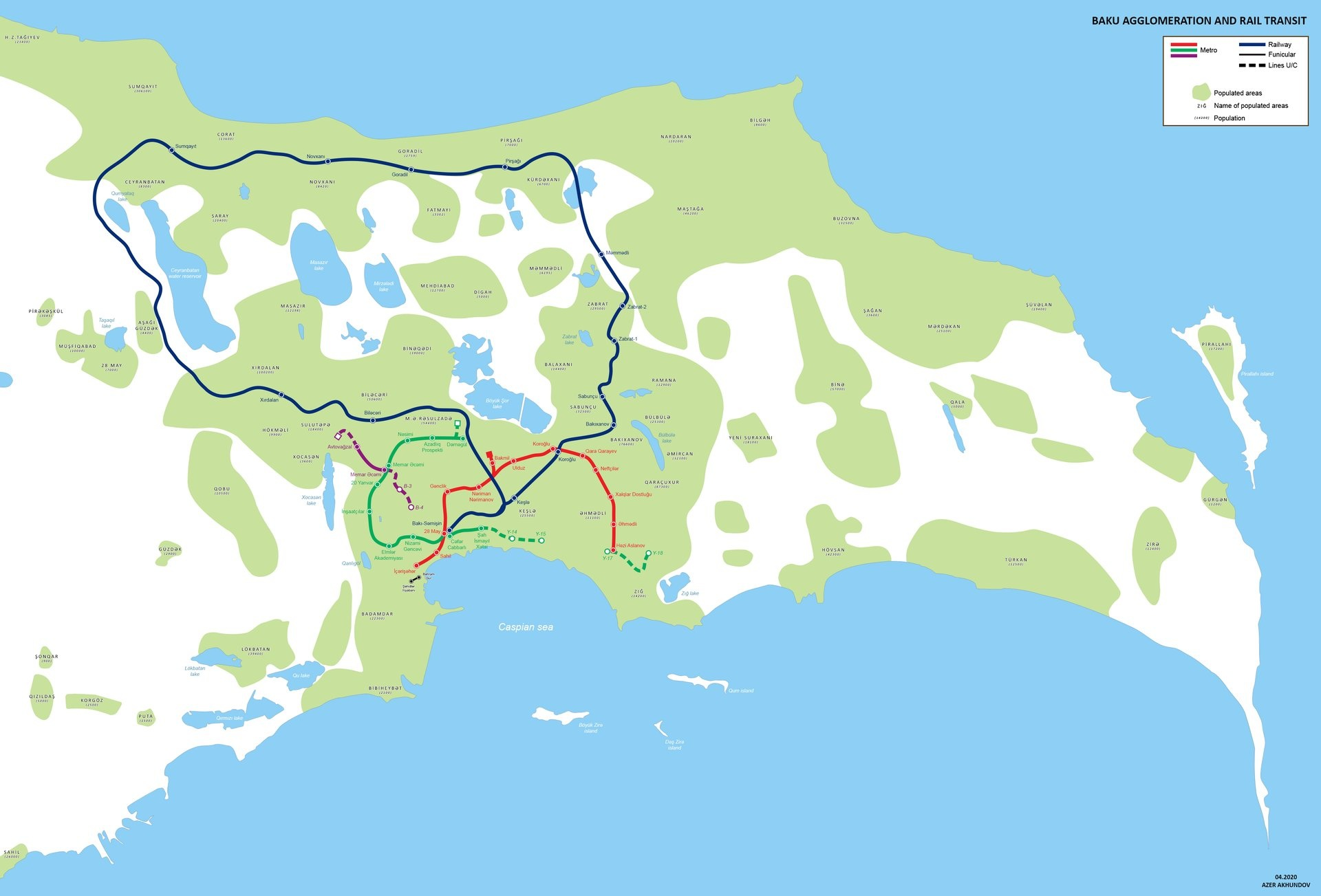
Baku suburban railway and metro map

In 2016, Chairman of Azerbaijan Railways Javid Gurbanov confirmed that work was underway on a 25 km (16 mi) railway line to Heydar Aliyev International Airport from Baku's main station.

In 2018, president Ilham Aliyev announced funding for a suburban rail service for Baku. The 100 million manat project was to include upgrading the existing railway between Baku and Sumqayıt via Biləcəri, as well as bring back into use the disused route connecting the two cities via Sabunçu and Pirşağı. The plans included 23 stations on the route, which would also have branches to Dübandi and Maştağa, with a branch serving the airport being built in a later phase.

The initial phase of the service was launched in May 2019, connecting Baku station with Sabunçu via four intermediate stations. By 2020, the line was extended to Sumqayit, linking to the existing Baku–Sumqayit railway to form a circle line.

== Stations ==
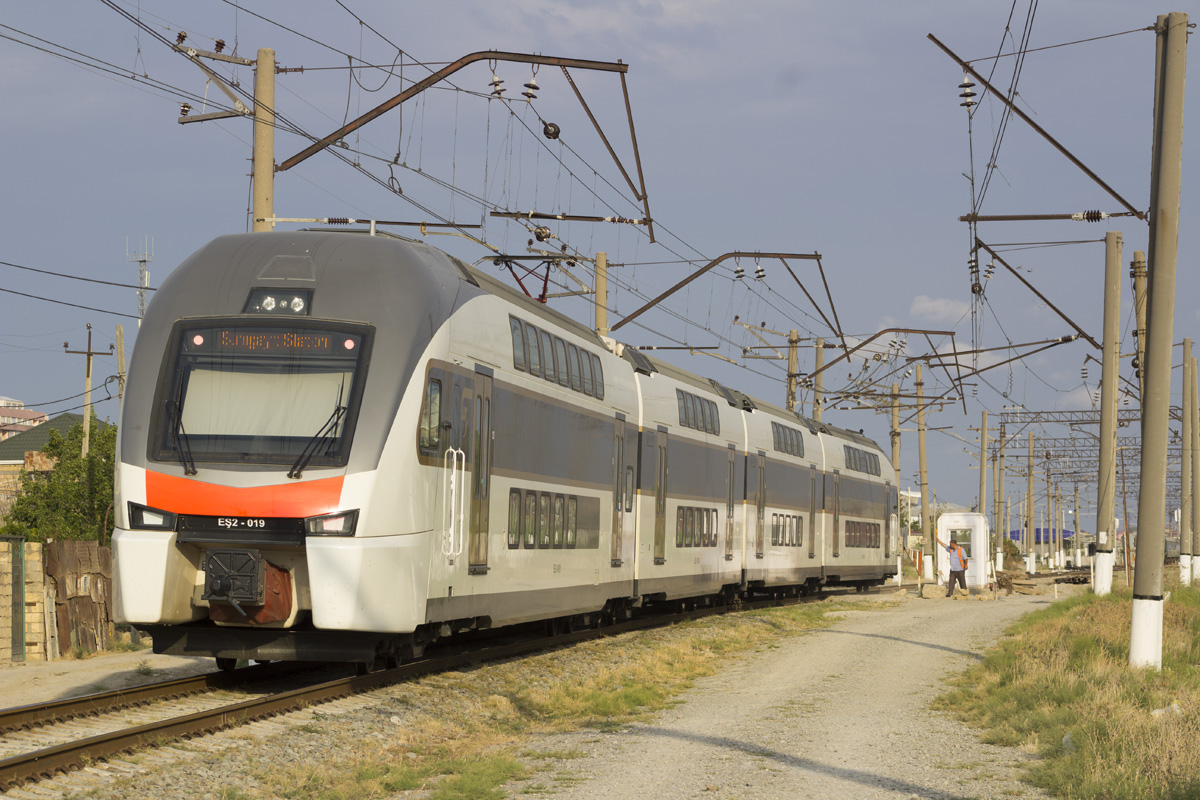
ESh2-019 Stadler electric train heading towards Sumqayıt station

At its 2019 opening, the suburban railway served seven stations. In 2020 seven stations were added, bringing the total to 14.

S1

- Baku Central
- Keshla
- Koroğlu
- Bakıxanov
- Sabunçu
- Zabrat 1
- Zabrat 2
- Məmmədli
- Pirşağı
- Goradil
- Novxanı
- Sumqayit
- Xırdalan
- Biləcəri
- Dərnəgül

== Interchange with Baku Metro ==
#	Transfer	At	Terminus
M1	Red	28 May (Baku Metro)	Westward
M2	Green	Jafar Jabbarly (Baku Metro)	Westward
M1	Red	Koroglu (Baku Metro)	Eastward
M2	Green	Darnagul (Baku Metro)	Eastward

Future

#	Transfer	At	Terminus
M3	Purple	Keshla-1	Westward
M4	Blue	Keshla-2	Westward
M3	Purple	Avtovagzal (Baku Metro)	Westward
M2	Green	Bakikhanov-1	Eastward
M4	Blue	Bakikhanov-2	Eastward
M2	Green	Koroglu-2	Eastward
M3	Purple	Khojasan (Baku Metro)	Westward
M4	Blue	Ramana	Eastward

== Transport exchange centers ==
- Baku railway station
- Koroğlu (Baku Metro)
- Darnagul (Baku Metro)
- Sumgait railway station

Future

- Baku International Bus Terminal
- Lokbatan

== History ==
The first Elektrichka ran on July 6, 1926, along the Baku–Sabunchi line in Soviet Azerbaijan.

== Rolling stock ==
=== Current ===
ESh2-019 (since 2019)

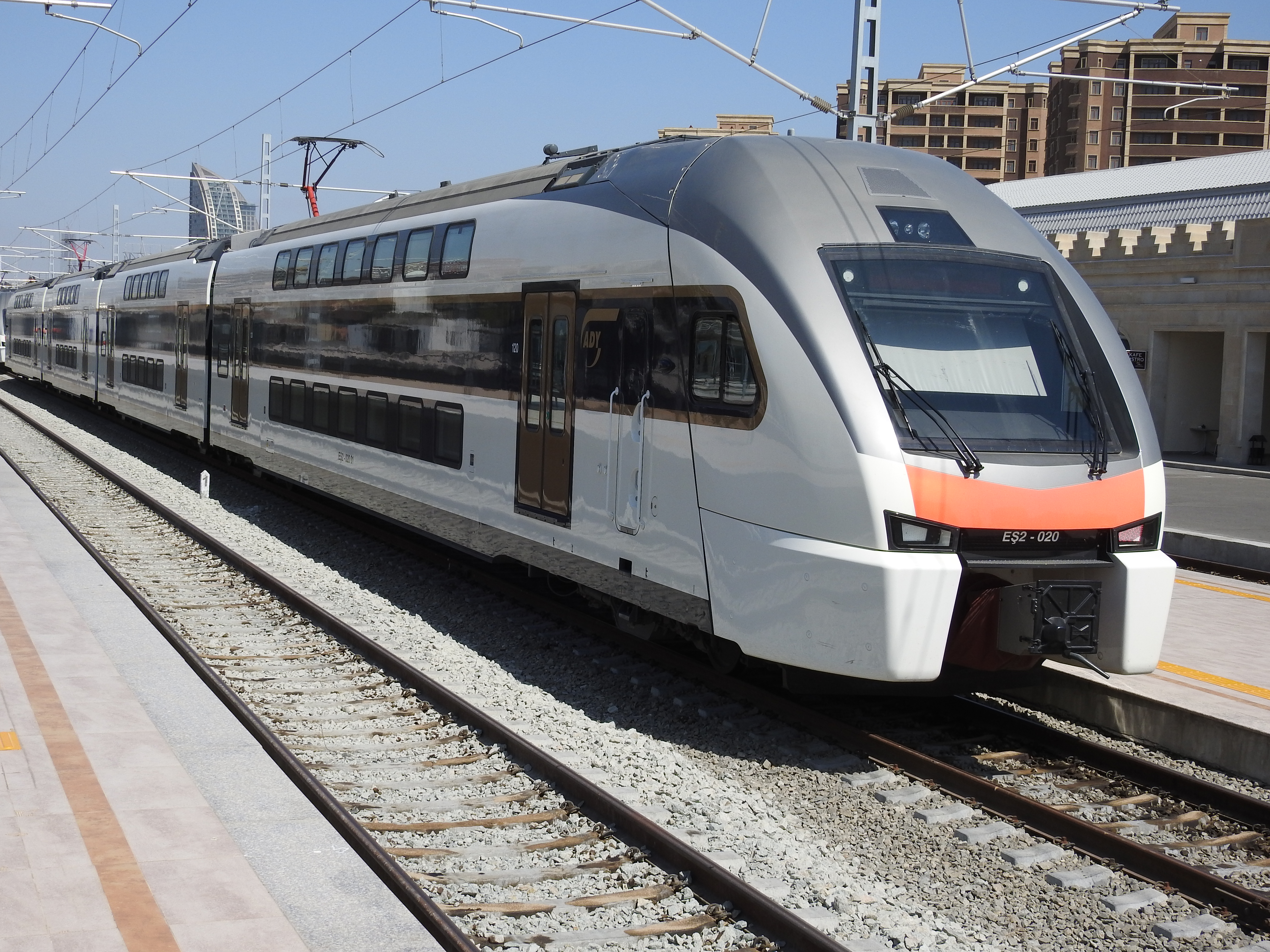
Stadler KISS electric multiple unit at Baku

=== Former ===
- Baku-Sabunchi electric multiple units (1926-c. 1940)
- S electric trainset (1940-????)
- ER2 (1970s-2004)
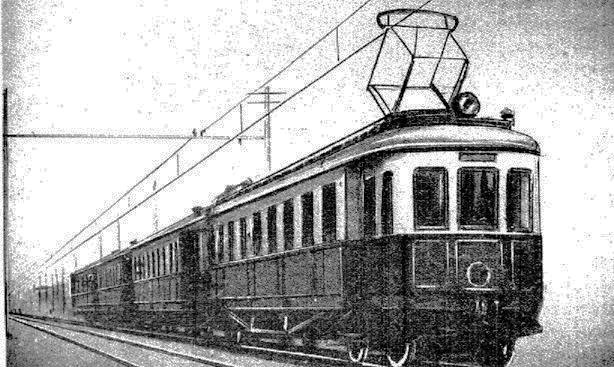
Baku-Sabunchi electric multiple units

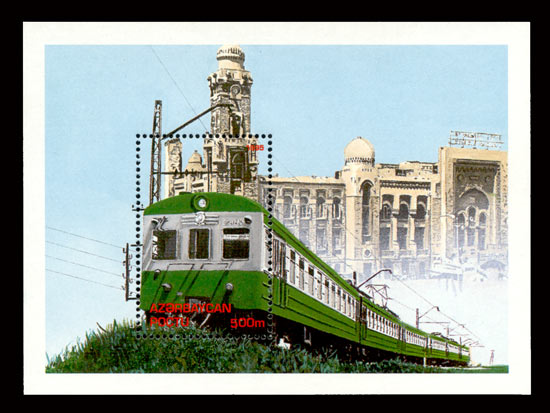
S elektrichka trainset, depicted in a 1996 postage stamp

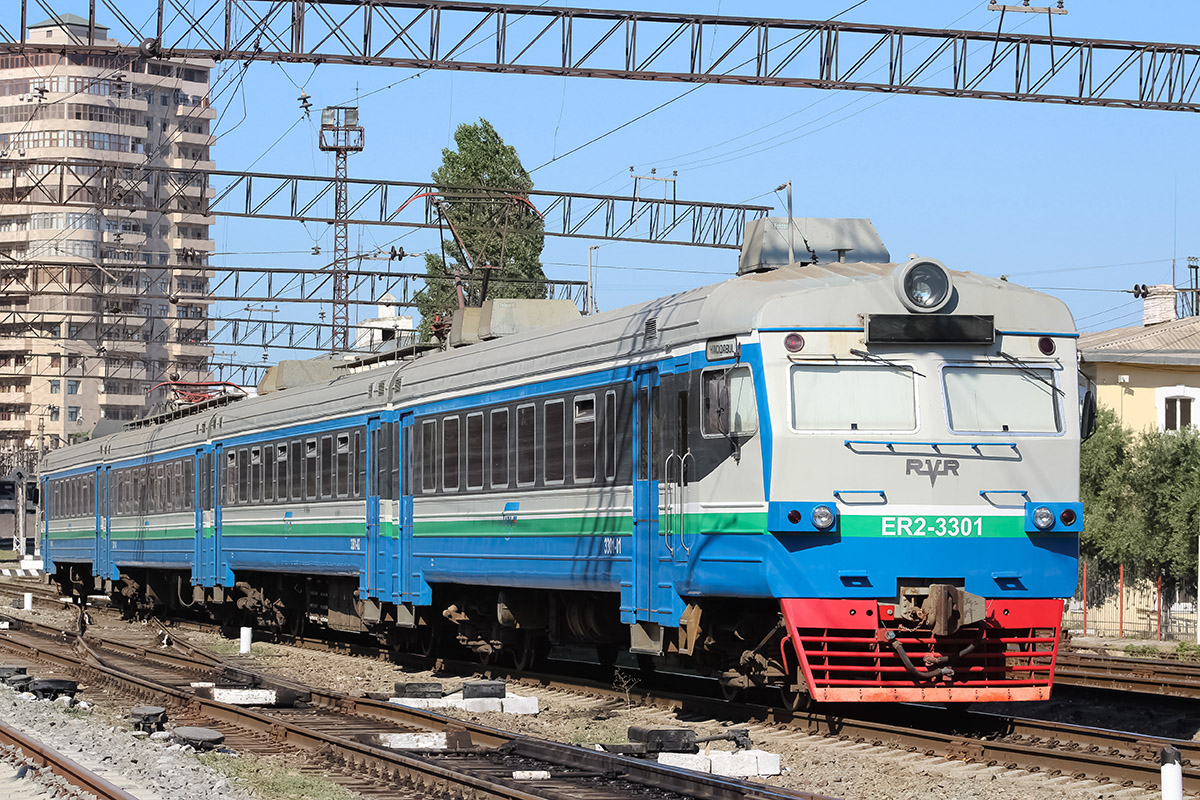
ER2 elektrichka

== Future plans ==
13 more stations are planned toward to the East, including Baku International Airport.

A total of 20 passenger railroad stations are planned to be reconstructed / commissioned / built on the Absheron Peninsula by the end of 2027, including the construction of 4 new stations between Balajari Station and Baku Railway Station, AzVision.az reports, referring to the 'Baku city General Plan 2040.

S2

- Bulbula
- Amirjan
- Azersun Arena
- Surakhani
- Yeni Suraxanı
- Baku International Airport
- Bina
- Qala

S3

- Mardakan
- Zagulba

S4

- Hovsan

== See also ==
- Trams in Baku
- Baku Metro
- Baku Transport Agency
- Transport in Azerbaijan
