= Avtovağzal (Baku Metro) =

Baku Metro Station

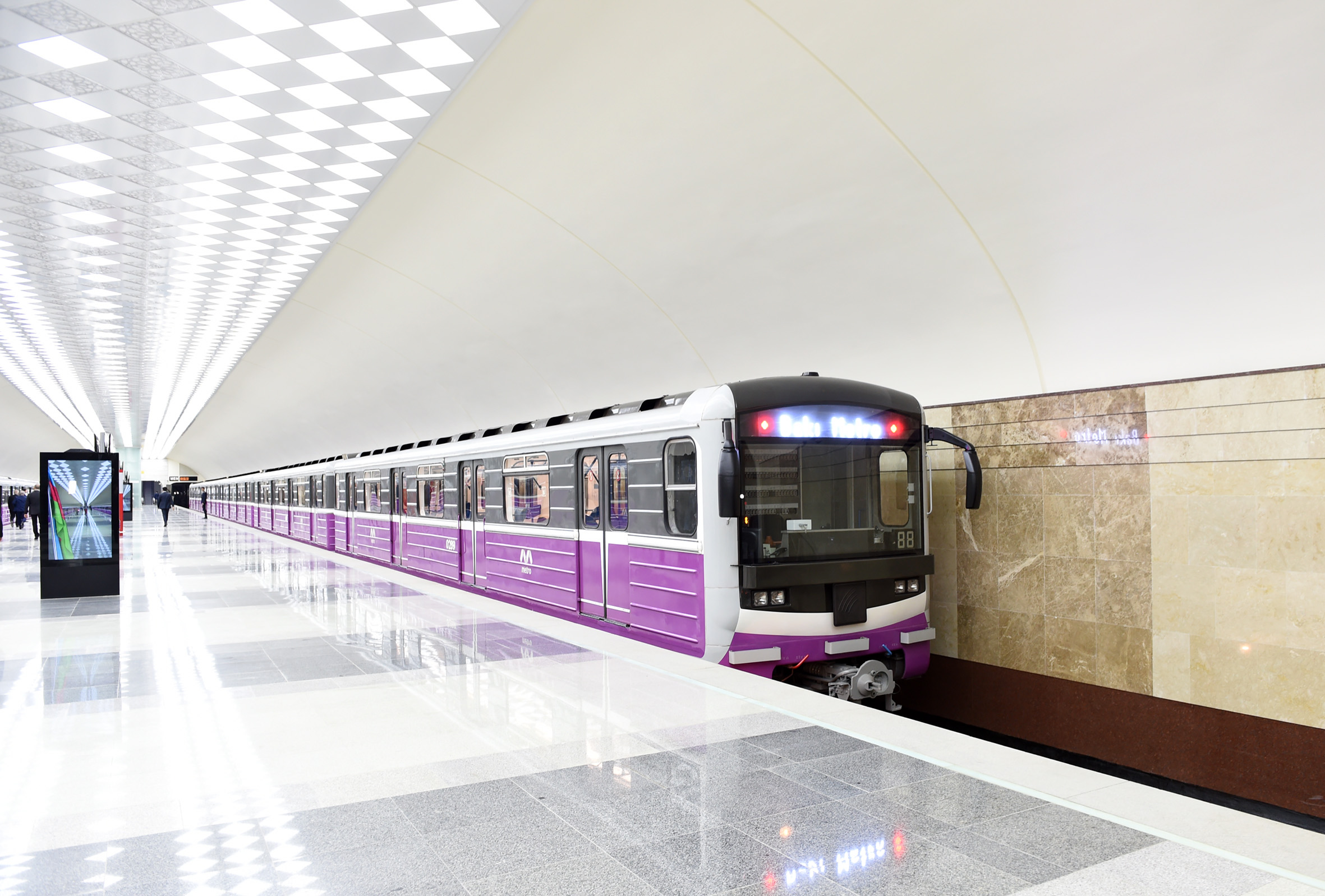

General information
- Location: Baku; Azerbaijan
- Coordinates: 40.42130013325184°N 49.794930980525756°E
- System: Baku Metro station
- Owner: Baku Metro
- Line: Purple line
- Connections: Baku International Bus Terminal; 83, 102, 119, 130, 135, 142, 157, 158, 199, 502, 503, 511, 515, 533, 551, 553, 567, 569, 592A, 595; Park and ride Future Baku suburban railway

Construction
- Accessible: Disabled access

History
- Opened: 19 April 2016

Services
Preceding station	Baku Metro	Following station
Khojasan Terminus	Purple line	Memar Ajami towards 8 Noyabr
Location

Avtovağzal is a Baku Metro station. It was opened on 19 April 2016, connecting the Baku International Bus Terminal to the Baku Metro network.

== Connections ==
Connection to Baku International Bus Terminal.

== Gallery ==
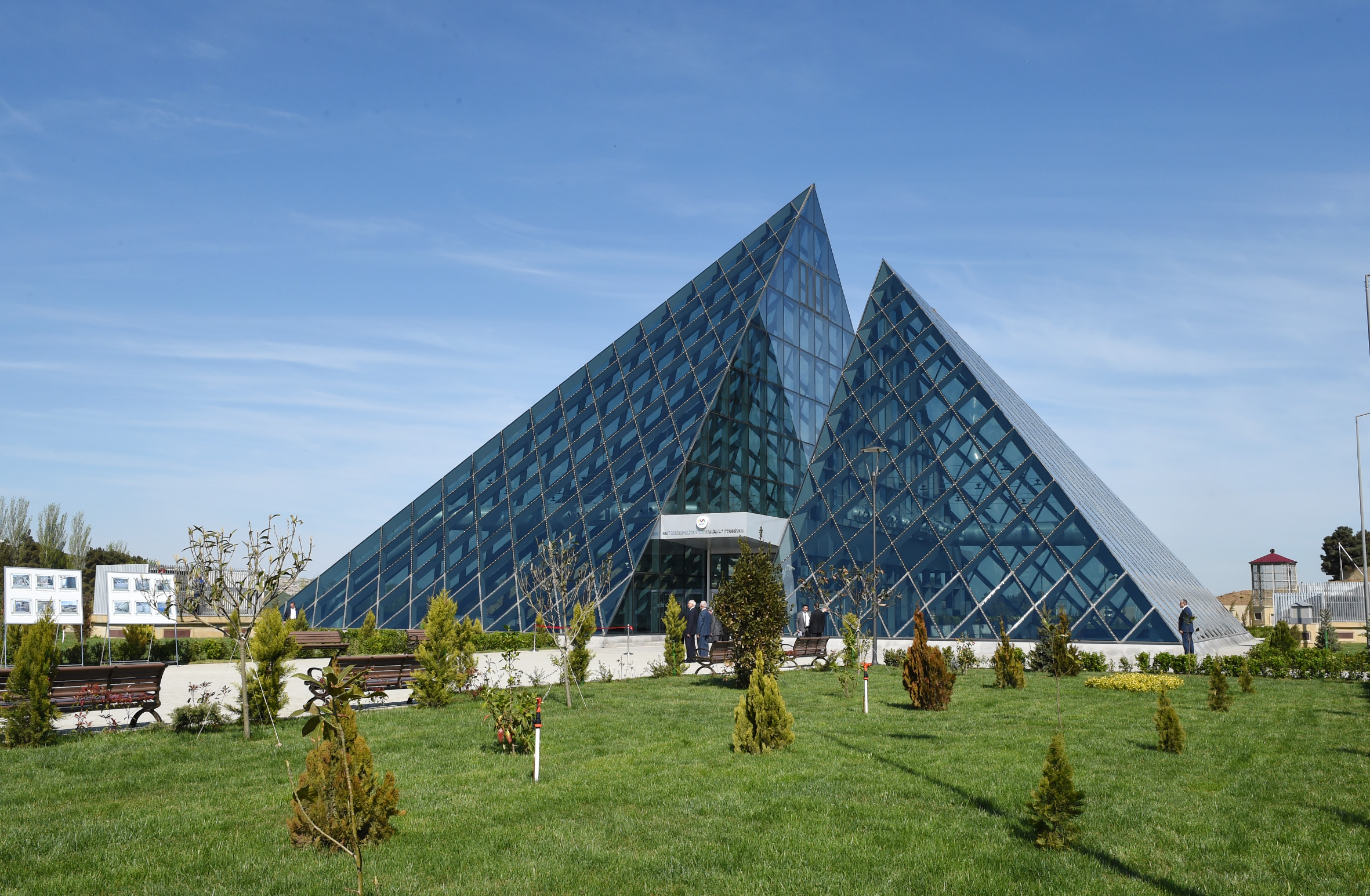
Exterior

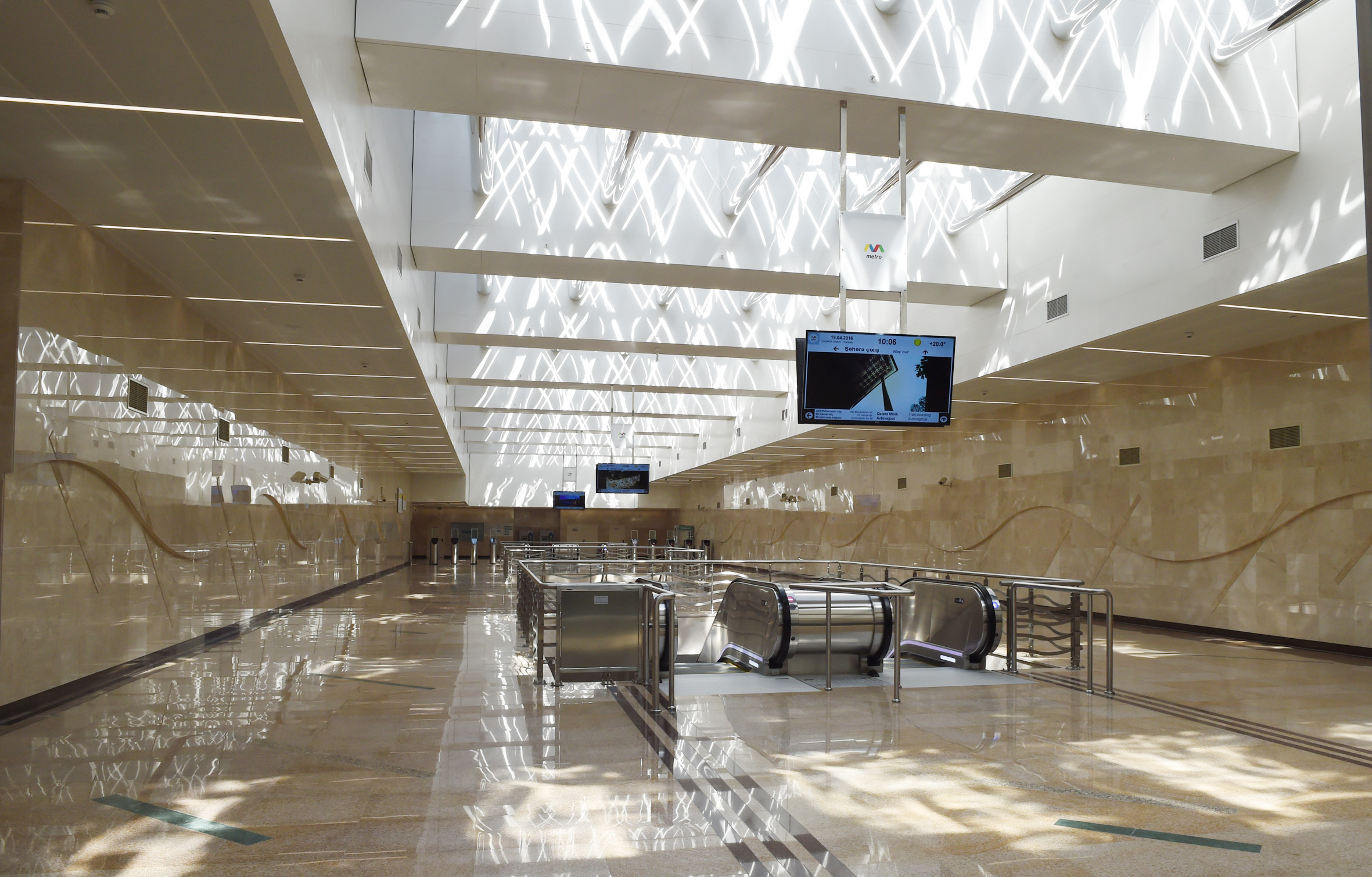
Interior

== See also ==
- List of Baku metro stations
- Baku International Bus Terminal
