= Koroğlu (Baku Metro) =

Baku Metro station

Coordinates: 40.3953°N 49.8822°E

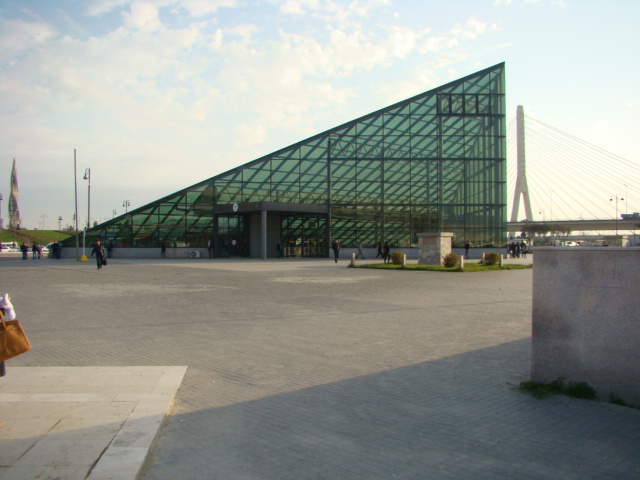

General information
- Location: Baku, Azerbaijan
- System: Baku Metro station
- Owner: Baku Metro
- Line: Red line
- Tracks: 2
- Connections: Bus station Airport bus Park and ride Koroglu railway station (Future) Green line Tram Line

History
- Opened: 6 November 1972

Services
Preceding station	Baku Metro	Following station
Ulduz towards Icheri Sheher	Red line	Gara Garayev towards Hazi Aslanov
Ulduz towards Darnagul	Green line	Gara Garayev towards Hazi Aslanov
Location

Koroğlu is a Baku Metro station. It was opened on 6 November 1972. It was called Məşədi Əzizbəyov until 30 December 2011. It is located just south of the Baku Olympic Stadium. This station is located in the city Transport HUB.

== Connections ==
Connects to Baku suburban railway and Baku Transport Interchange Center. + Multimodal Transport HUB.

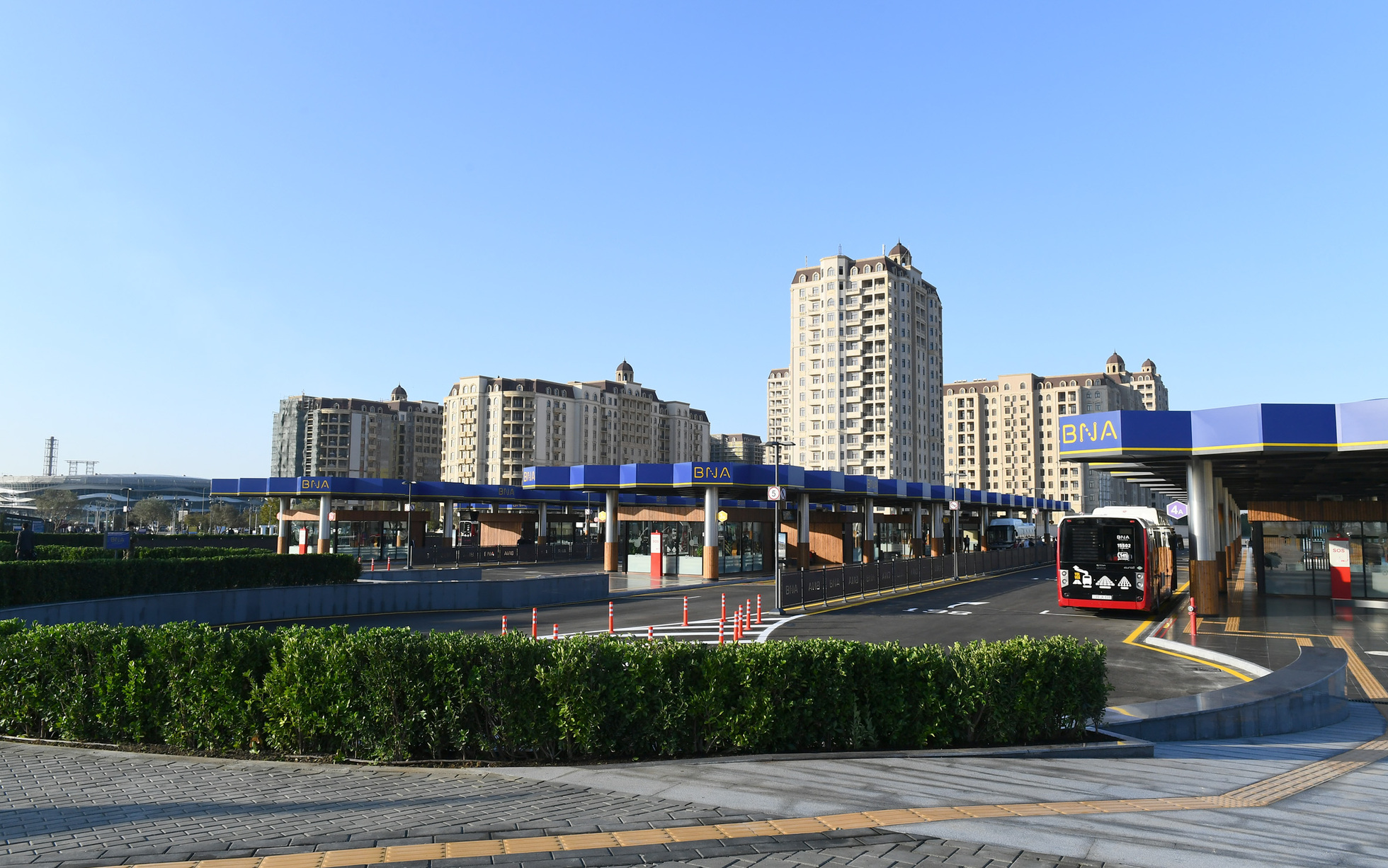
Baku Transport Interchange Center at Koroglu.

=== Aero Express Bus ===
BakuBus H1 buses run 24 hours a day from Koroglu Metro Station to Baku Airport.

== See also ==
- List of Baku metro stations
- Epic of Koroghlu
