= Baku railway station =

Railway station in Baku, Azerbaijan

Baku

- Baku railway station in 2026

General information
- Location: Baku, Azerbaijan
- Coordinates: 40°22′59″N 49°51′12″E
- System: Azerbaijan Railways Central Terminal

- Owner: Azerbaijan Railways

- Operator: Azerbaijan Railways
- Lines: Baku suburban railway, Inter-city rail, International railway
- Platforms: 5
- Tracks: 8
- Connections: 28 May; Jafar Jabbarli Red line Green line Bus station Airport bus Bike lane (Future) Tram

Construction
- Structure type: At-grade
- Parking: Yes

Other information
- Station code: 547112

History
- Opened: 1880
- Rebuilt: 1926

Services
Preceding station	Azerbaijan Railways	Following station
Xırdalan Next clockwise	Baku suburban railway	Keshla Next counter-clockwise
Bilajari towards Qazax	Baku-Qazax	Terminus
Bilajari towards Qabala	Baku-Qabala	Terminus
Bilajari towards Balakən	Baku-Balakən	Terminus
Preceding station	Georgian Railway	Following station
Tbilisi towards Kars, Turkey	Baku–Tbilisi–Kars	Terminus
Location
- Location within Azerbaijan

Baku railway station (Azerbaijani: Bakı Dəmir Yolu Vağzalı) is the central station of Baku, the capital of Azerbaijan. It is located in the Nesimi district in central Baku, approximately 3 km northeast from the historical core of Baku, İçərişəhər. This station is located in the city Transport HUB.

It is connected to the adjacent 28 May metro station by a pedestrian tunnel. It is also the terminal of the circular Baku suburban railway, Inter-city rail and International railway lines.

== History ==
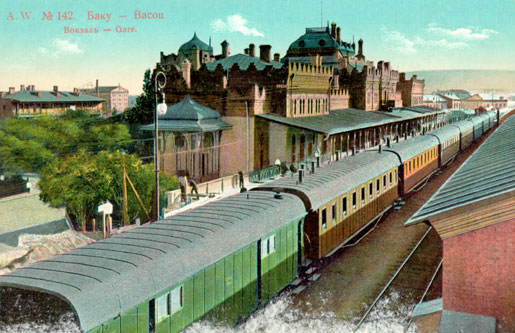
Baku Rail Station in late 19 Century

The first station building dates back to 1880, with the launch of the Baku-Tbilisi railway. The architecture of the first building was in the Moorish Revival style. In 1926, the second station complex, Sabunchu Station, was designed and constructed to serve the electrified Baku–Sabunchu railway. The architecture of the second building is also in the Moorish Revival style. In 1967, the 28 May metro station was built and connected to the Sabunchu Station by a pedestrian tunnel. In 1977, the station underwent a major renovation, during which a modern station building was built, adjacent to the old Sabunchu Station. In 2017, the station underwent a renovation again.

Azerbaijan Railways CJSC launched brand new Darnagul railway station on May 8, 2026.

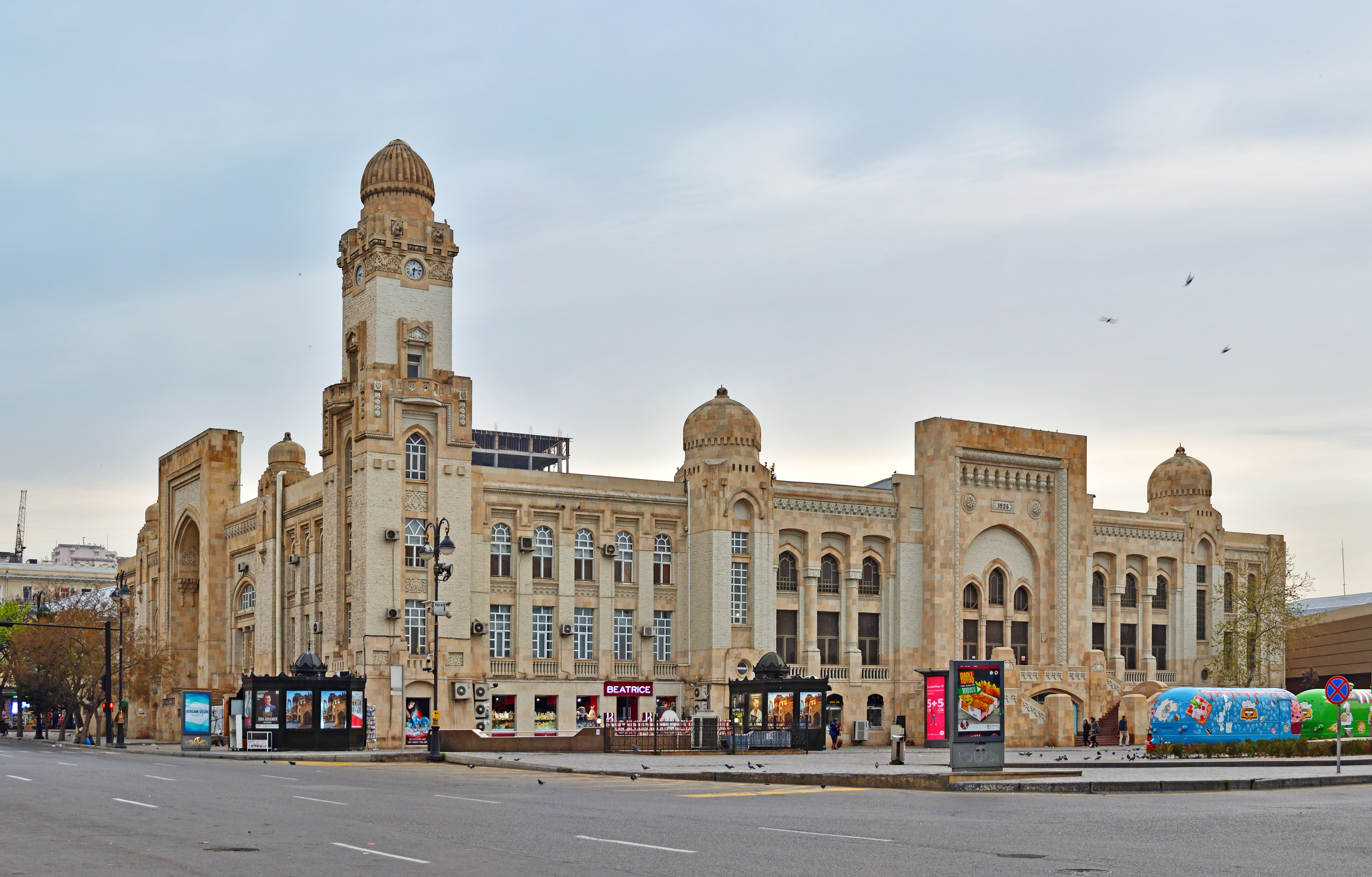
Baku Electrical Railway Station, built in 1846

== Local public transport ==
The station is served by the following public transport services:

Connections by Baku Metro of 28 May (Baku Metro) station in Red line and Jafar Jabbarly (Baku Metro) station in Green line.

=== Aero Express Bus ===
BakuBus H1 buses run 24 hours a day from Station to Baku Airport.

== Gallery ==
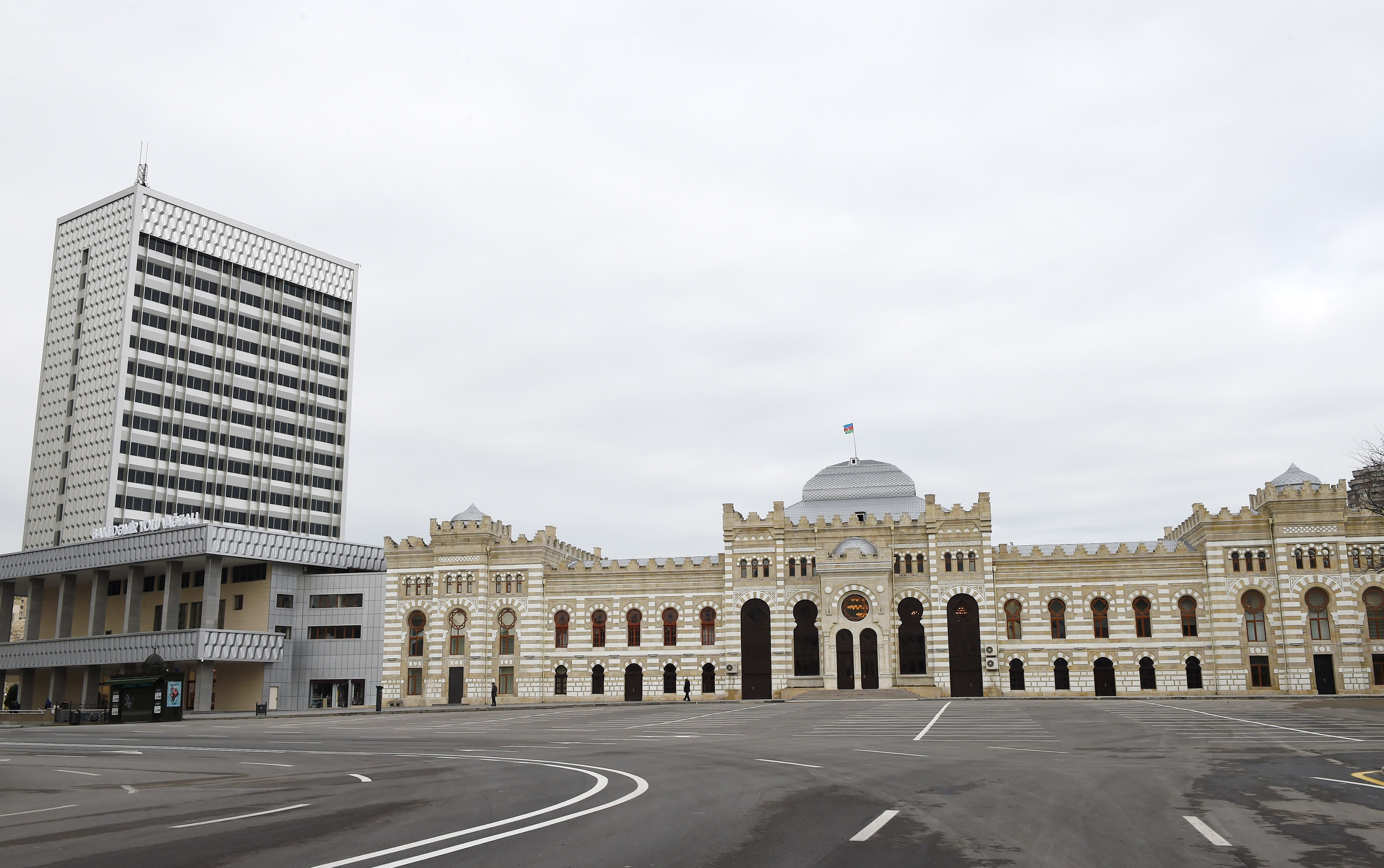
Baku railway station, February 2017

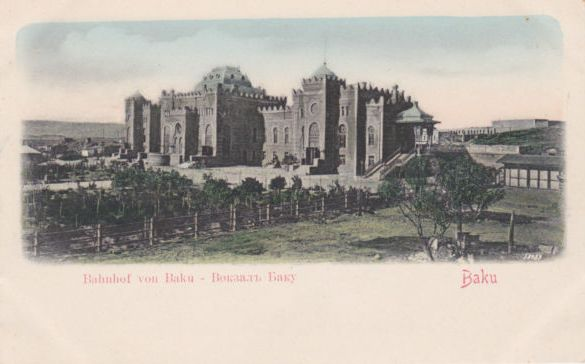
Postcard, circa 1910

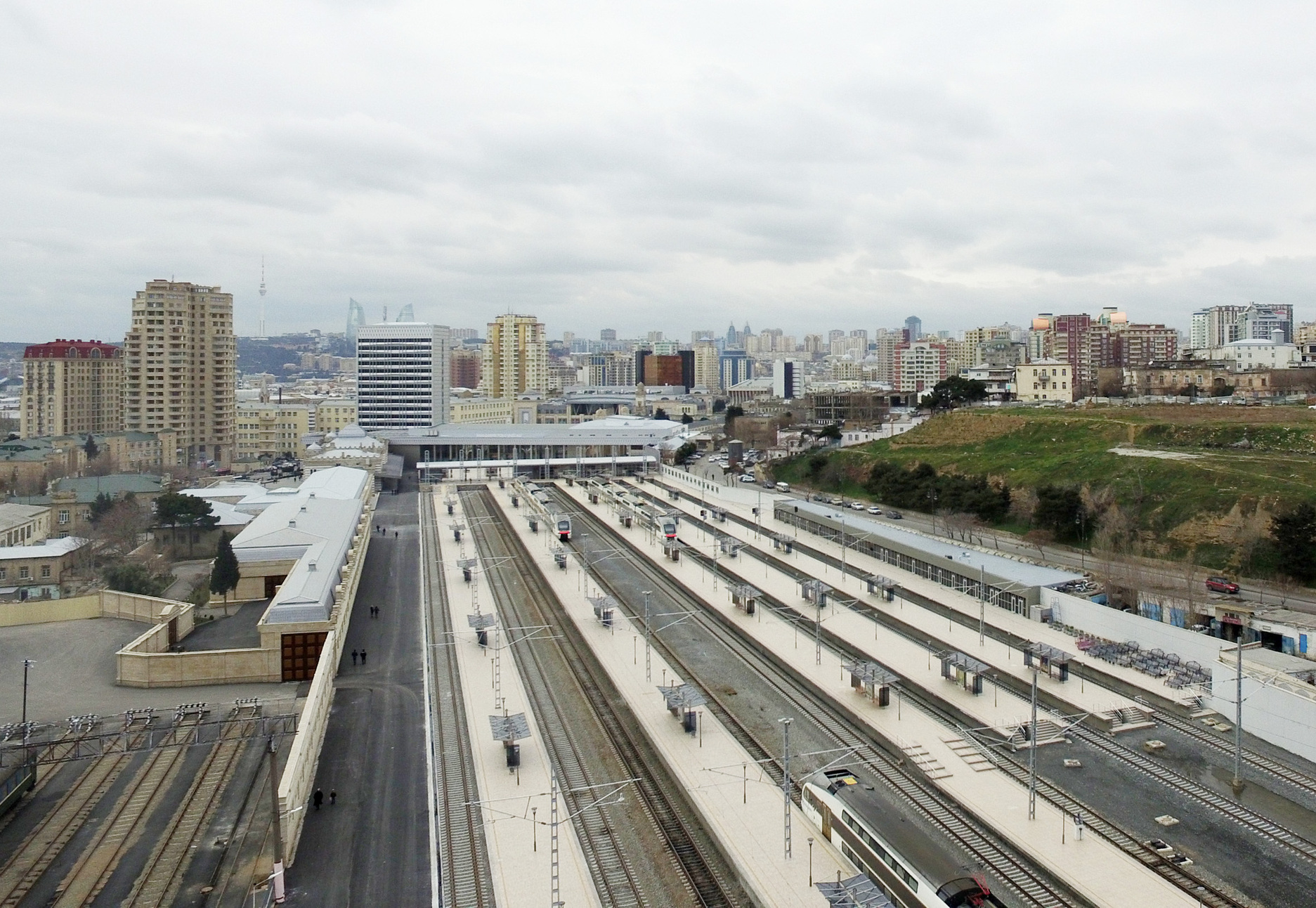
Platforms, February 2017

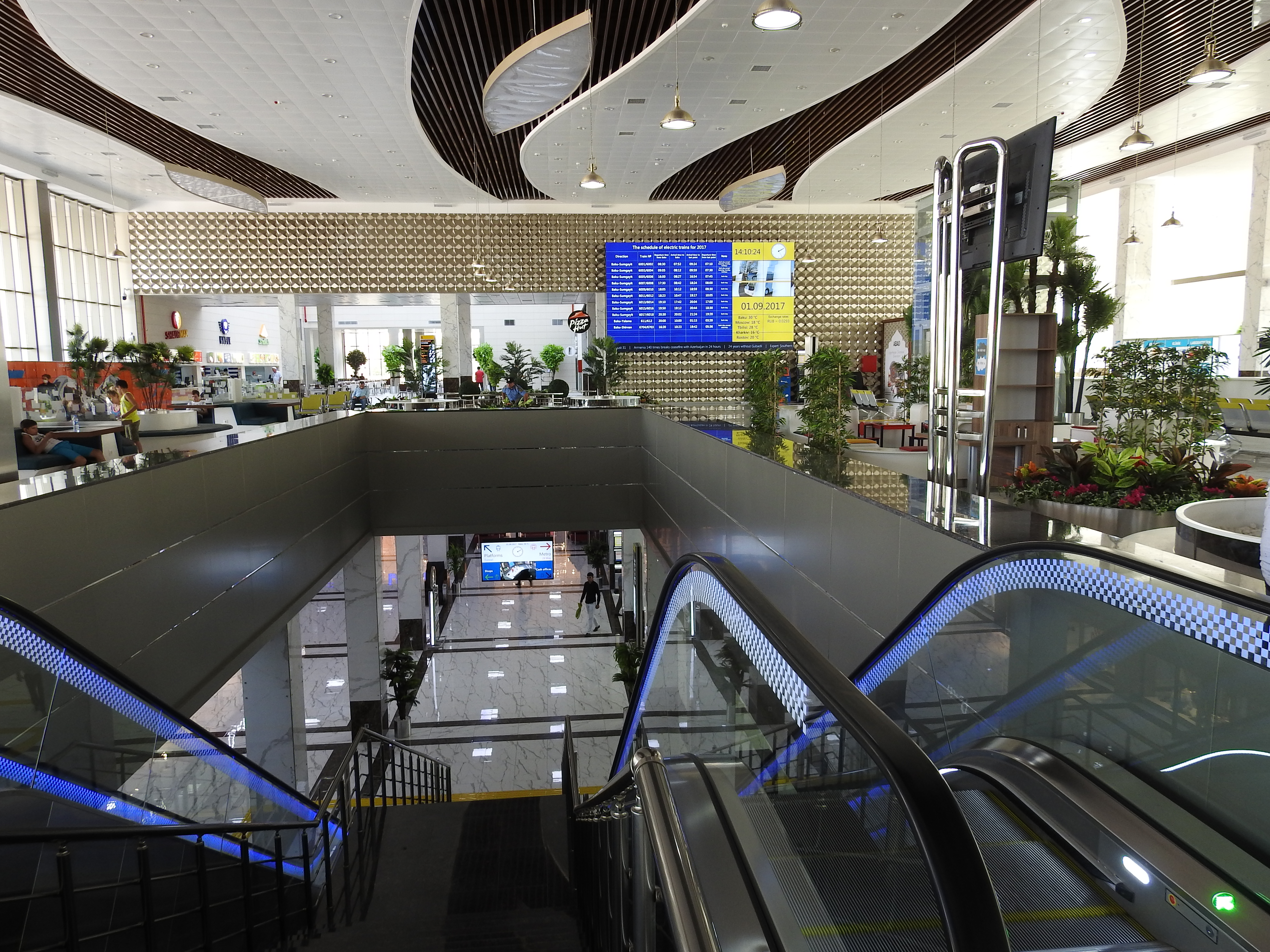
Escalators to the 28 May metro station, 2017

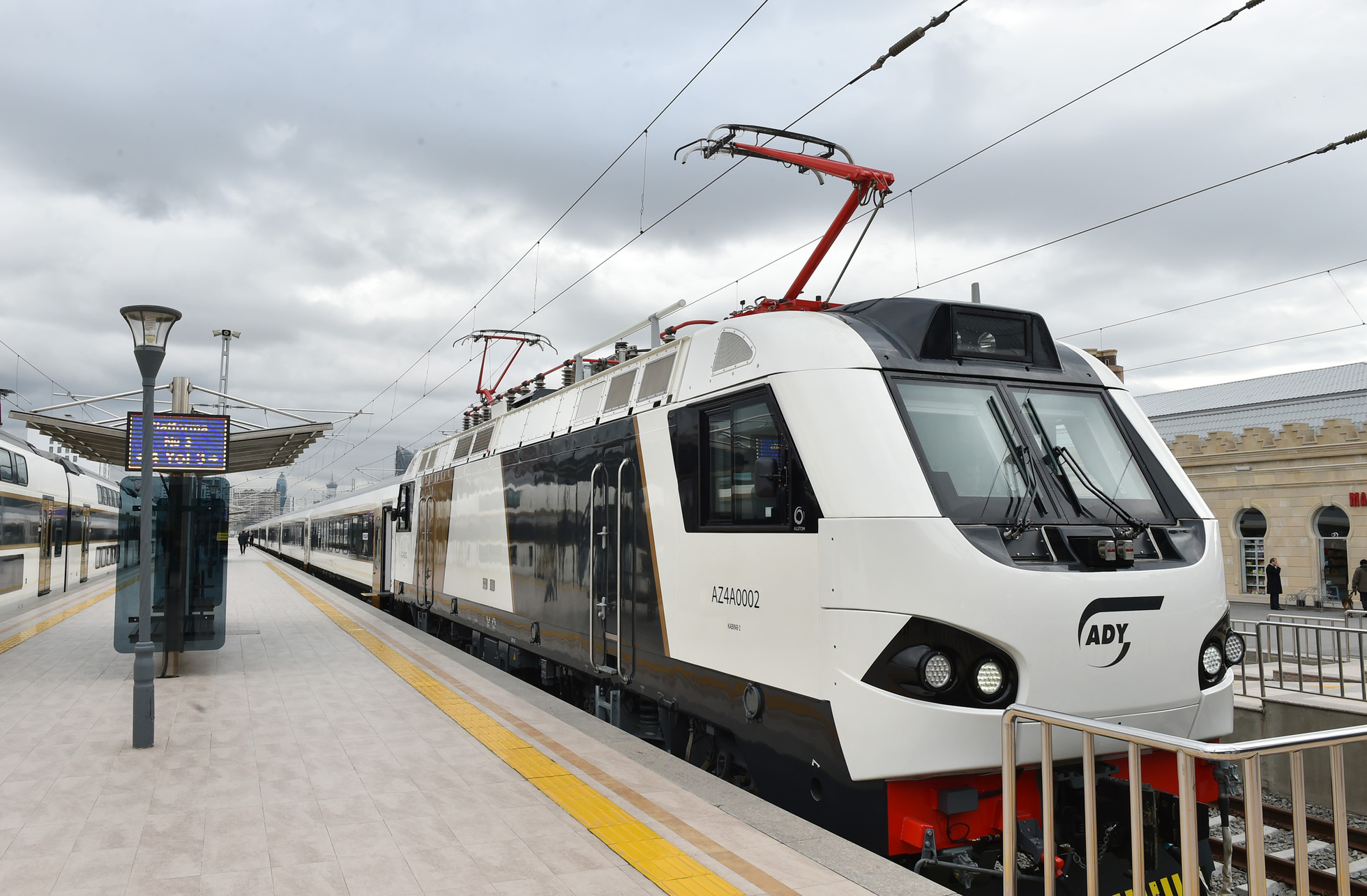
Electric locomotive AZ4A-0002 with passenger coaches at the station, 2019

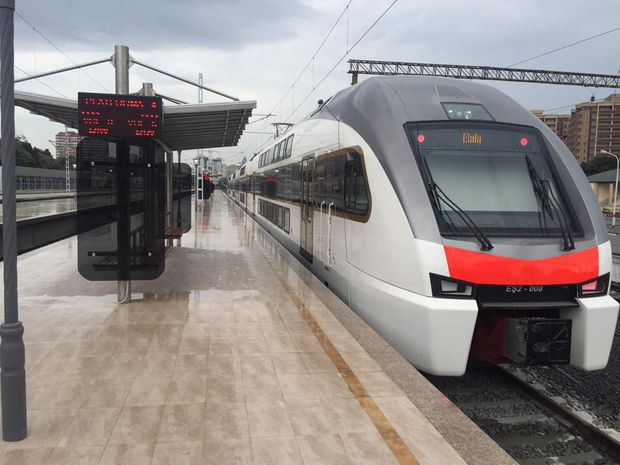
Baku-Sumgait Train

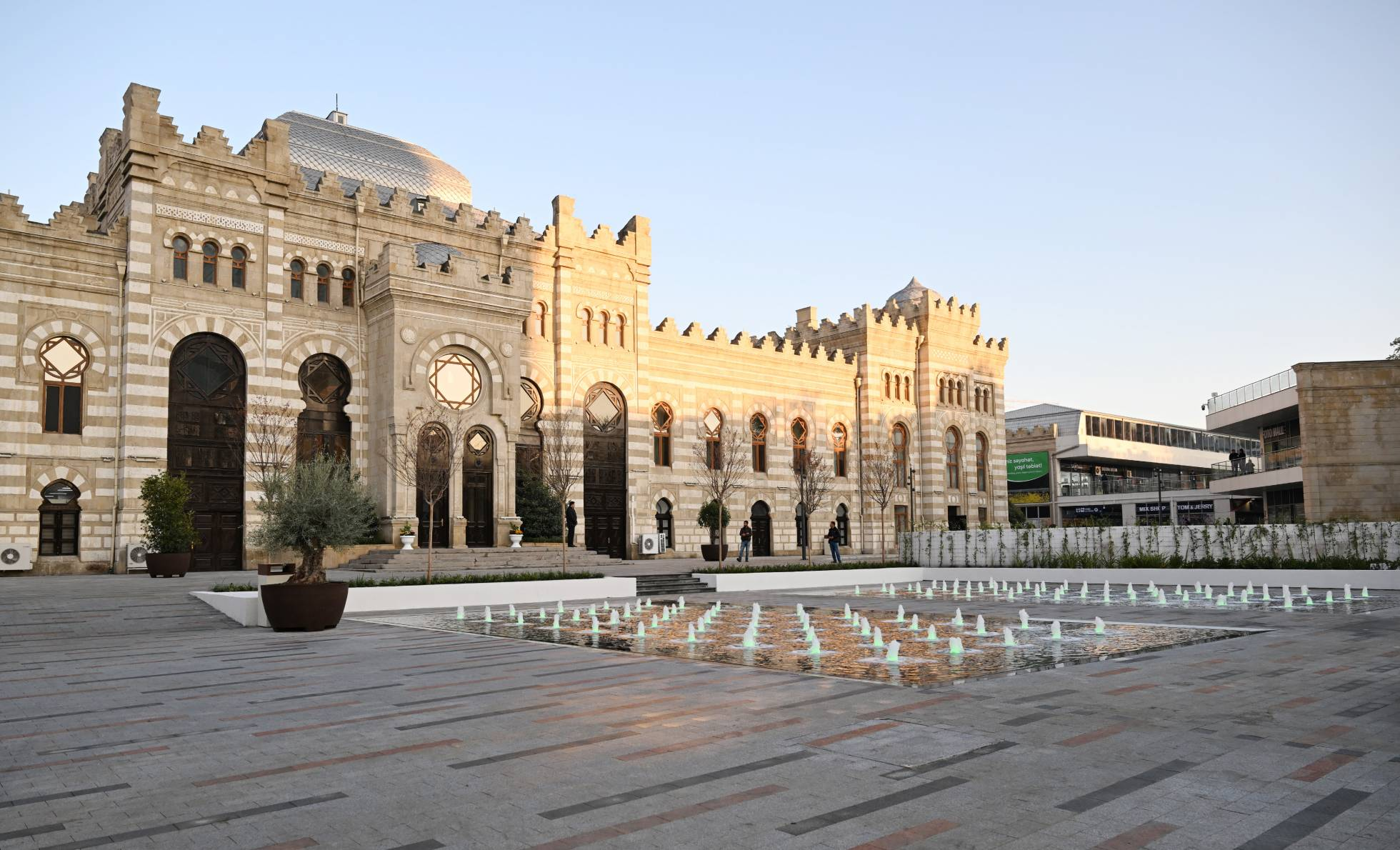
Baku Rail Station in 2024

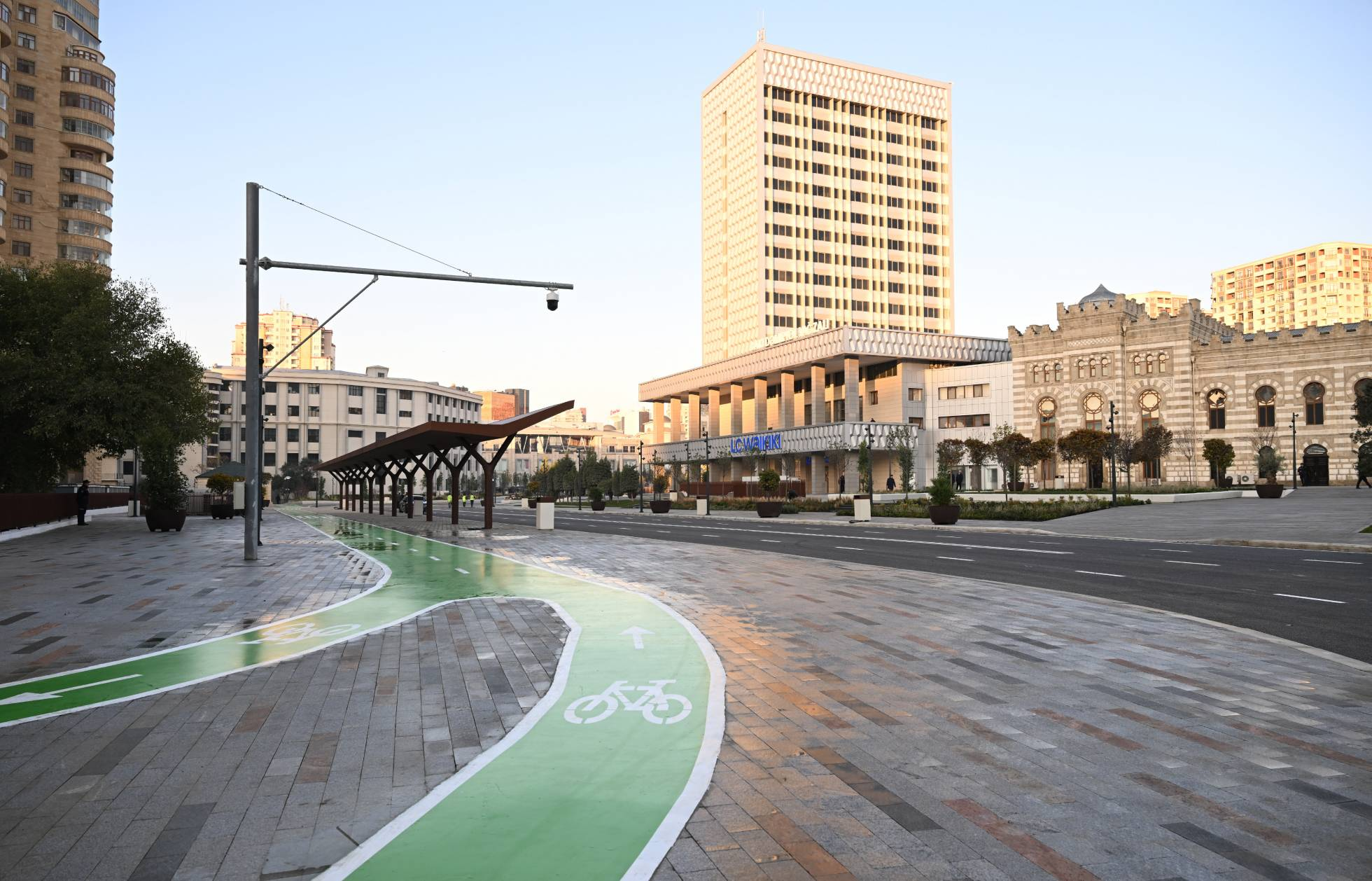
Bike Lanes linking to Central Station

== See also ==
- Azerbaijan Railways
- Rail transport in Azerbaijan
- Sumgait railway station
- Aghdam Railway and Bus Station Complex
- Baku–Tbilisi–Kars railway
