= Goradil =

- Municipality
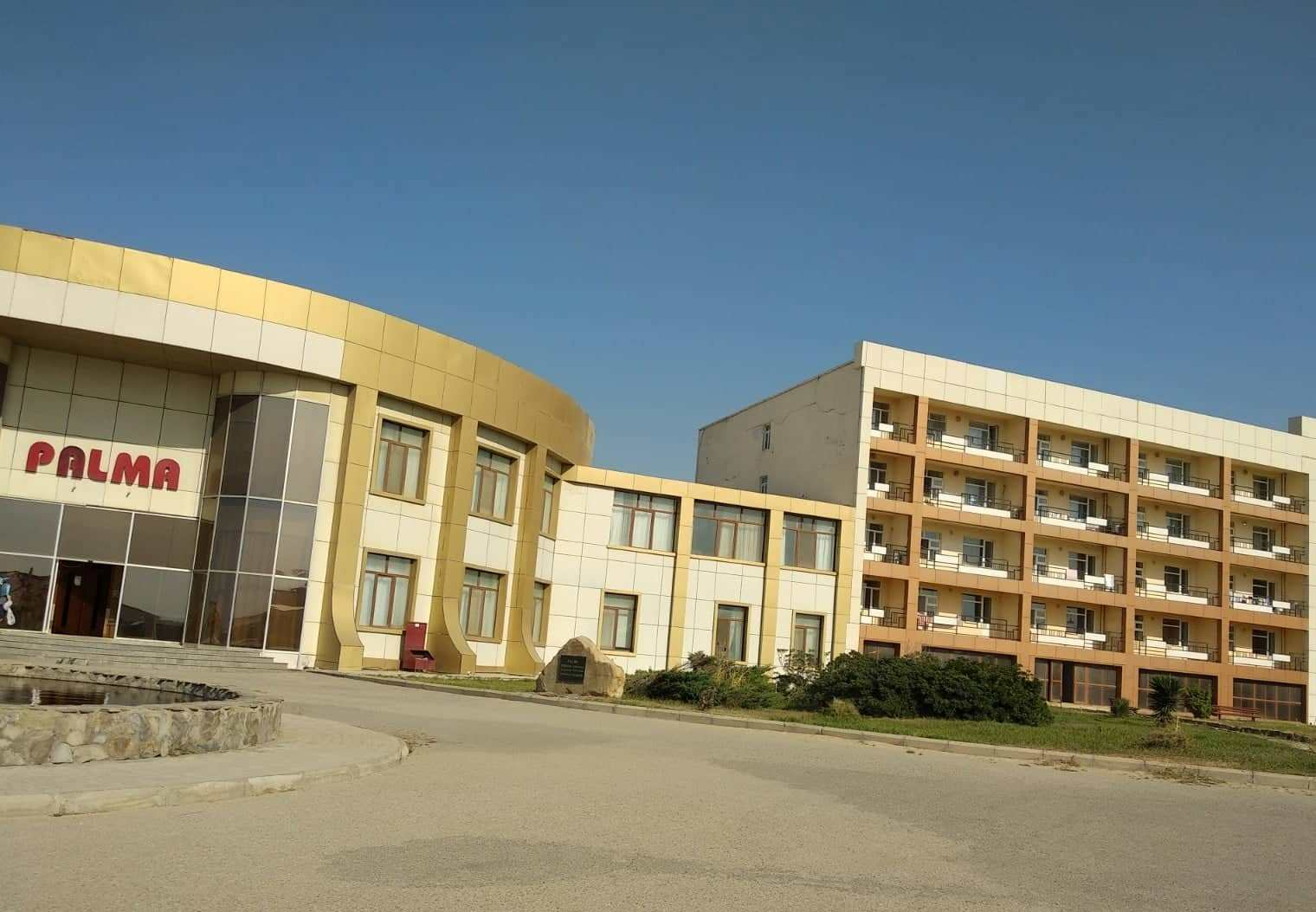

- Location within Azerbaijan
- Coordinates: 40°32′55″N 49°49′47″E
- Country: Azerbaijan
- Rayon: Absheron

Population
  - Total: 2,000
- Time zone: UTC+4 (AZT)
  - Summer (DST): UTC+5 (AZT)

Goradil (Tat: Herodil) is a village and the least populous municipality in the Absheron Rayon of Azerbaijan. It has a population of 2000. The area is a part of the Azerbaijan shrub desert and steppe.

== Transportation ==
Baku suburban railway
