= Aghdam Railway and Bus Station Complex =

Railway station and bus terminal complex in Aghdam, Azerbaijan

Aghdam Railway and Bus Station Complex Ağdam Dəmir Yolu və Avtovağzal Kompleksi

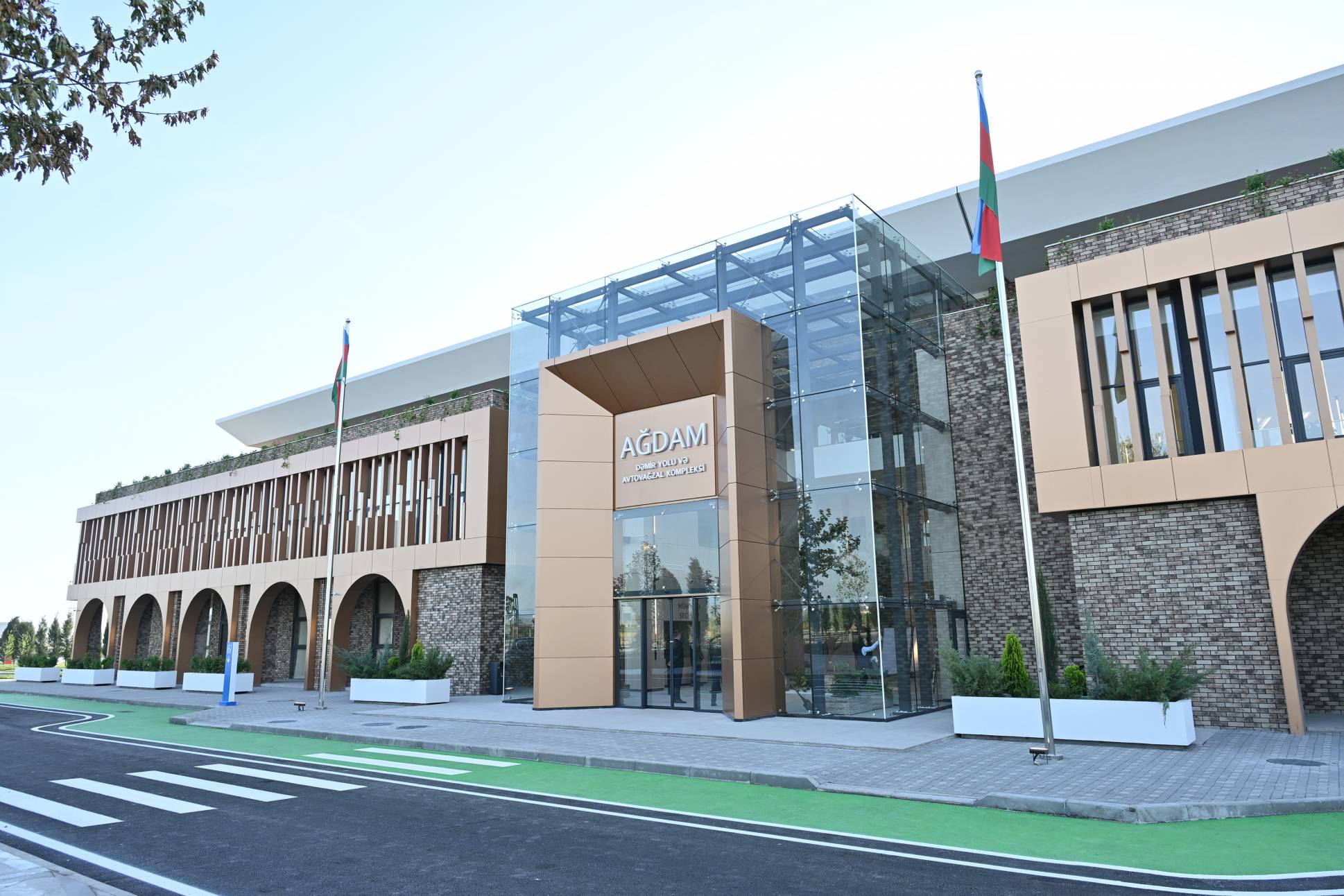

General information
- Location: Azerbaijan
- Coordinates: 39°59′46″N 46°58′05″E
- Owner: Azerbaijan Railways
- Line: Barda–Aghdam railway line
- Connections: Bus transport

History
- Opened: 1968
- Closed: 1993
- Rebuilt: 10 May 2025
Location

Aghdam Railway and Bus Station Complex (Azerbaijani: Ağdam Dəmir Yolu və Avtovağzal Kompleksi) is a railway station and bus terminal complex in Aghdam, Azerbaijan. It serves the rebuilt Barda–Aghdam railway line, part of Azerbaijan's post-war transport reconstruction in the region. The Barda–Aghdam railway line is reported to be 47.3 km long.

== History ==
Work on a narrow-gauge railway route planned to connect Yevlakh–Barda–Aghdam–Khankendi–Shusha began in 1908, but the project was not completed due to World War I.

The Yevlakh–Barda–Aghdam railway was commissioned in 1967, and Aghdam station is described as having opened in 1968. In 1978–1979, the railway line was extended to Stepanakert (now Khankendi).

During the Nagorno-Karabakh conflict, Aghdam was occupied in 1993 and rail operations on the Barda–Aghdam line ceased.

Following the 2020 ceasefire agreement, Azerbaijan restored control over the Aghdam District on 20 November 2020. After that, Azerbaijan announced design and construction works to rebuild the Barda–Aghdam railway line.

== Reconstruction and reopening ==
On 26 April 2025, local media reported a test run on the Barda–Aghdam line using a newly delivered Stadler FLIRT passenger trainset.

On 10 May 2025, President Ilham Aliyev attended the opening of the rebuilt Barda–Aghdam railway line and the Aghdam Railway and Bus Station Complex.

On 23 May 2025, Hikmet Hajiyev and members of Azerbaijan's coordination headquarters for reconstruction of the territories reportedly travelled by train from Aghdam to Baku.

== See also ==
- Transport in Azerbaijan
- Aghdam
- Baku railway station
- Sumgait railway station
