= Sumgait railway station =

Railway station in Azerbaijan

Sumgait railway stantion

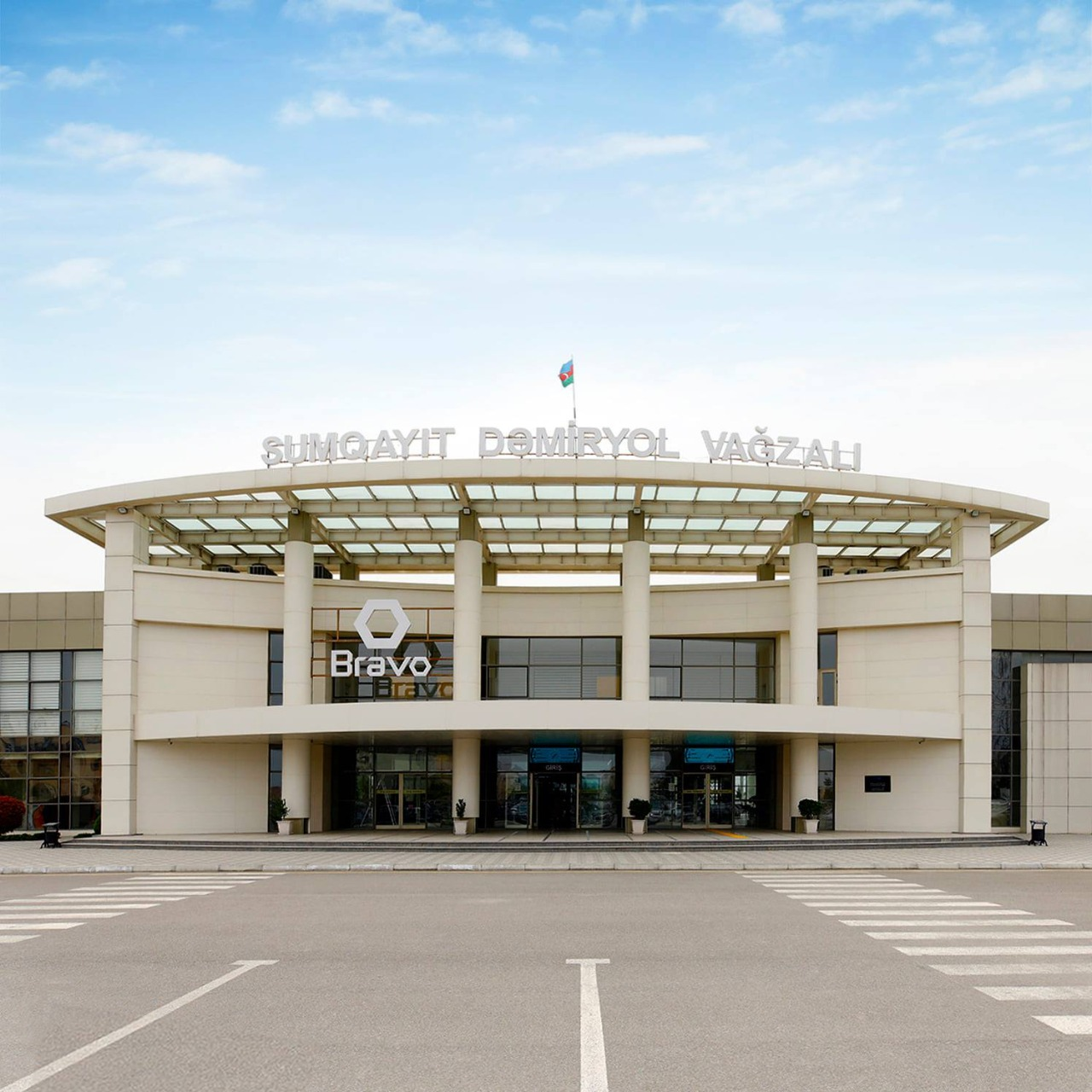
- Sumgait railway station

General information
- Location: Sumgait, Azerbaijan
- Coordinates: 40°33′44.2″N 49°40′52.5″E
- System: Regional rail
- Owner: Azerbaijan Railways

- Operator: Azerbaijan Railways
- Line: Baku suburban railway
- Tracks: 7
- Connections: 5, 6, 10A, 22, 39; Future Tram

Construction
- Structure type: At-grade
- Parking: Yes

Other information
- Station code: 546441

History
- Opened: 1958
- Rebuilt: 2018
Location
- Location within Azerbaijan

Sumqayıt Railway Station (Azerbaijani: Sumqayıt Dəmir Yolu Vağzalı) is a railway station in Sumgait, Azerbaijan, serving as a key transport hub for passenger and freight services. Modernized in 2023, it supports the city's industrial and regional connectivity needs.

== History ==
Sumgait Railway Station opened in 1958 to serve the industrial city of Sumgait, Azerbaijan, becoming a key transportation hub for passenger and freight services. In 2018, a major reconstruction project began under a presidential decree to modernize the station. Completed in 2023, the project transformed the station into a three-story complex spanning 5,500 square meters. The modernization included new facilities such as waiting halls, ticket offices, a police station, and underground pedestrian crossings. Advanced safety systems, including fire suppression and ventilation, were installed, and railway tracks and signaling systems were upgraded. The project reflects Azerbaijan's broader efforts to enhance railway infrastructure and improve regional connectivity.

== Infrastructure ==
The Sumgait Railway Station complex features modern amenities designed to enhance passenger comfort and operational efficiency. The station includes a waiting hall, ticket offices, a police station, a server room, and luggage storage facilities on the first floor. The second floor houses offices, rest rooms for train drivers, and a kitchen. The basement includes a parking area for vehicles. The station is equipped with modern security cameras, fire suppression systems, and ventilation systems. Additional infrastructure includes a turnstile building, a two-story relay and signaling building, high and low platforms, an electrical substation, a water pump station, and a boiler room. The station's surroundings have been landscaped, and modern lighting systems have been installed. A 43-meter-long underground pedestrian passage connects the platforms, ensuring safe and convenient access for passengers.

== Gallery ==
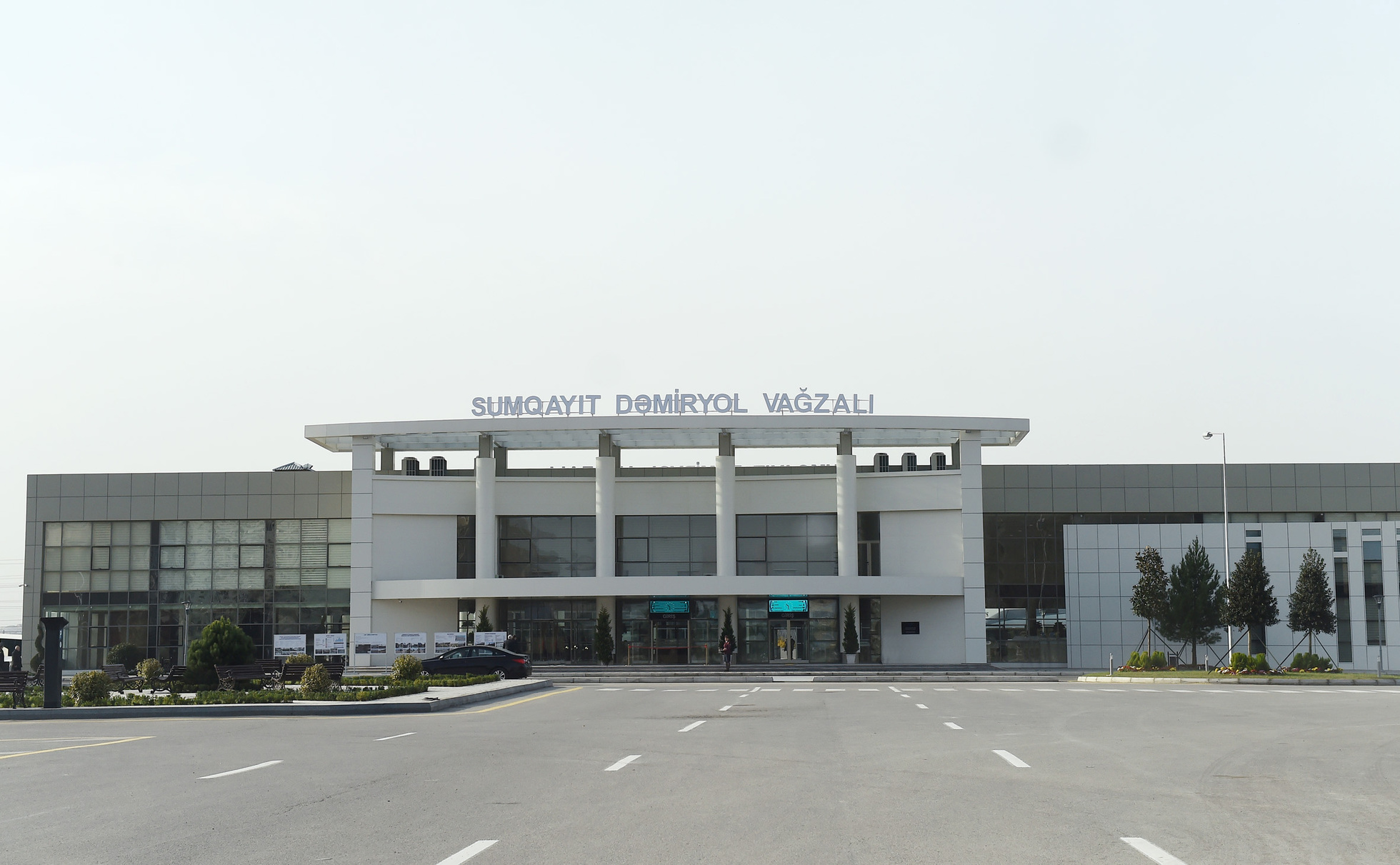

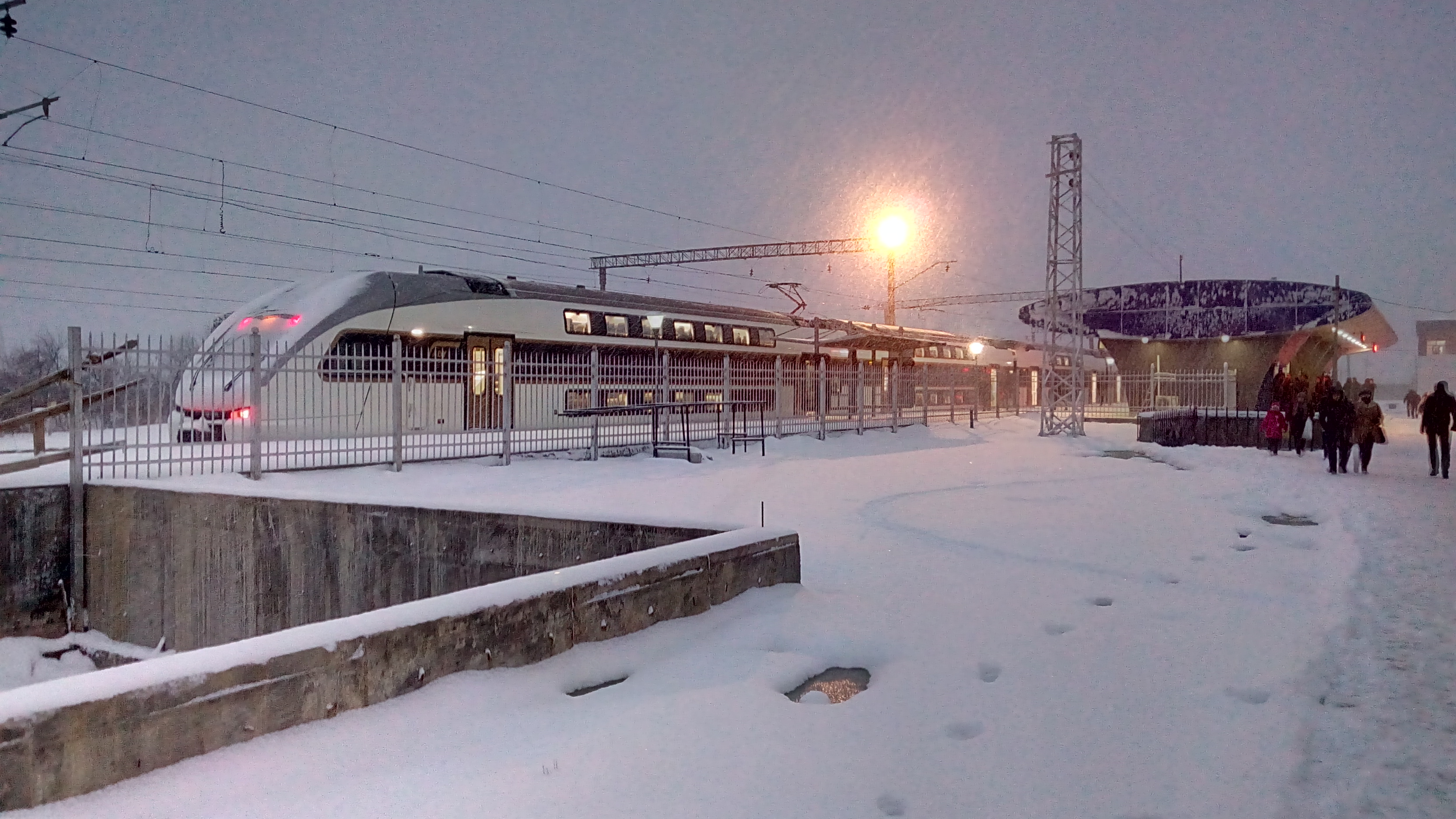

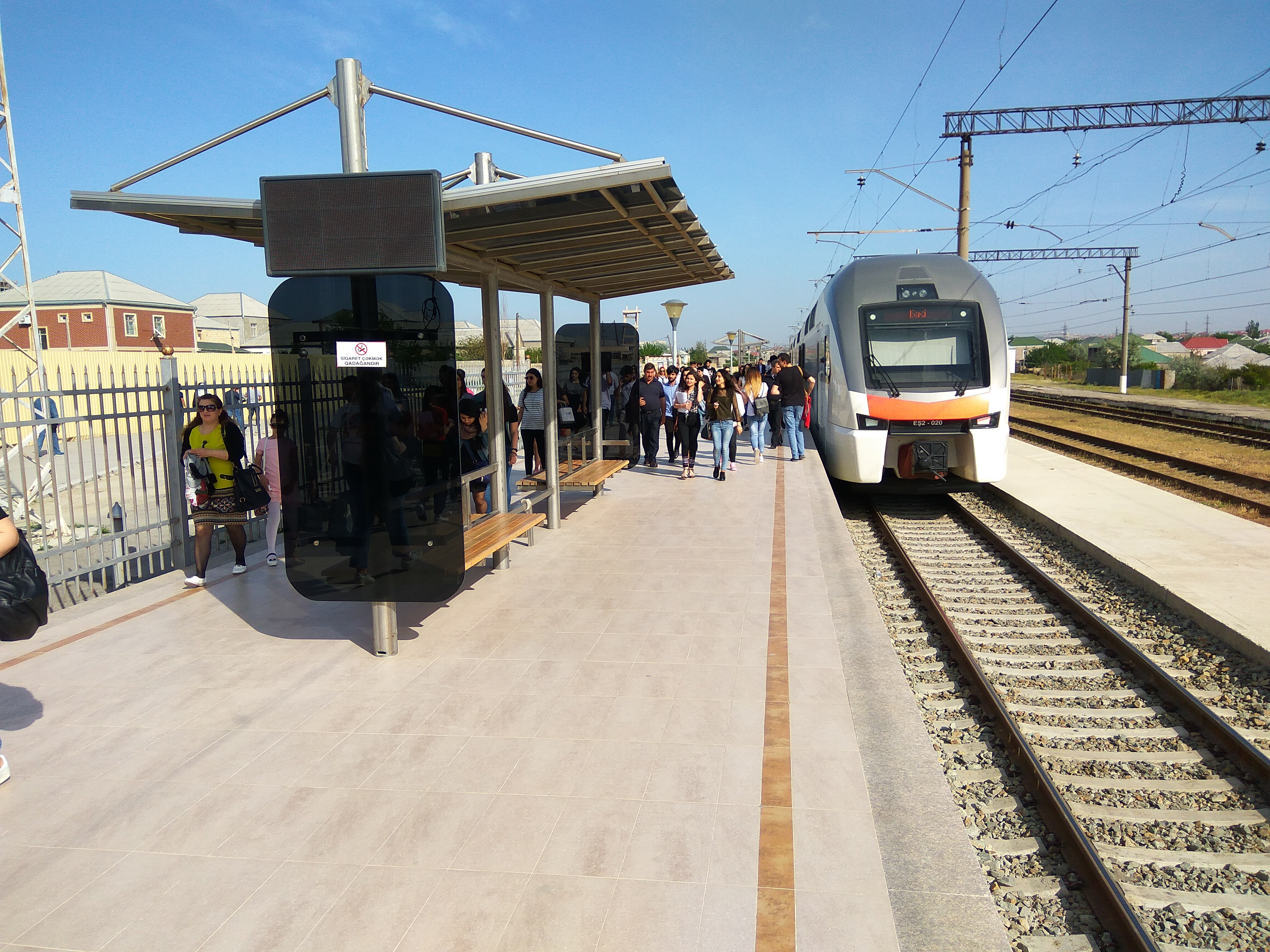

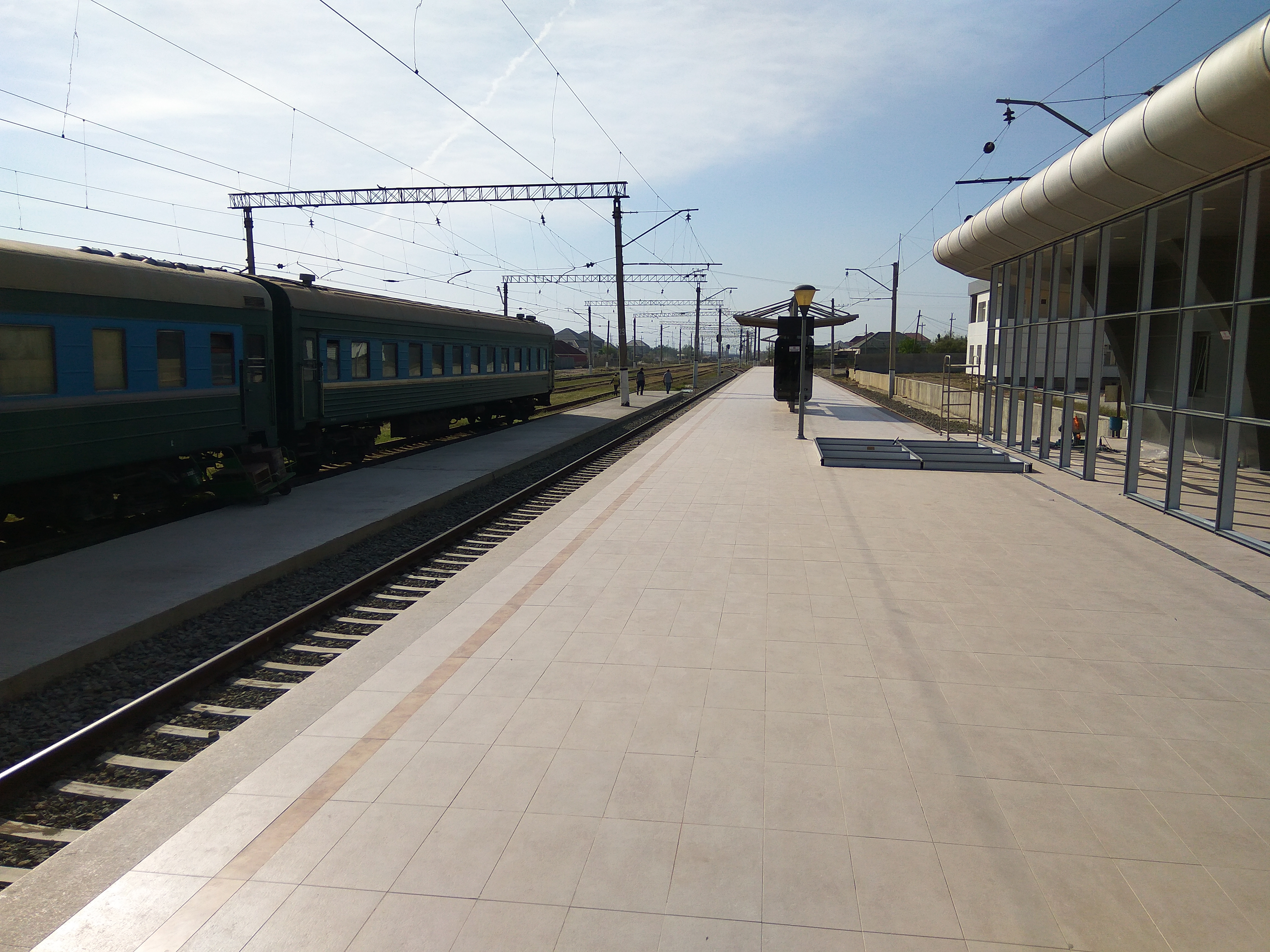

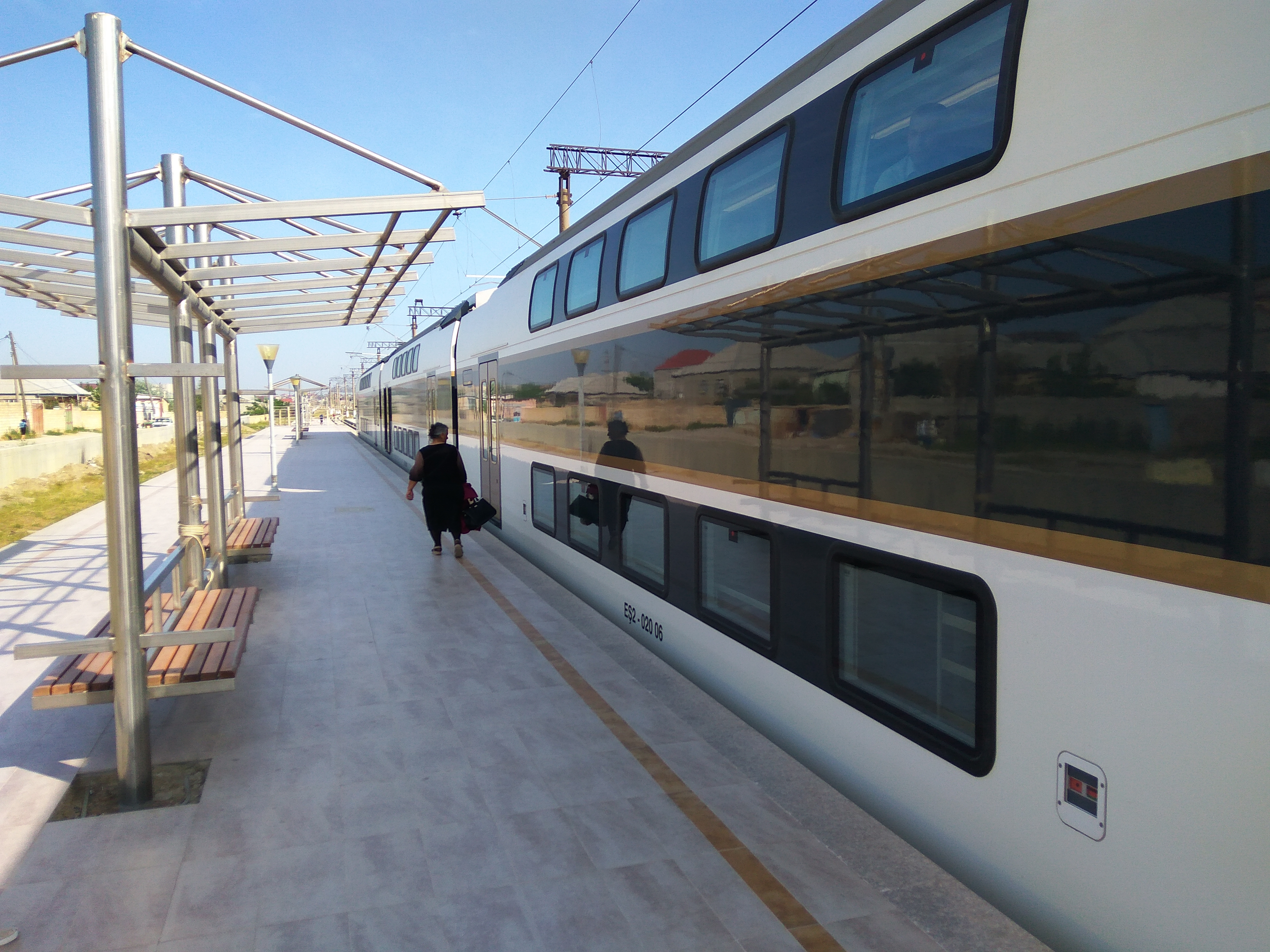

== See also ==
- Baku railway station
- Aghdam Railway and Bus Station Complex
