= Baku International Bus Terminal =

Bus station in Baku, Azerbaijan

Coordinates: 40.4281°N 49.7975°E

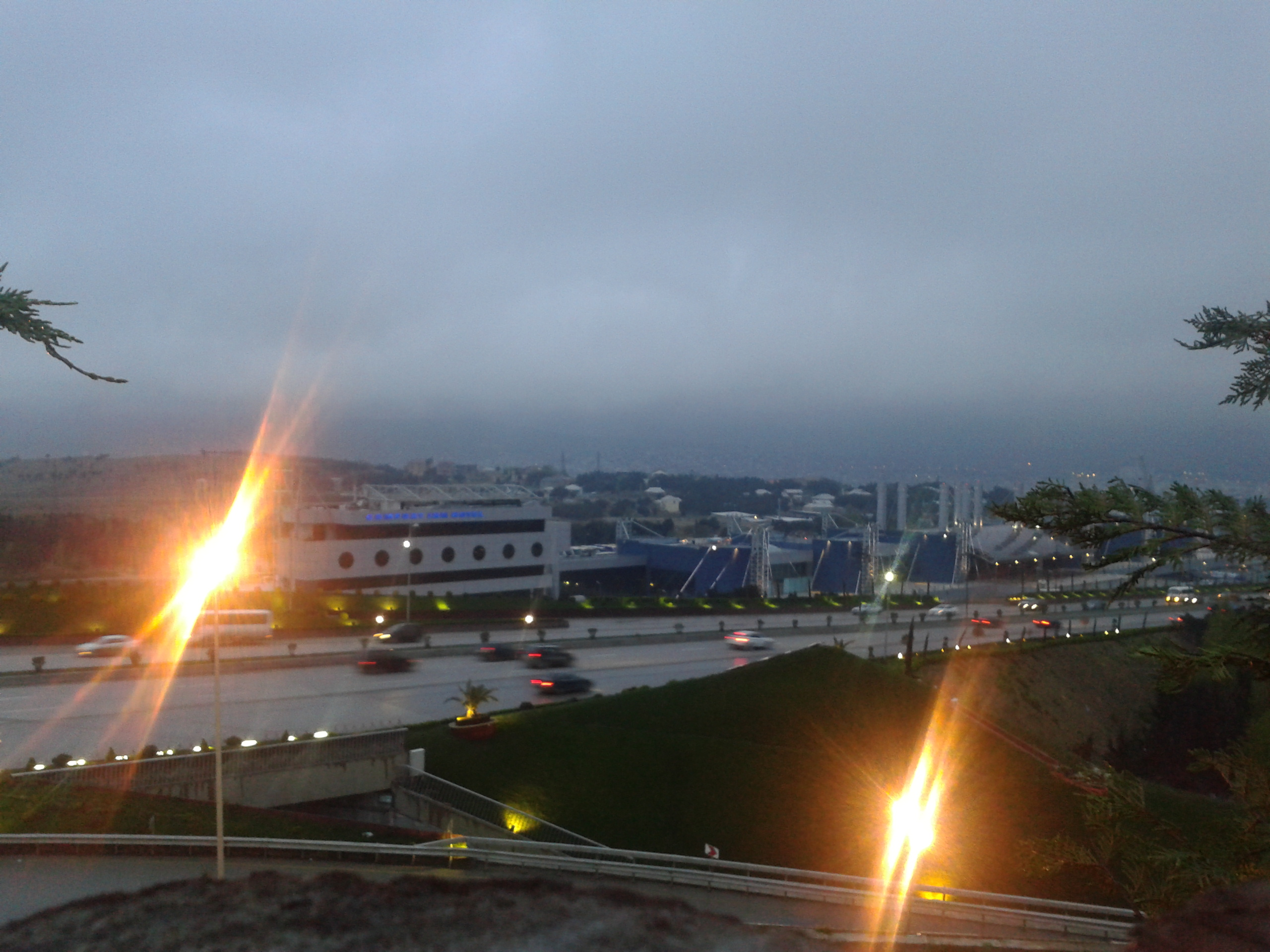
Baku International Bus Terminal

Baku International Bus Terminal is a bus terminal located in Baku, Azerbaijan. The foundation stone for the complex was laid in 2004, and construction work was carried out by local firm "Baku 21st century". Baku International Bus Terminal was opened officially on 12 February 2009. It is the biggest bus terminal in the Commonwealth of Independent States countries. Its design resembles a ship. It is located on Sumgait highway, in the entry to Baku city.

== About the complex ==
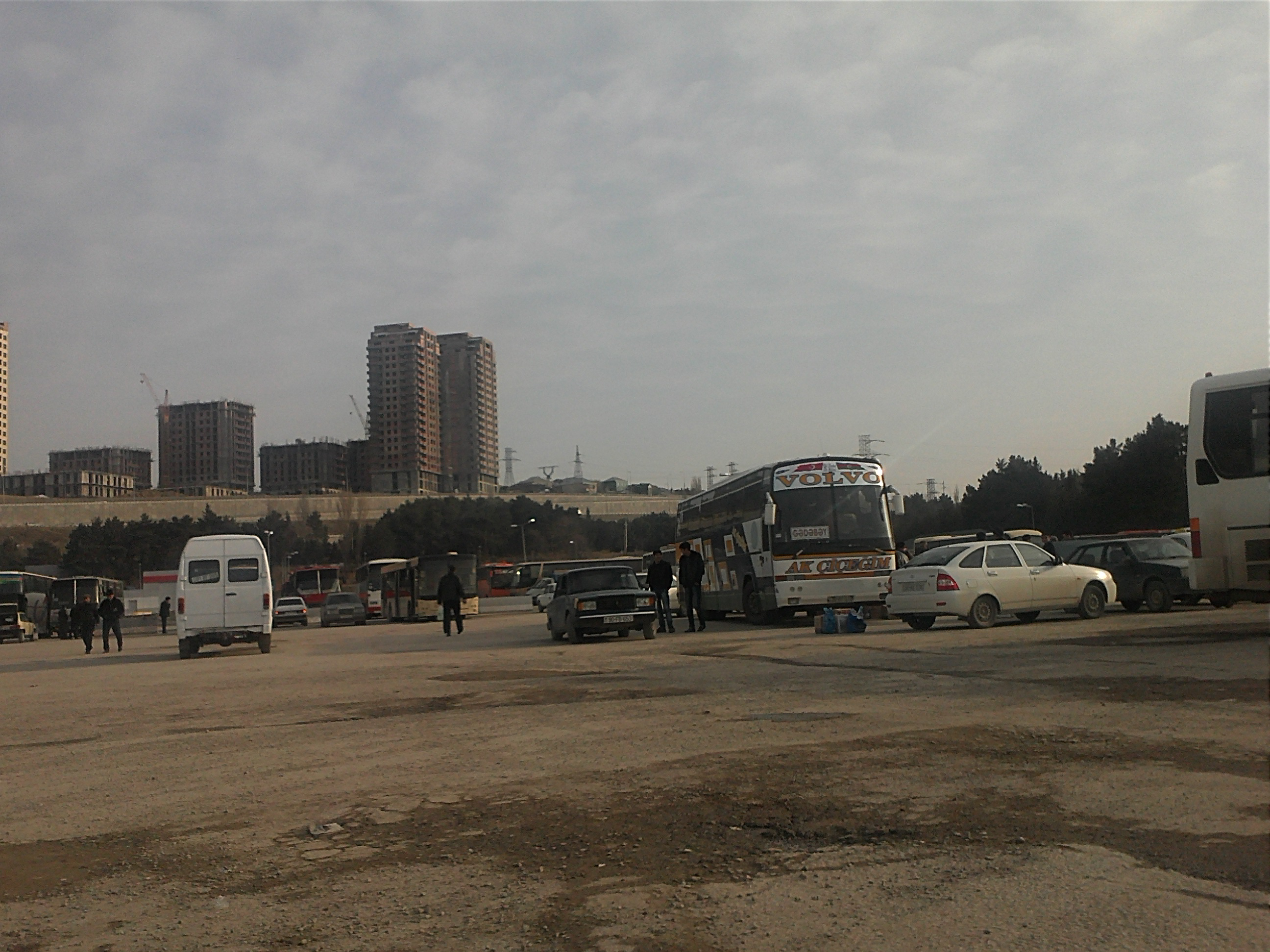
Baku international bus station

The complex handles up to 950 bus movements every day across domestic and international routes, serving around 20,000 passengers. The terminal has four floors served by 14 escalators and 10 lifts. It also features a 93-bed hotel, 700-space car park, shopping mall of 800 shops, 500-seat canteen, bank, medical center, post office, and waiting and VIP rooms. There is also a station supervisor's office and bus drivers` restroom facilities. The complex also has its own 35 kV auxiliary power station and five transformers.

== Construction ==
Materials used during the construction as well as equipment installed here were delivered from Italy, Japan, Korea, Switzerland, France, Ukraine, Turkey, Iran, China, Russia, the United Arab Emirates, and India.

== Subway station ==
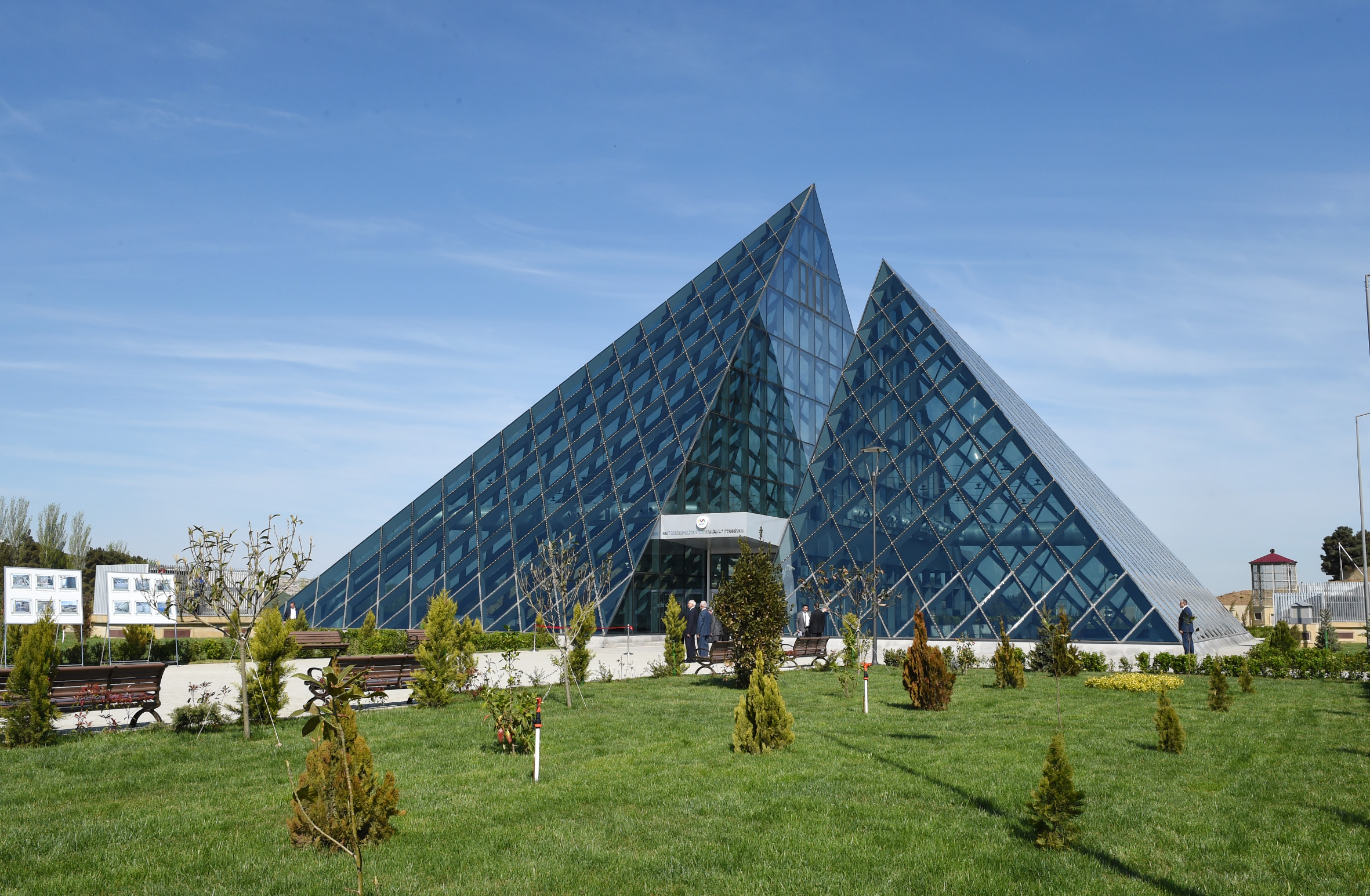
Avtovagzal Metro Station (Connected to International Bus Terminal)

Avtovağzal subway station opened on April 19, 2016.

== Design ==
The architect is Kamal Musakhanov, ARCON company.
