= Baku Transport Agency =

By decree of the President of the Republic of Azerbaijan of December 21, 2015, the Baku Transport Agency was established under the Cabinet of Ministers of the Republic of Azerbaijan.

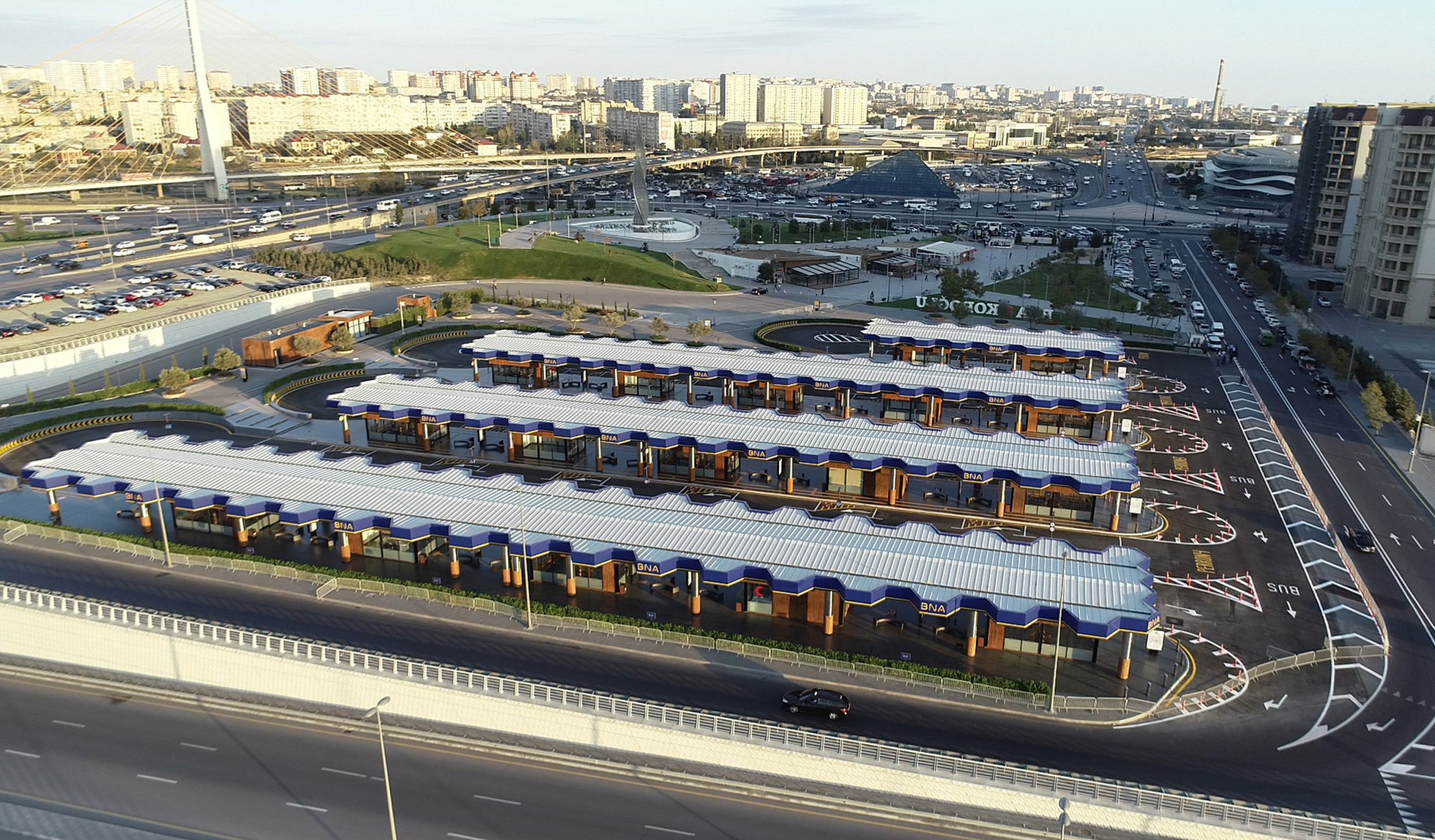
Koroglu Transport Exchange Center of Baku Transport Agency

== Fields of activity ==
Organization of control and management of regular passenger transportation by road and cars of taxi services.

Organization of centralized management of the traffic flow and ensuring the regulation of the traffic flow with the structures involved in transport control.

Ensuring the development of the transport sector.

Providing state control in the transport sector.

== Tickets ==
Payment in public transport is carried out by cards "BakıKART".

=== Plastic cards «BakıKART» ===
The balance of cards can be replenished at the Baku Metro stations, bus stops, payment machines '' MilliÖN ''.

=== "BakıKART for limited use" ===
At purchase, it is possible to load 1, 2, 3 and 4 journeys, it is impossible to replenish balance on terminals.

== “Aero Express” buses ==
Buses are designed to carry 48 passengers. The buses have a kitchenette, a luggage compartment, and access to the Internet.

Buses run from the metro station "28 May", making only one stop at the metro station "Koroglu", and then go to the airport, as well as in the opposite direction at intervals of 30 minutes.

== Centers of transport interchange ==
"Koroglu"," 28 May ", "Lokbatan" and "Darnagul".

== Training Center for Drivers ==
For those wishing to occupy vacant drivers' places, the "Training Center for Drivers" conducts theoretical and practical work on the professional activity and behavior of drivers, also on the specifics of additional work and rest. Candidates who have completed the courses are provided with work in the relevant carrier companies. To participate in the training, the following documents are required.

When training drivers, the training center - Test & Training Azerbaijan - uses simulators. With the help of these simulators, the knowledge of drivers and candidates for drivers is checked and evaluated, in case of errors, under the supervision of a specialist, the driving skills are improved. After completing the test, the simulator issues a general assessment of driving based on which the driver is allowed to work or not.

== Carrier companies ==
"BakuBus" MMC

"Xaliq Faiqoğlu" MMC

"Çinar-Trans" MMC
